= Immacolata Concezione, Bordighera =

Chiesa dell’Immacolata Concezione
- Chiesa dell’Immacolata Concezione o Chiesa di Terrasanta
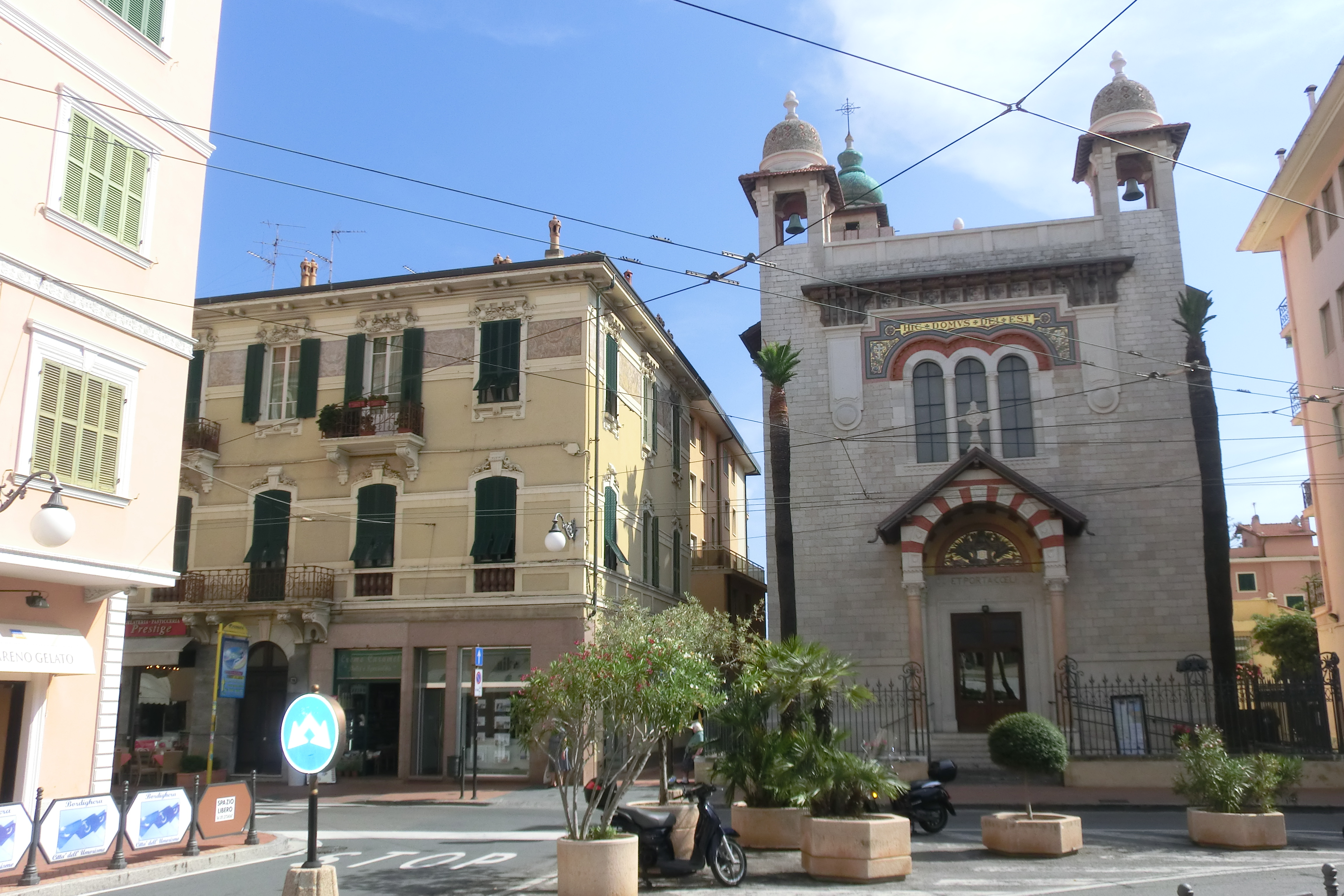
- Church of Immaculate Conception
- Chiesa dell’Immacolata Concezione
- 43°46′42″N 7°39′59″E
- Location: Bordighera
- Country: Italy
- Website: Sito della parrocchia

History
- Consecrated: 1886

Architecture
- Architect: Charles Garnier (architect)

Administration
- Province: Province of Imperia
- Diocese: Ventimiglia-Sanremo

Clergy
- Bishop: Antonio Suetta
- Dean: Bordighera

The church of the Immaculate Conception, officiated by the Frati Minori Francescani, is at via Vittorio Emanuele 75, in Bordighera, Province of Imperia. The church is also called the Church of the Terrasanta (Holy Land), in honour to the first missionary priests who officiated Mass returning from Palestine. The church is part of the properties protected by the Superintendent of Ministry of Cultural Heritage and Activities and Tourism (Italy).

== History and description ==
Father Giacomo Viale, who was the parish priest of Bordighera, was a Franciscan priest. One of his wishes was to build a church in the new area of the city that had developed along the coast. At first he turned to the architect Alexander Cantu of Sanremo, but the project was stopped when the priest returned to the convent. In 1875, he came back to Bordighera, enlisted the help of the architect Charles Garnier for the realization of his ambitious project. The land to build the church was donated by Mr. Francesco Moreno, well known for his beautiful gardens, the Moreno Gardens.

The first draft plan of Garnier is dated 30 June 1882. Garnier liked to say that:

Bordighera is more Palestine than Italy ... Is there something more distinctive, more Eastern, more "One Thousand and One Nights"?

It is probably because of this conviction that he decided to design a church typical of the mendicant orders of the Palestine (region). Then he designed a single nave, divided into three pillars that carry bows with large side windows. The facade which included a mosaic decoration was enriched with additional mosaics and the quotation Hic Domus Dei Oriente. The façade is also framed by two lateral towers, a porch that rests on a base of Turbie stone. Behind the church one can admire the bell tower that is inspired by the towers which Garnier used in the villa built on the coast for his clients.

On 14 January 1883, the bishop, Monsignor Tommaso Reggio, inaugurated the project by blessing the foundation stone and works could begin. Father Giacomo Viale asked if the Mission of the Holy Land wished to send its missionaries returning from Palestine back to Bordighera first, to allow them an easier return. In 1885 the first missionaries, with health problems, began to arrive in the city and settled in the church, returning the hospitality by officiating Mass.

On 14 February 1886, the bishop consecrated the church and dedicated it to the Immaculate Conception, but the church was not yet complete. The son of Charles Garnier, Christian, decided, when his father died, to finance personally and with the help of his mother, the end of the works. The bell tower was completed in 1899 and the interior decorations in 1902. They are by Marcel Jambon and by the Parisian Poinsot who painted the inside of the dome above the altar.

Inside the church is also a painting depicting The Deposition by the Belgian painter Jules Pierre van Biesbroeck of Ghent and a painting by Giuseppe Balbo The death of Saint Joseph .

Unfortunately in 1906 and in 1963, some additional works modified the initial design altering its consistency. The church is part of the properties protected by the Superintendent of Ministry of Cultural Heritage and Activities and Tourism (Italy).

== Photo gallery ==
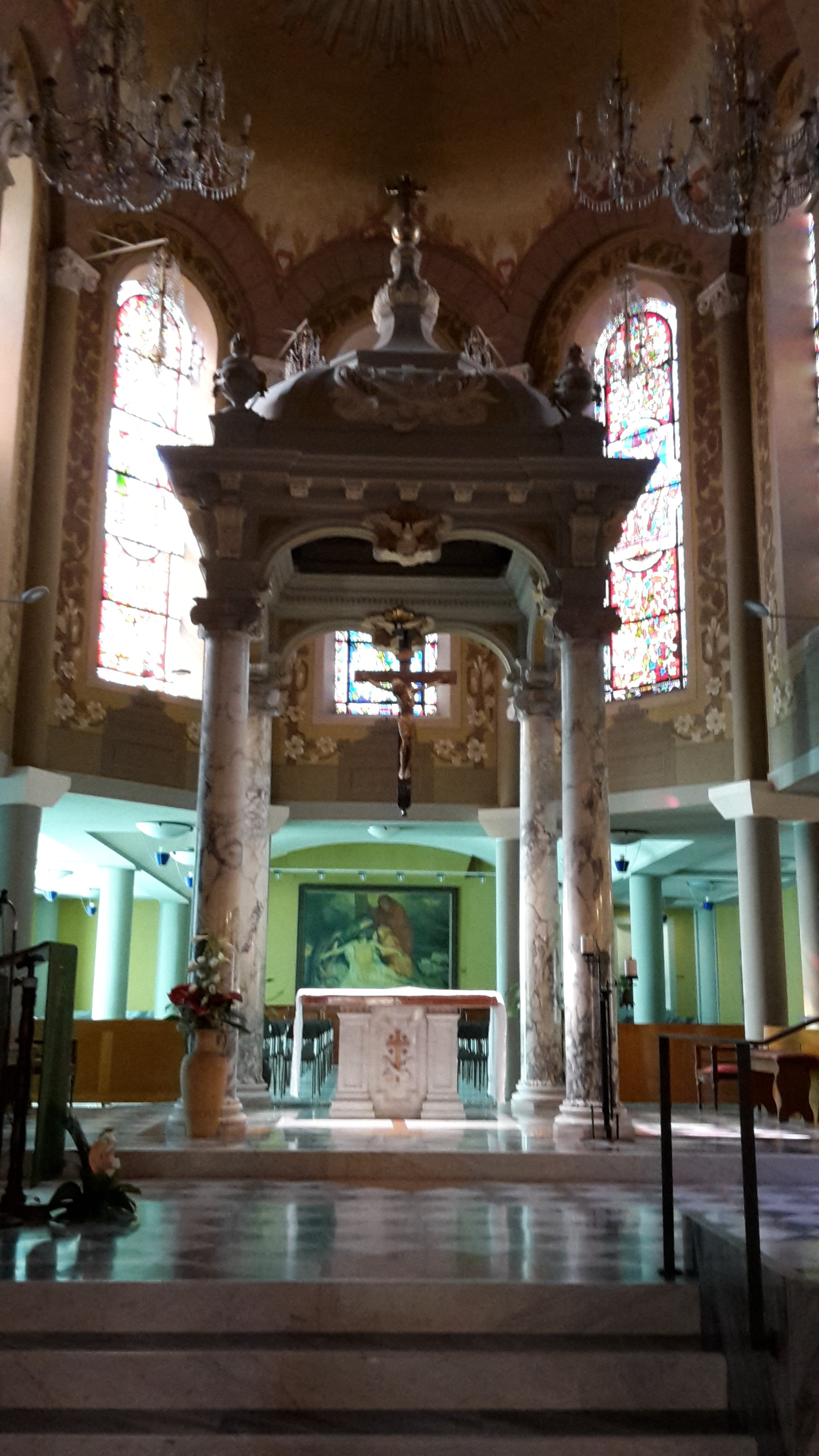
Church of the Immaculate Conception in Bordighera, the altar

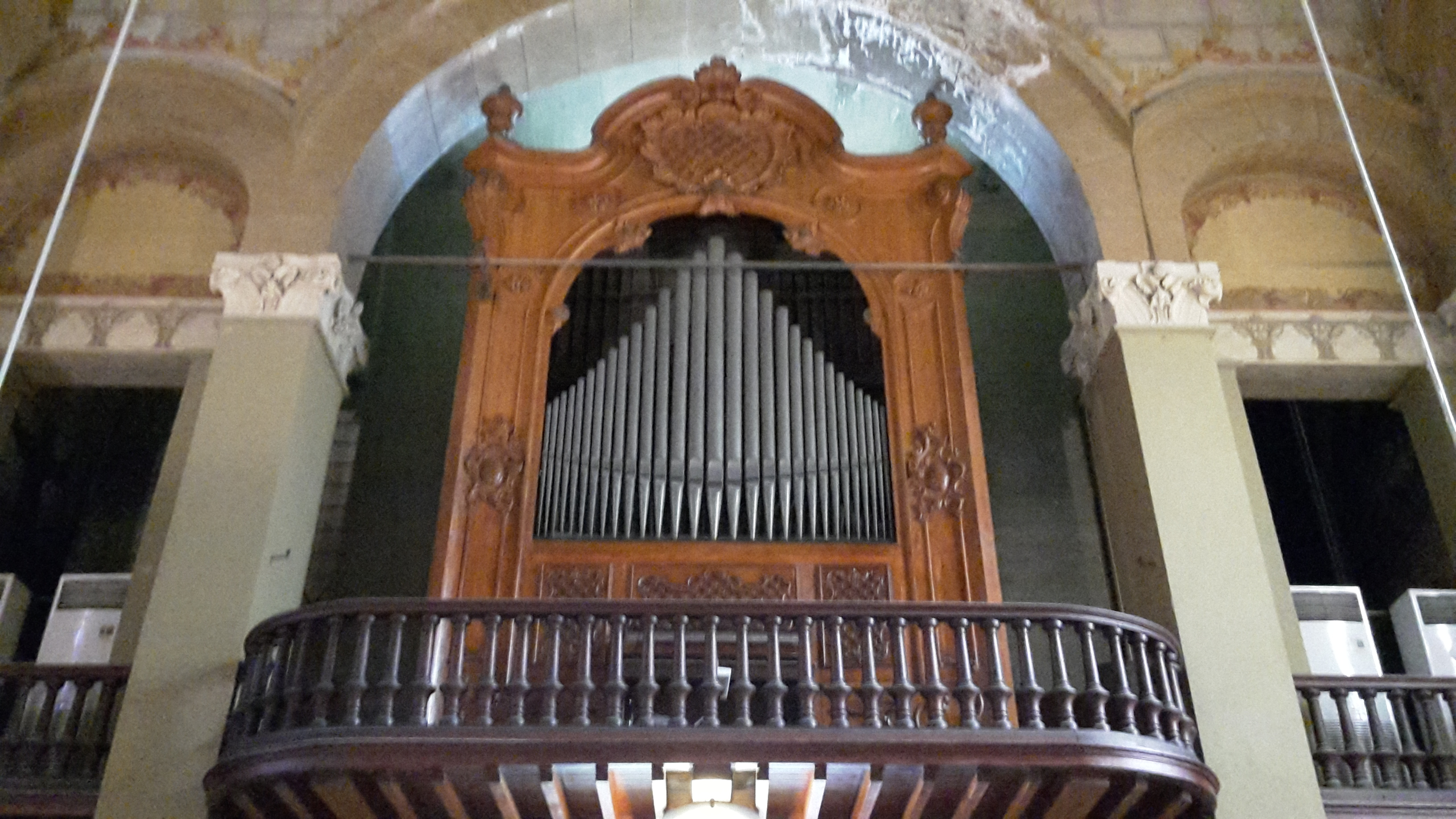
Church of the Immaculate Conception, the organ

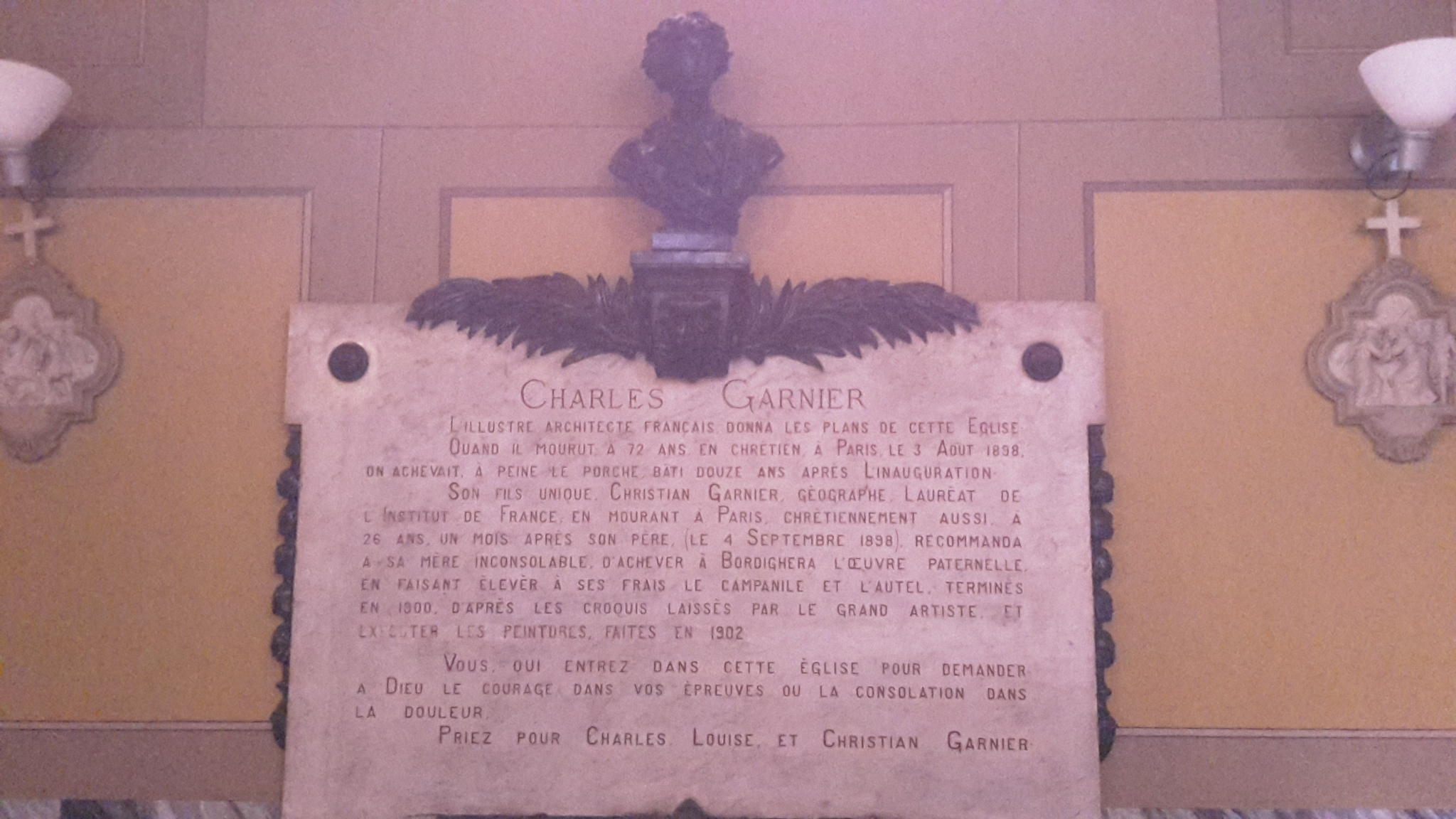
Church of the Immaculate Conception, plaque in honour of Charles Garnier

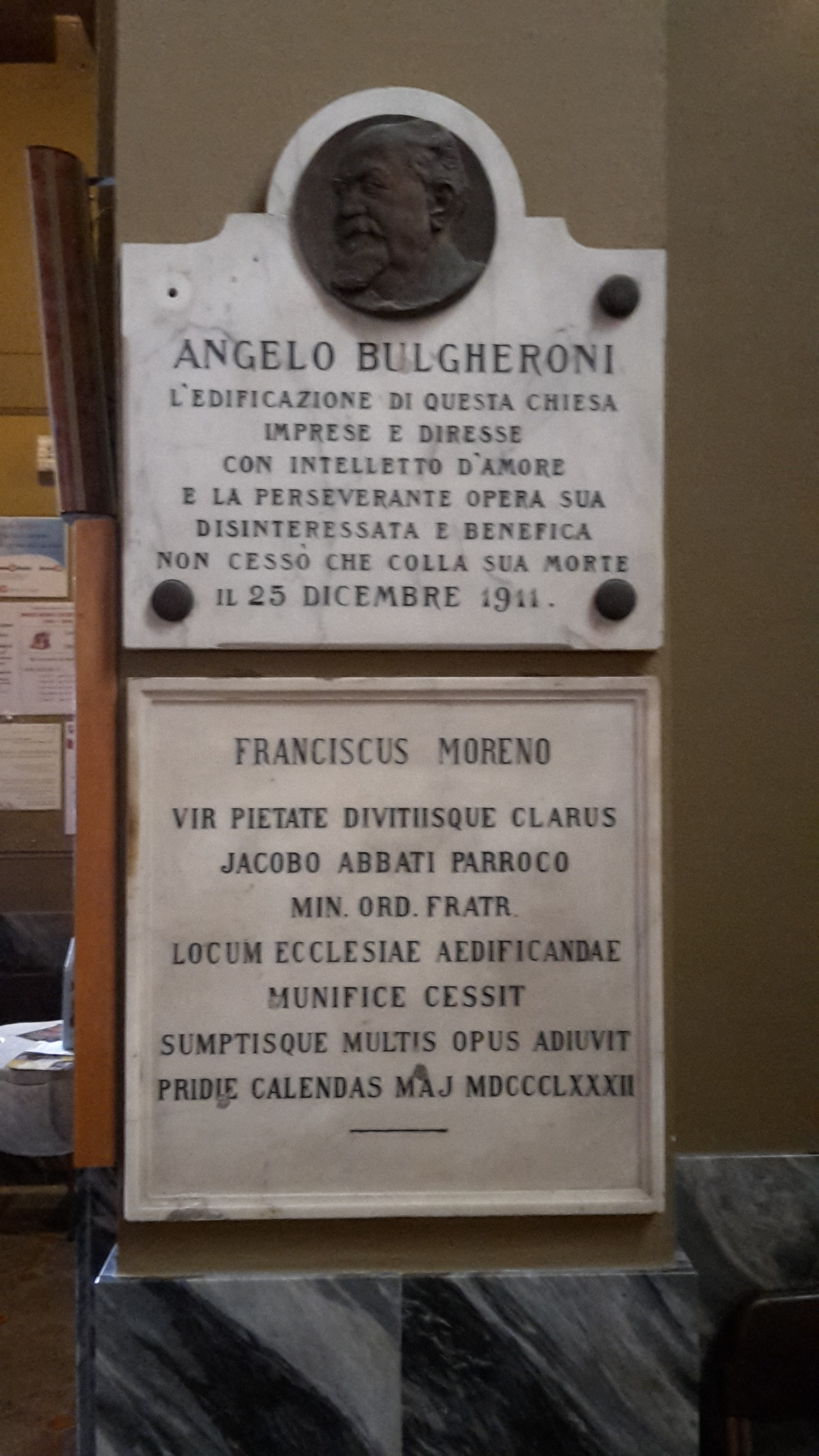
Church of the Immaculate Conception, plaque in honour of Francesco Moreno

== See also ==
- Bordighera
