= Christian Garnier =

French geographer (1872–1898)

- Born: 24 July 1872; Paris, France
- Died: 4 September 1898 (aged 26); Paris, France
- Other name: Nino
- Education: École de Génie Civil de Paris
- Occupations: Geographer, linguist
- Notable work: Méthode de Transcription rationnelle générale des Noms géographiques (TRG)
- Awards: Prix Volney (1898)

Christian Garnier (1872–1898) was a French geographer and linguist best known for developing a systematic transcription method for geographical names. At the age of 14, he became the youngest member of the Société de Géographie in Paris. He went on to write several books dealing with select topics of linguistic and geographical interest. Garnier died in 1898 at the age of 26 and was posthumously awarded the Prix Volney. In 1925, the Société de Géographie created the Christian Garnier Prize for contributions to the study of geography.

== Biography ==
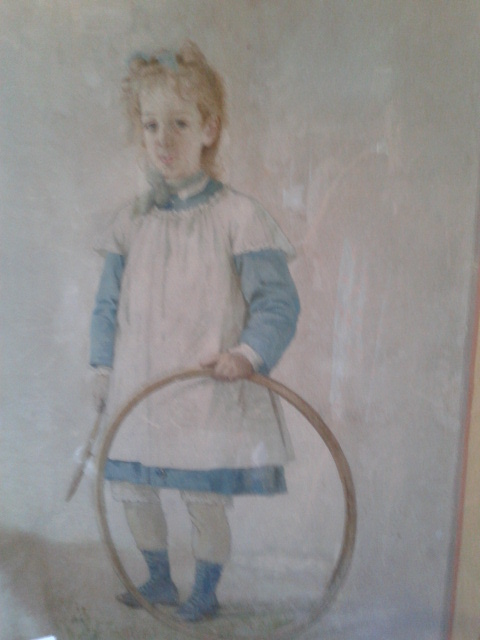
Ritratto di Christian Garnier enfant à Villa Garnier, Bordighera

Christian Garnier was born in Paris, France, on 24 July 1872, the second son of Charles Garnier and Louise Bary. Christian, nicknamed Nino, was doted upon by his parents. The couple, who married in 1858, had lost their first son Daniel (born 21 March 1862), eight years before, at the age of two years. The young Christian had a frail constitution, and a close watch was always kept on him by both parents.

Garnier soon proved to have a lively mind. He was admitted to the prestigious Lycée Louis-le-Grand, where his teacher was Stéphane Auguste-Ammann (1844–1921). He was passionate about languages and geography, becoming at age 14 the youngest member of the Paris Société de Géographie. At 21 he enrolled at the School of Civil Engineering (École de Génie Civil de Paris), but his projects and his health were severely undermined by a bout of tuberculosis he suffered in the following year, 1894. On account of Christian's poor health, the Garnier family decided to spend almost all that year in Bordighera, where they owned a villa, Villa Garnier, built by Christian's father in 1871.

Christian Garnier showed remarkable perseverance and in 1895, despite his disease, published a book, Traité de Géographie Générale. In 1899, his Méthode de Transcription rationnelle générale des Noms géographiques ("Method for a general rational Transcription of geographical Names") was published by Ernest Leroux. Probably Garnier's most notable work, its system of geographical nomenclature is still in use today.

In 1897, he published "Charter of the language distribution in the western Alps", which focused on the similarities of spoken dialects straddling different political boundaries. In the same year, he wrote "Catalogus plantarum", in which he catalogued the botanical varieties growing in the park at Villa Garnier, and also a very targeted geographic study "Monograph of the Province of Porto Maurizio". His final publication, which appeared a few months before his death, was "The grammar and vocabulary of idioms of Realdo and Bordighera".

In addition to writing, Garnier continued participating in numerous scientific conferences throughout Europe. In 1898 he entered the Prix Volney, which was awarded to him posthumously, unanimously, for his main work Méthode de Transcription rationnelle générale des Noms géographiques.

He died at the age of 26, on 4 September 1898, a month after his father. He is buried in the Montparnasse Cemetery next to his father.

== Honours ==
In 1898 he received, exceptionally, the Prix Volney posthumously. The motivation of the committee: "This year, alongside a book on Slavic grammar, the commission crowns the work of a young scientist, who unfortunately died before receiving his prize, for a transcription system for geographical names: Christian Garnier."

In 1925 the Société de géographie created the Christian Garnier Prize. This is a prize awarded to authors who have contributed to the development of geographical study.

== Bibliography ==
- Dossier sur Bordighera (1889)
- Essai de géographie générale suivi de tables se rapportant à la géographie (1895)
- Charte de la distribution des langues dans les Alpes occidentales (1897)
- Catalogus plantarum vivacium annuarumque quae in plena terra cultae reperiuntur in horto Villae Caroli Garnier (1897)
- Monographie de la province de Porto Maurizio (1897)
- Méthode de transcription rationnelle générale des noms géographique, published in Paris by Leroux in 1898
- Lettres sur participation au III Congrès italien de géographies, Bordighera (19 April 1898)
- Deux patois des Alpes-Maritimes italiennes : grammaires et vocabulaires méthodiques des idiomes de Bordighera et de Realdo (1898)
