= Bordighera Town Hall =

Coordinates: 43.77933°N 7.67237°E

- Municipio di Bordighera (Italian)
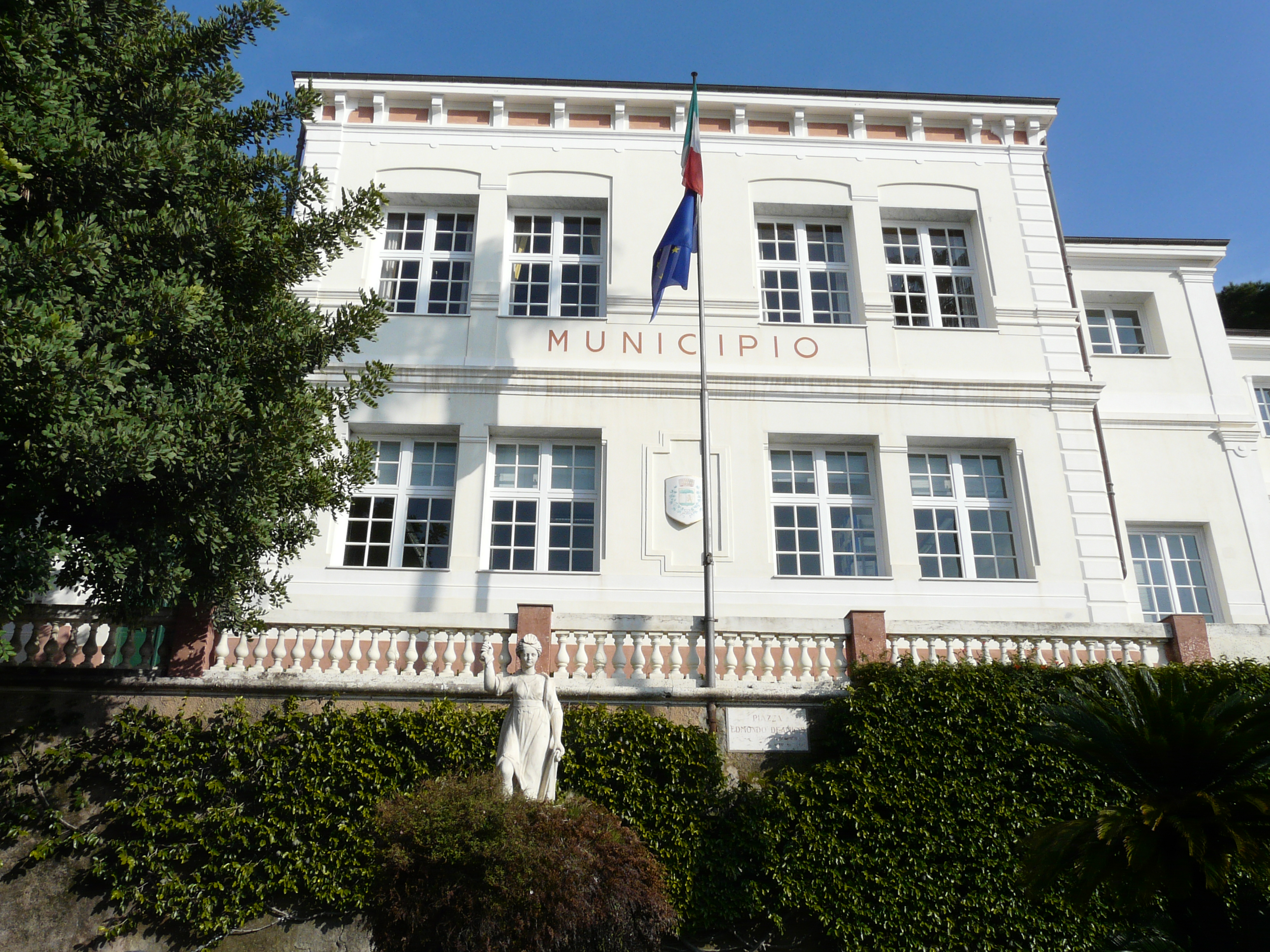
- The Town hall of Bordighera
- Interactive map of the Bordighera Town Hall area

General information
- Location: Bordighera, Italy
- Construction started: ca. 1872
- Completed: ca. 1878
- Client: Bordighera municipality

Design and construction
- Architect: Charles Garnier
- Designations: Soprintendenze per i Beni Architettonici e Paesaggistici della Liguria

The Bordighera Town Hall (Italian: Municipio di Bordighera) is located at 32 Via XX Settembre in Bordighera, Liguria.

== History ==
The current town hall was built to a design by the French architect Charles Garnier. Garnier, who had left Paris because of Paris Commune (1871), was looking for a land in Bordighera to build his future house. In 1871 he proposed the municipality to buy the land where only school of the city stayed. The offer of 6,000 pounds was very generous, it would have allowed the construction of a new school for which Garnier provided the plans.

The project included a classical building that integrates well with the old town of Bordighera that lies behind. The new schools foresaw not only a new section for boys replacing the previous one, but also a girls' section and one for small children. The project is to be considered truly innovative for its time and the municipality accepted the proposal. During the works, which were not followed by Garnier, there were numerous technical problems and delays in deliveries. It was only in 1878 that part of the building was finally terminated.

Meanwhile, the population grew and the city decided to build a new school that was opened later in 1886. With the transfer of the school, the municipality decided to use the building as its headquarters. The facade was carved with the coat of arms of the city, a rampant lion that leans against a Pine seafarer. Inside the town hall you can admire numerous paintings from various artists who stayed in Bordighera, including: Pompeo Mariani, Giuseppe Ferdinando Piana, Giuseppe Balbo, Friederich von Kleudgen, etc.

== The gardens ==
The true gardens of the town hall are between the building designed by Charles Garnier and the Cape Esplanade. These gardens, although of small size, can boast two great Ficus macrophylla centenarians and many varieties of exotic plants (agaves, palm trees, cactus, etc.) which can also be seen in many Bordighera gardens. On 17 January 1954, the city placed a bust in honour of Ludwig Winter, its illustrious adopted citizen, as an honour to the man who had done so much to bring prestige to the city and to the Riviera. This is sometimes confusing. Some mistakenly call these gardens also "Winter Gardens", but the real Winter Gardens are at 6 Ludovico Winter Street in Bordighera.

At the foot of the old town hall of Bordighera, there is a large wooden area that is called in various ways: the gardens of the Cape or, more commonly, Cape Pineta. The gardens are vast, and full of very old trees such as pines, olive trees, palm trees and a variety of other species, but very old specimens of Araucaria heterophylla stand out. In the pine forest there is also a bust in honour of the painter Mosè Bianchi, who often came to Bordighera to spend time with his grandson Pompeo Mariani. Also in the Cape Pineta, but a bit lower, there is a monument in honour of Charles Garnier.

On May 15, 2015, the renovation of the Marabutto was terminated. It is an ancient powder keg that is currently in the Cape Pineta. The name is due to the shape of the small building that recalls the graves of Muslim holy men (a cube topped by a dome), whose name is precisely marabutto. Near the Marabutto, you can see three old cannons so much loved by the locals that they were given names: Butafoegu, Tiralogni et Cacastrasse.

== Trivia ==
When the city had to choose its coat of arms, a dispute broke out with the neighbouring city of Sanremo. Bordighera, which was nicknamed "Queen of the Palms", wanted to see represented the palm on his coat of arms, but the bigger rival city had already a similar one, so Bordighera had to settle for a pine.

Behind the municipal building is one of four Ficus Magnolioides recognised by the State Forestry. The monumental tree has an estimated age of 100 years, with a height of 18 meters and a diameter of the stem of 1040 cm.

== Photo gallery ==
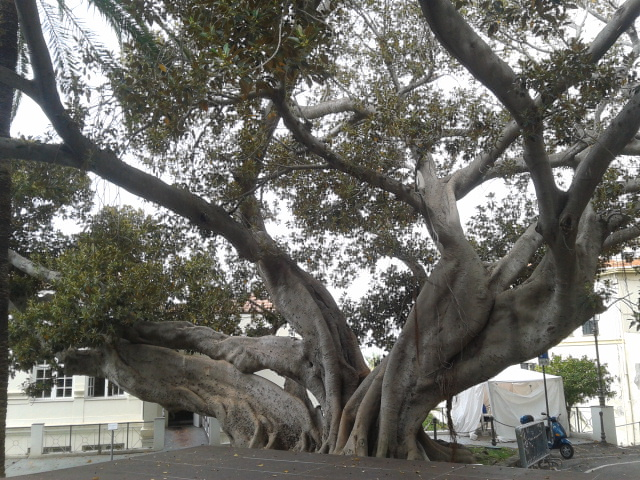
Ficus macrophylla, behind town hall of Bordighera.

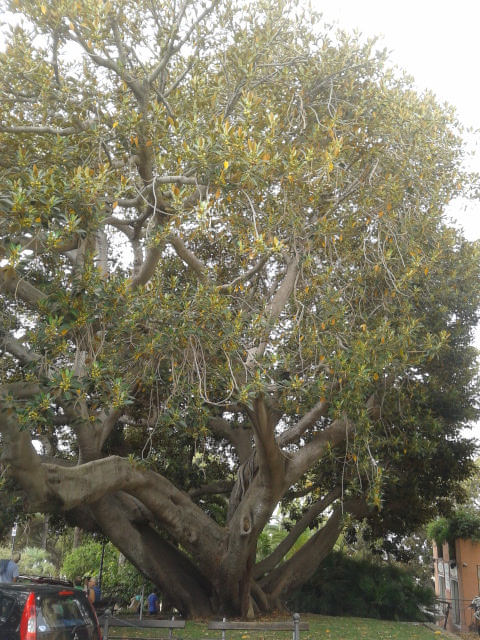
Ficus macrophylla near the Spianata del Capo at Bordighera

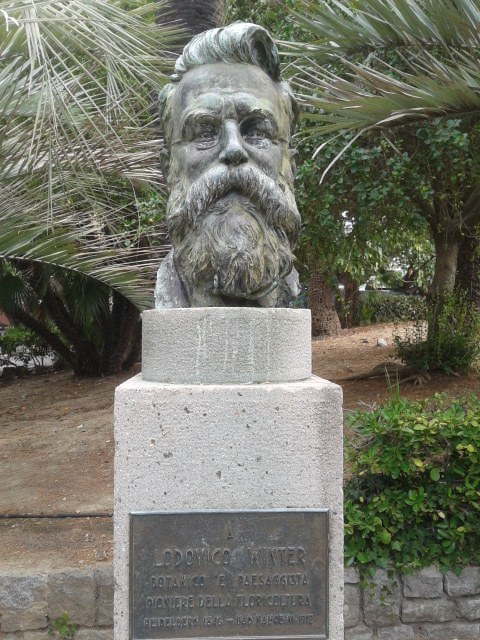
Ludwig Winter monument in town hall garden

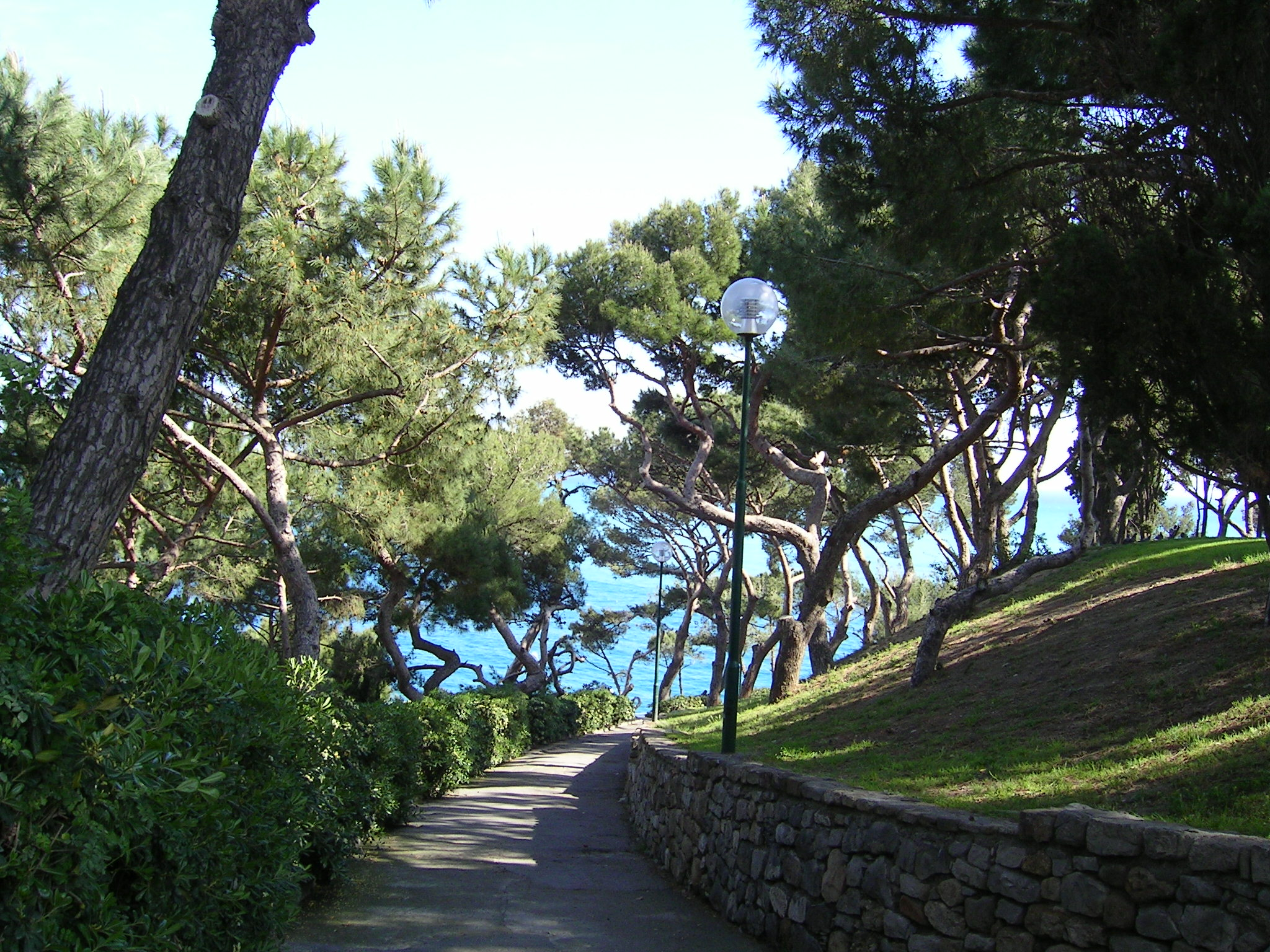
Pineta del Capo, Bordighera

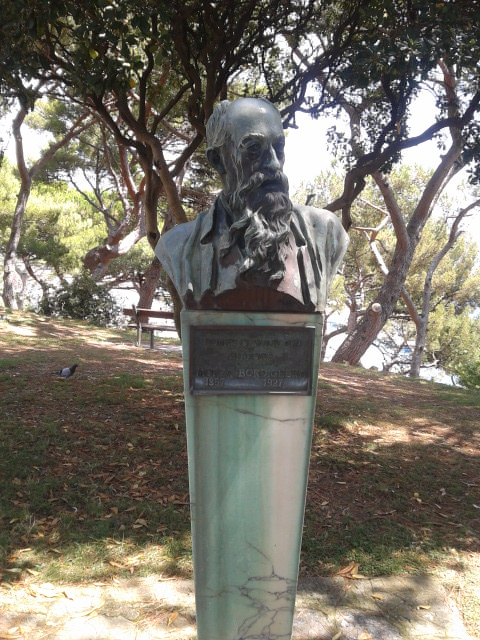
Mosè Bianchi monument in Pineta del Capo, Bordighera

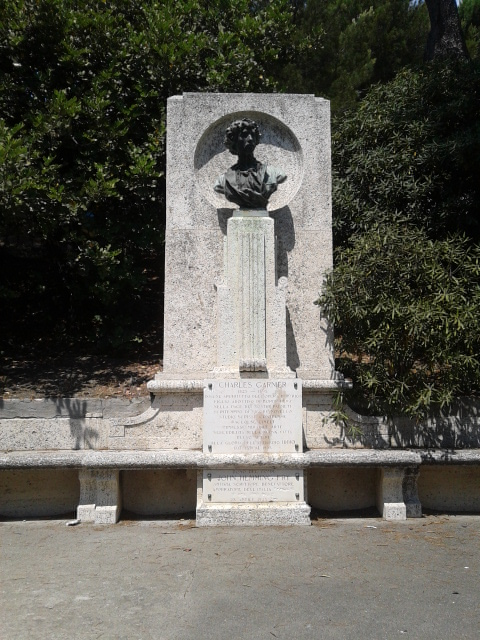
Charles Garnier monument in Pineta del Capo, Bordighera

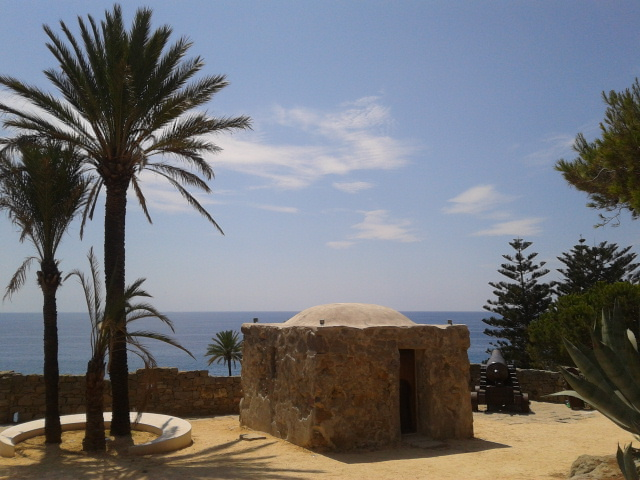
Marabutto, Pineta del Capo, Bordighera
