= Villa Garnier =

Villa Garnier (Bordighera)
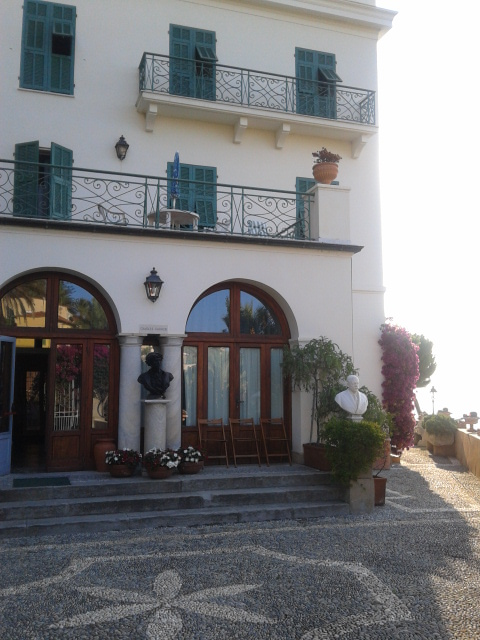
- Villa Garnier (Bordighera)
- Interactive map of the Villa Garnier (Bordighera) area

General information
- Location: Bordighera, Italy
- Construction started: 1871
- Completed: 1873
- Client: Charles Garnier (architect)

Design and construction
- Architect: Charles Garnier (architect)
- Designations: Soprintendenze per i Beni Architettonici e Paesaggistici della Liguria

Villa Garnier is a building in Bordighera in western Italy. Villa Garnier and Villa Amica are part of the properties protected by the Superintendent of Ministry of Cultural Heritage and Activities and Tourism (Italy). The villa is located 11 Garnier Street in Bordighera on the Italian Riviera.

== History ==
In 1871 Charles Garnier (architect) left Paris and the building site of the Opera which was blocked due to the war with Prussia and the Paris Commune. The family moved to Menton hometown of his wife, Louise Bary and, visiting the surroundings, they discover Bordighera. Back in May 1871 Garnier chose a plot near the Arziglia, where to build his villa. Unfortunately, the land was already occupied by an old chapel dedicated to St. Sebastian, but which had been desecrated since serving as a school for boys in the country. The land was located outside the walls of the old town, down to the sea and next to fishermen beach, the famous Arziglia. To get the coveted land, Garnier decided to offer a considerable sum for the time, 6000 lire, which would be used to build a new school, much more modern and large. To facilitate the transaction, Garnier also offered the project for the new school, which included not only the boys section, but also one for girls and a kindergarten. The town accepted this generous offer.

The only known preparatory drawing of the house indicates that Garnier had planned Moorish arches for the tower of the villa. This option was not realized, but Moorish style is still present in the structure of the tower, slim and slender as an Arab minaret. Garnier had nicknamed the tower "mon mirador” (i.e. "my watchtower"), because of the beautiful view.

The villa is on three floors which are accessed via a wooden staircase that was commissioned in Paris and that was to cost 1,000 crowns, against the general budget of 75,000. On the ground floor you enter the villa through an arcade now enclosed by windows. The entrance is decorated with frescoes and drawings made by the friends of Garnier. As you enter on the right is the living room, much smaller than the dining room, where Garnier would entertain his guests. Behind the staircase a door leads to the dining room, particularly spacious and bright. The two rooms were linked by a corridor / porch closed by grates that the owners liked to call the "Lions’ cage” This room, now converted into a chapel, is decorated with a beautiful fresco of the villa and outbuildings then purchased by Garnier, as they were in the nineteenth century.

On the upper floors there were rooms for the family and guests. The main bedroom had five openings to enjoy the light, and from one of these you had access to the tower. The parental bedroom and that of their son communicated through an open loggia which was then closed to allow Christian to gather his collection of shells, fossils, maps etc.

The second floor was designed as a self-contained apartment for guests from there you could access to a splendid terrace which gave access to the tower and could admire the sea and the Arziglia. With time, Garnier expanded the villa incorporating land and small houses that were in the vicinity. The villa was finished in 1873, but it was only in January 1875 that the family moved to Bordighera for the winter months.

In Bordighera Garnier received many famous guests such as Jean-Louis-Ernest Meissonier and Gustave Boulanger. Their traces can still be seen today on the walls of the entrance, where you can admire caricatures made by these artists. In the villa you can still see some paintings by Jules Eugène Lenepveu, Alexandre Bida and Georges Clairin which were part of the collection of Garnier.

Garnier died in August 1898 in France, followed soon after by his beloved son Christian. His widow continued to come in Bordighera during the winter season, but no longer had the courage to return to the villa Garnier and decided to reside at Villa Amica. Upon her death, Louise left the villa to the Société de Géographie of Paris, including all the vessels, the works of art, books, etc. She also left 200,000 francs for the maintenance of the property, with the condition that the house was not to be sold. Despite this clause, in 1929 the villa was sold to the American art critic John Hemming Fry (1861-1946) who, in admiration, erected a monument to Garnier, on the Cape Pineta, on 28 April 1935.

The property then passed to the diocese of Ventimiglia and from 1954 to the Sisters of St. Joseph of Aosta.

== Les annexes ==
After building the villa, Garnier purchased land and property to expand it. No less than 29 acts of purchase were made. One of the first villas was Villa Negro (1877), located in the eastern part of the garden. The small pavilion, now missing, was transformed into a hammam on the advice of the family doctor and friend, Dr. Depraz. The small pavilion was enlarged on the south side and, on the north side a small pond was added, only 50 cm deep, to create a pleasant mirror effect. On the ground floor there were a steam bath, a tepidarium, a shower and a staircase leading upstairs. At this level you had the relaxation room, changing rooms and toilets. Two large windows allowed to admire the sea. When the villa was sold to the American painter Hemming Fry, the hammam was transformed into a studio.

On August 16, 1882 Garnier bought from Richard Domenico, Villa Modesta, located in current via Garnier 42. The villa is on three levels, connected by an external staircase. On the ground floor there was a large kitchen, on the first floor were a living room with fireplace and the dining room, on the second, the three main bedrooms, plus a small room for the servants. In 1900 the Garnier widow enlarged the two upper floors on the west side.

Around 1883 Garnier had already bought from Giuseppe Ballauco Villa Minima. The property, which was rebuilt by the new owner, was probably around number 50 of the via Garnier. Garnier called it “Minima” due to its small size. The villa had an inverted L shape and was developed mainly in depth. On the ground floor there were the rooms reserved for the servants. On the first floor, on the south side a lounge with fireplace and the dining room, on the north one the kitchen and the pantry. Upstairs there were three bedrooms and a bathroom. The three levels of the villa communicated through an external staircase covered by a roof probably made of wood. During the railway works and the extension of the Via Aurelia, a large part of the garden was expropriated and the house was later demolished and rebuilt by the new owner, Maurizio Lega.

We do not know the exact date of purchase of Villa Amica but it was already owned by the Garnier family in 1883. The villa, which still exists, is located at 2, Via Garnier. There are no original drawings of the internal structure of the house but you can assume that the interior layout of the premises was similar to neighboring villas. Unfortunately, the garden was reduced due to an expropriation of about 400 square meters. The villa, which is surely the most beautiful outbuilding purchased by Garnier, became the main residence of the widow Garnier after the death of her husband and beloved son. Louise did not have the courage to continue living at Villa Garnier, then she left the main house intact, as if the whole family had to return there and moved to Villa Amica. In 1919, Louise left the villa to her godson and will executor Armand Girette.

The most famous annex was Villa Studio, the only one built from scratch by Garnier. The villa, which is located in via Garnier 22, was built to house the studio of the famous architect. In 1884 the health of his beloved son Christian, had deteriorated and his father decided to give him his studio in villa Granier and make a new one for him. First Garnier realized a large water tank that stretched up to Villa Amica. The villa is on three levels, of which the ground floor and the first formed an independent house. On the ground floor there were utility rooms, kitchen, dining room and living room, connected to the upper floor via a ladder reaching directly into the master bedroom. On the first floor there were then two bedrooms, a bathroom and two small additional rooms. The study was on the top floor with an area of seven by five meters. A large central fireplace and a beamed ceiling gave warmth to the room and two large windows illuminated the study, allowing you to admire the sea and the fishermen's bay, called Arziglia. Adjacent to the study there were a restroom and the toilet. The villa had an adjoining garden, graced by the famous Bordighera palm trees and a vegetable garden connecting the property with Villa Amica. Upon Garnier's death, the building was rented out and, in 1913, Hemming Fry asked the Garnier widow, Louise, to make some changes. In 1919 villa Studio was inherited by Silvia Giuseppina Busquet, wife of the French editor Charles Fouquet.

== The gardens ==
The gardens are the result of a collaboration between Garnier, his son Christian and Ludwig Winter. The villa was, from the beginning, framed by a beautiful palm grove. The plot of 6000m², was structured in terraces on which exotic plants were cultivated. It is said that at the time there were about 600 different species, including olive trees, figs and lemons. Today the garden has a smaller size, about 2500m², but it has a rich collection: 10 different types of palm, a Dracaena draco and a variety of trees, including a copy of Nolina longifolia. In the garden you can still see a bust of Charles Garnier by the French sculptor Jean-Baptiste Carpeaux and a column from the Tuileries Palace in Paris.

== Photo gallery ==
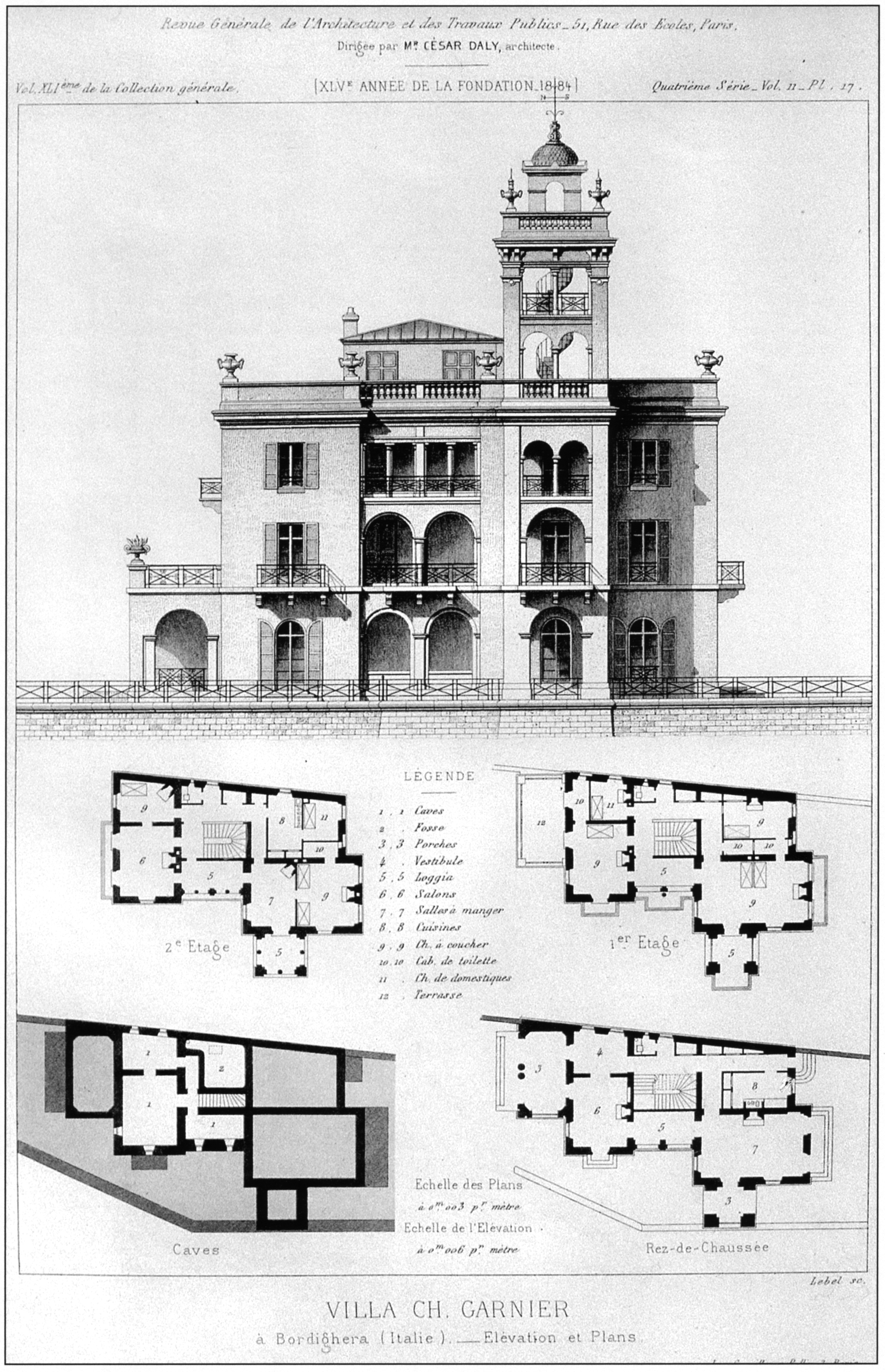
Villa Garnier Bordighera - Bonillo 2004 p88

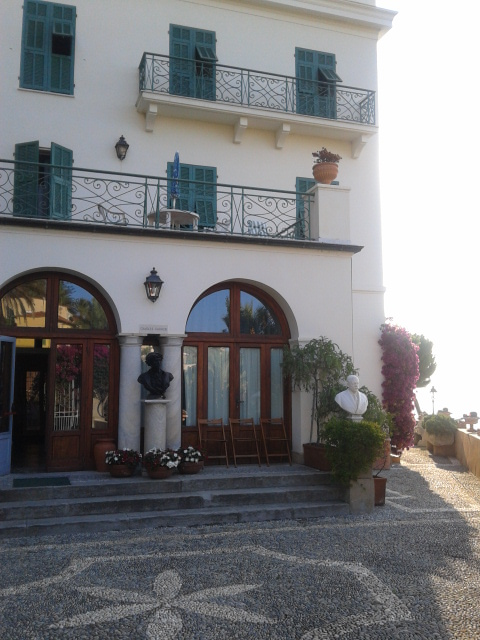
Villa Garnier, facade

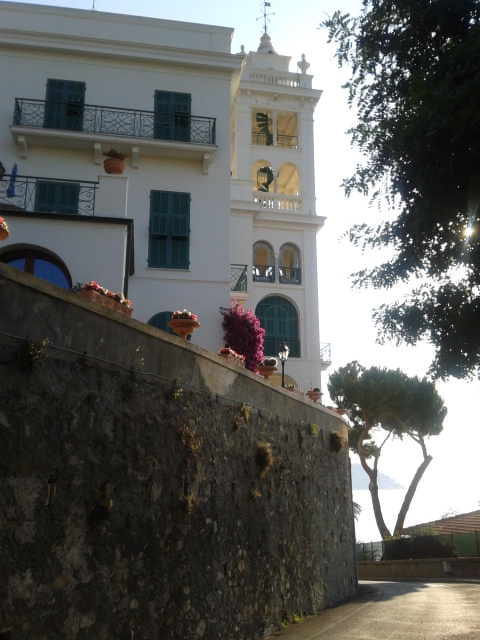
Villa Garnier with tower

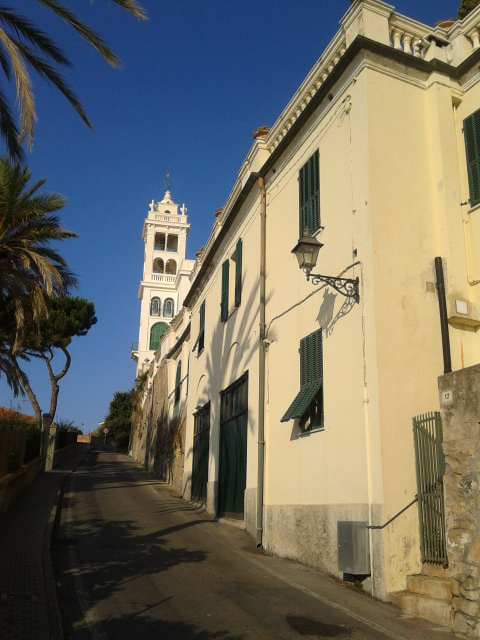
Villa Garnier, retro

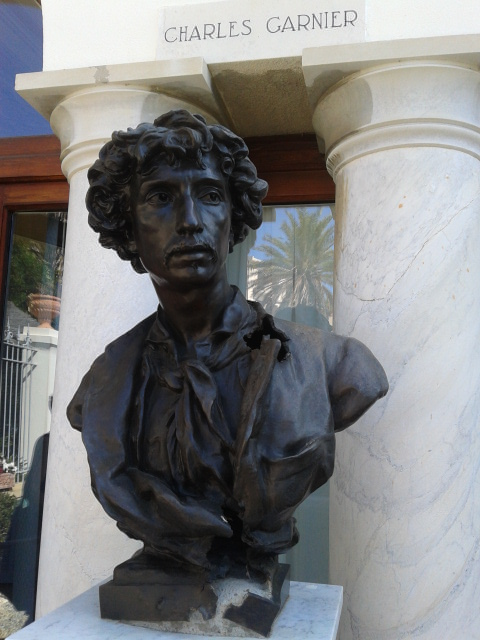
Bust of Charles Garnier in Villa Garnier, Bordighera

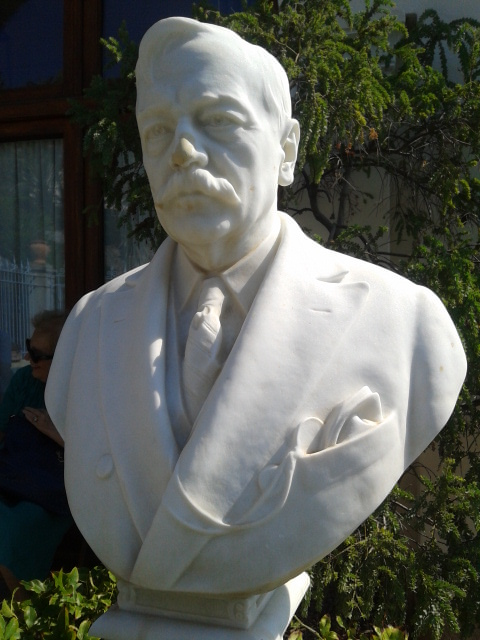
Bust of Mr Hemming Fry in Villa Garnier, Bordighera

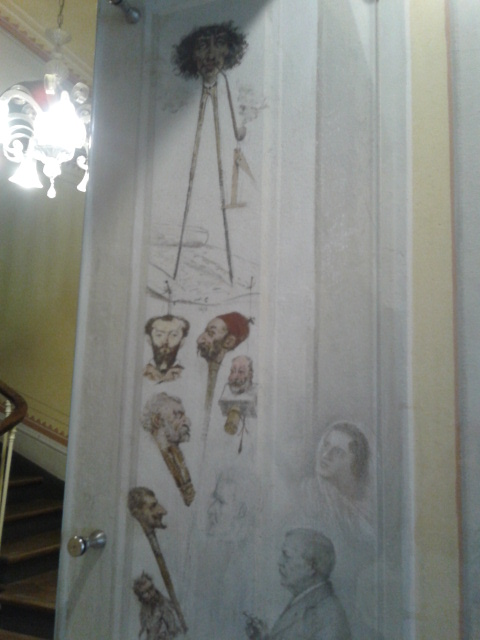
Caricatures in the lobby of Villa Garnier, Bordighera

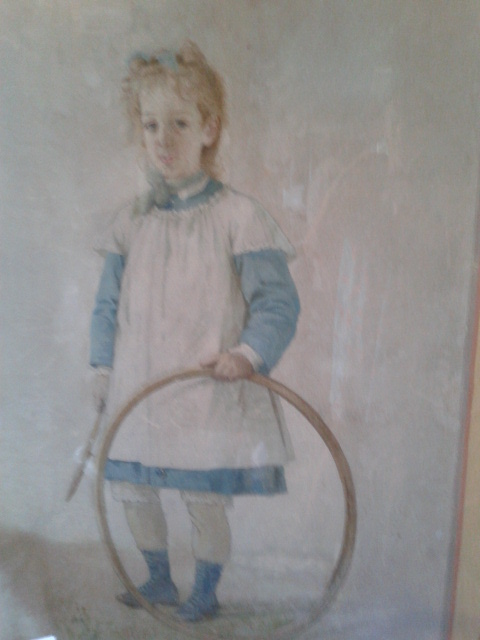
Christian Garnier as a kid in Villa Garnier, Bordighera

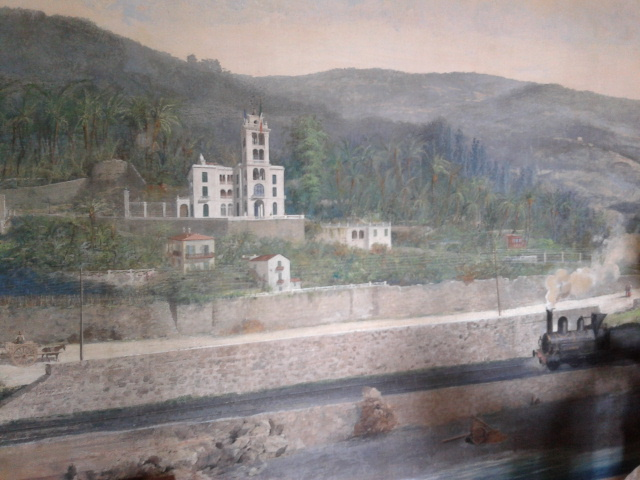
Fresque in the “Lion’s Cage”, with Villa Garnier, villa Minima, villa Modesta and villa Negro, Bordighera

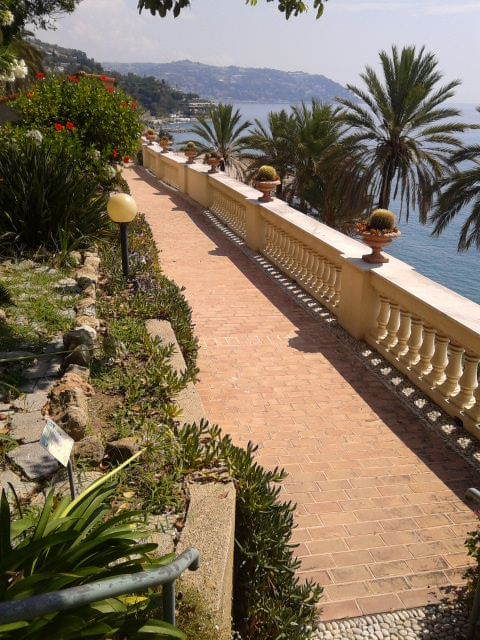
Villa Garnier, balcony

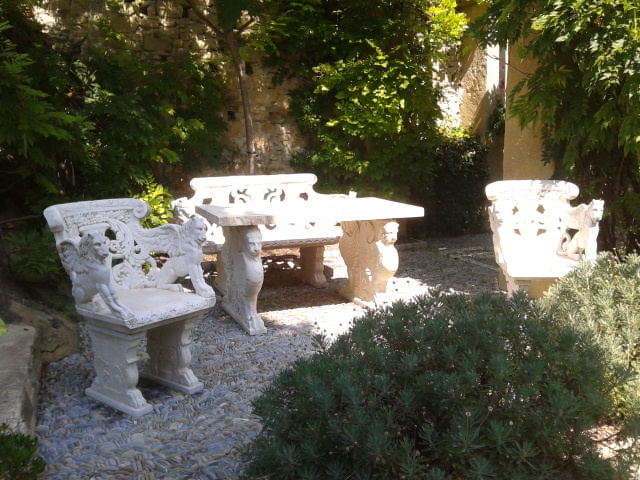
Villa Garnier, the garden

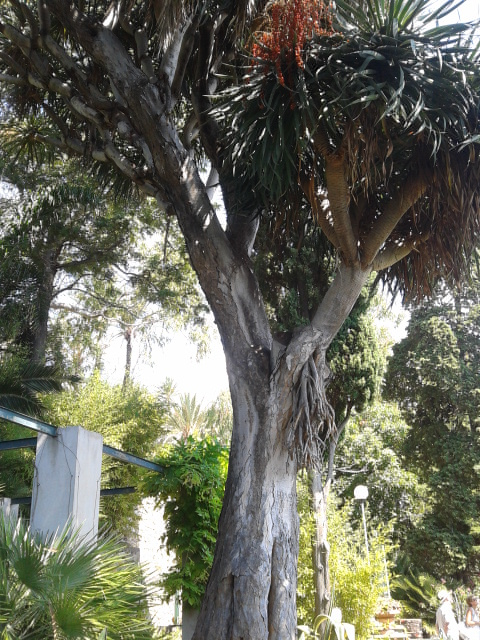
Villa Garnier, Dracaena draco

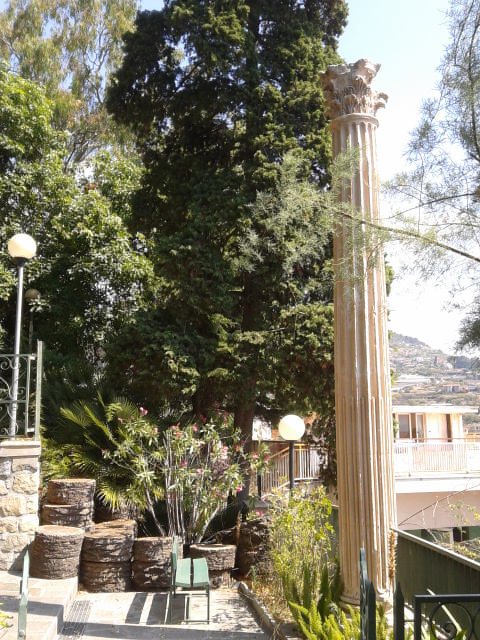
Villa Garnier, column from the Tuileries

== Notes ==
43°46′54″N 7°40′33″E
