= Jules Pierre van Biesbroeck =

Belgian Orientalist artist

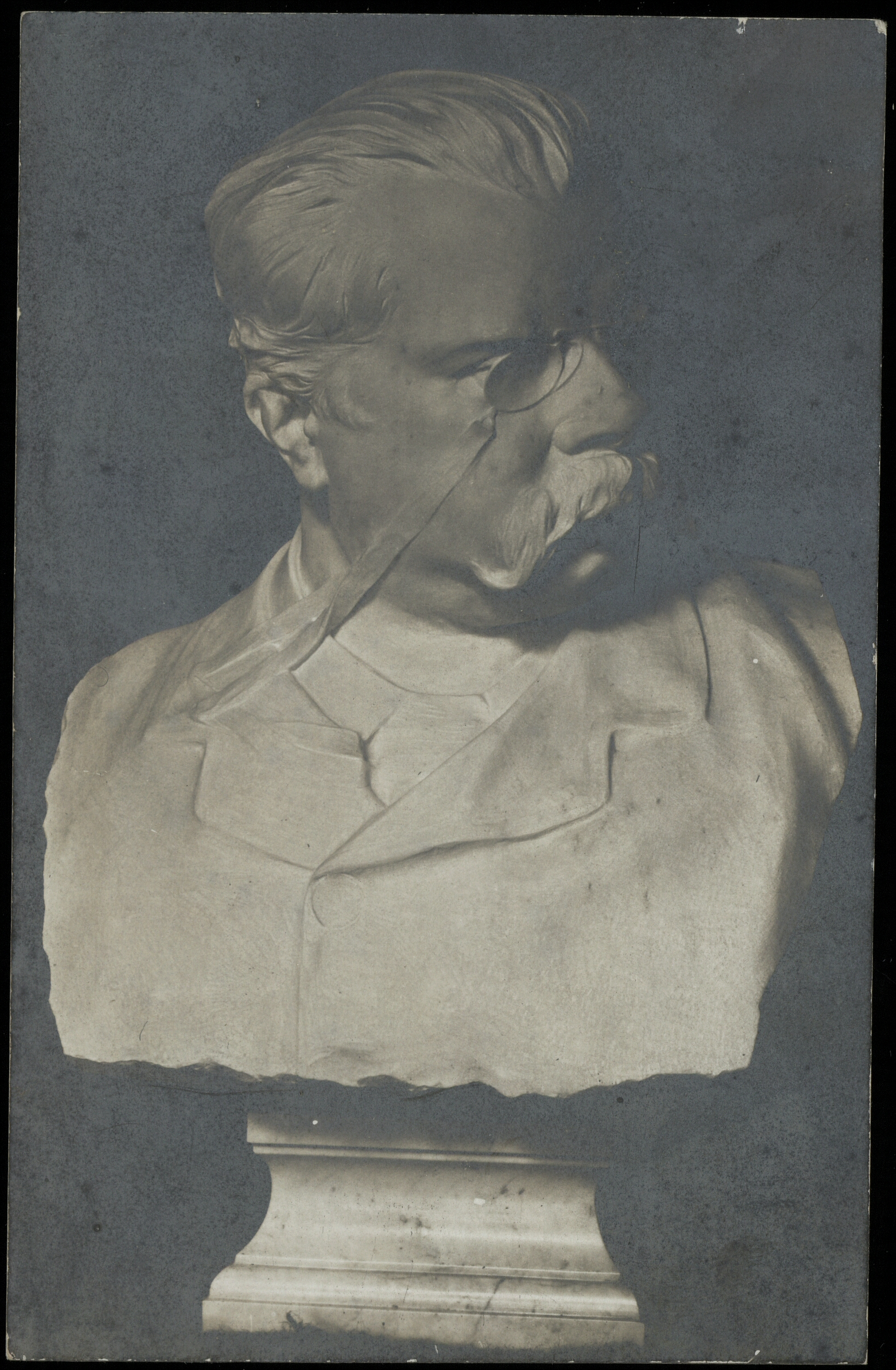
- Bust of Jules Pierre van Biesbroeck (unknown sculptor)
- Born: 25 October 1873; Portici, Italy
- Died: 27 January 1965 (aged 91); Bruxelles
- Known for: Painter, sculptor
- Notable work: "Le Pâtre", "Le lancement d'Argo "

Jules Pierre van Biesbroeck (25 October 1873 – 27 January 1965) was a Belgian Orientalist artist.

== Life and career ==
He was the son of Jules Evarist van Biesbroeck, a painter of Ghent, but was born in Italy, in Portici, near Naples, while his parents were staying there. (In the 19th century many artists made educational trips to Italy). It was a long visit: the child was two years old by the time the family returned to Ghent.

After a short period of practice with his father, van Biesbroeck was enrolled in the Academy of Fine Arts in Ghent. His first painting, "The Shepherd" (French: Le pâtre), was sold at the Triennale in Ghent. In 1888, when he was only 15 years old, he made his debut at the "Salon des Champs-Elysées" in Paris with his monumental work "The Launch of the Argo" (French: Le lancement d'Argo). The very large canvas, 7.5 by 2.6 meters, caused quite a stir because of the nakedness of his figures. When van Biesbroeck was called to Paris, his youth amazed viewers; to everyone's surprise, he obtained a "special mention". However, in order to exhibit the picture publicly, the figures had to be covered with drapery.

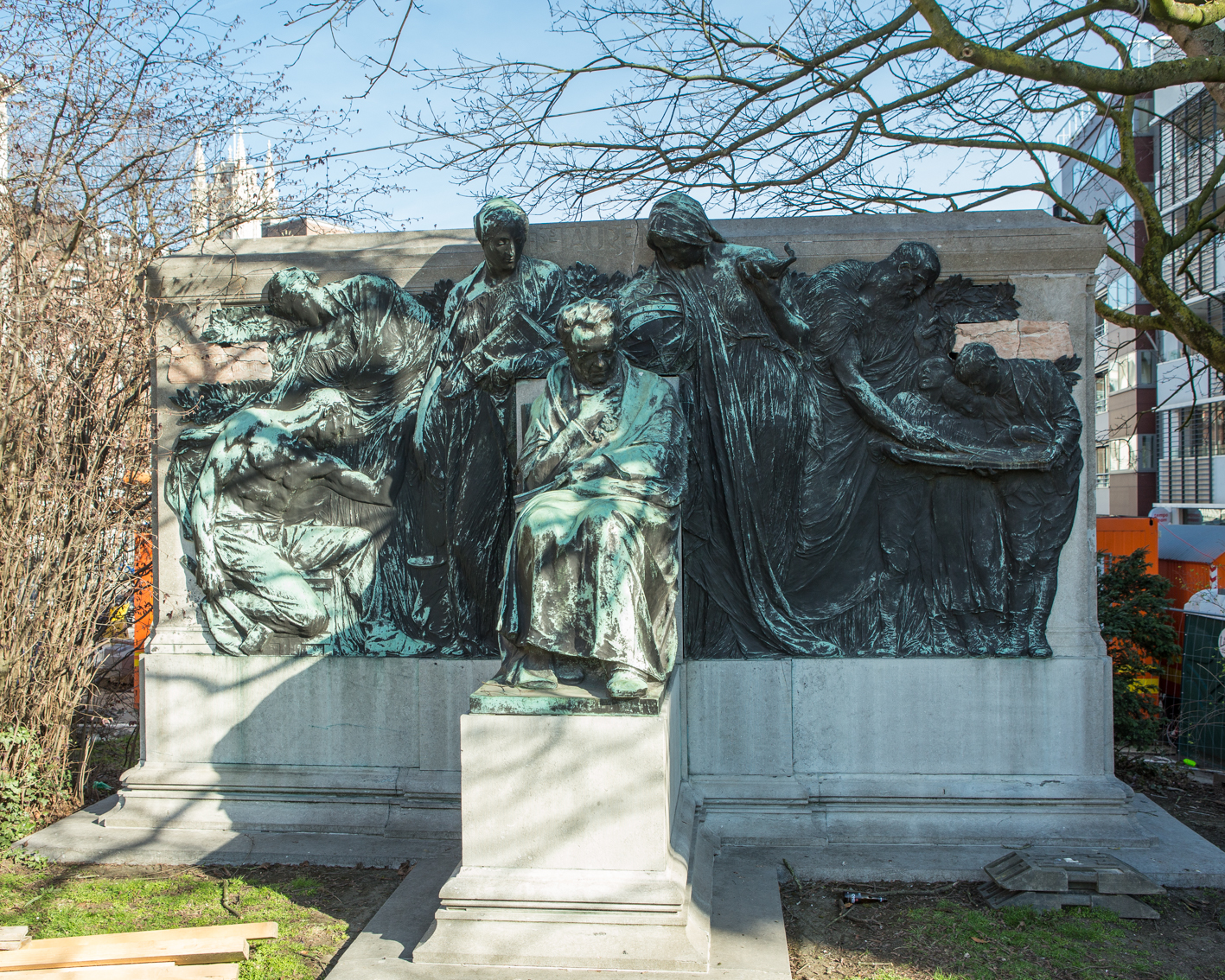
Statue in honour of François Laurent in Ghent, designed by Jules van Biesbroeck

In 1895 he began to devote himself to sculpture and his talent was rewarded by various commissions, including a monument to François Laurent for a square in Ghent and another in honour of Jean Volders. In 1897 he came second in the Belgian "Prix de Rome" for sculpture after Henri Boncquet and in 1898 he came second in the section devoted to painting.

When German troops invaded Belgium during World War I, he fled Ghent and went to Bordighera in Italy where he continued to paint and sculpt. He also gave art lessons to foreign residents of the town. In Italy his painting “Deposition" is on display in the Church of the Immaculate Conception in Bordighera.

In 1926 he made a trip to North Africa, where he was charmed by Algeria. The light and atmosphere of Maghreb pushed him to use lighter colours and engage with oriental subjects. Algiers had such an influence on him that he lived there for nine years until 1938. His studio, called "La Volière”, became extremely well-known throughout the city.

In 1938 he returned to Ghent where he remained till his death in 1965.

== See also ==
- List of Orientalist artists
