= Charles Garnier (architect) =

French architect (1825–1898)

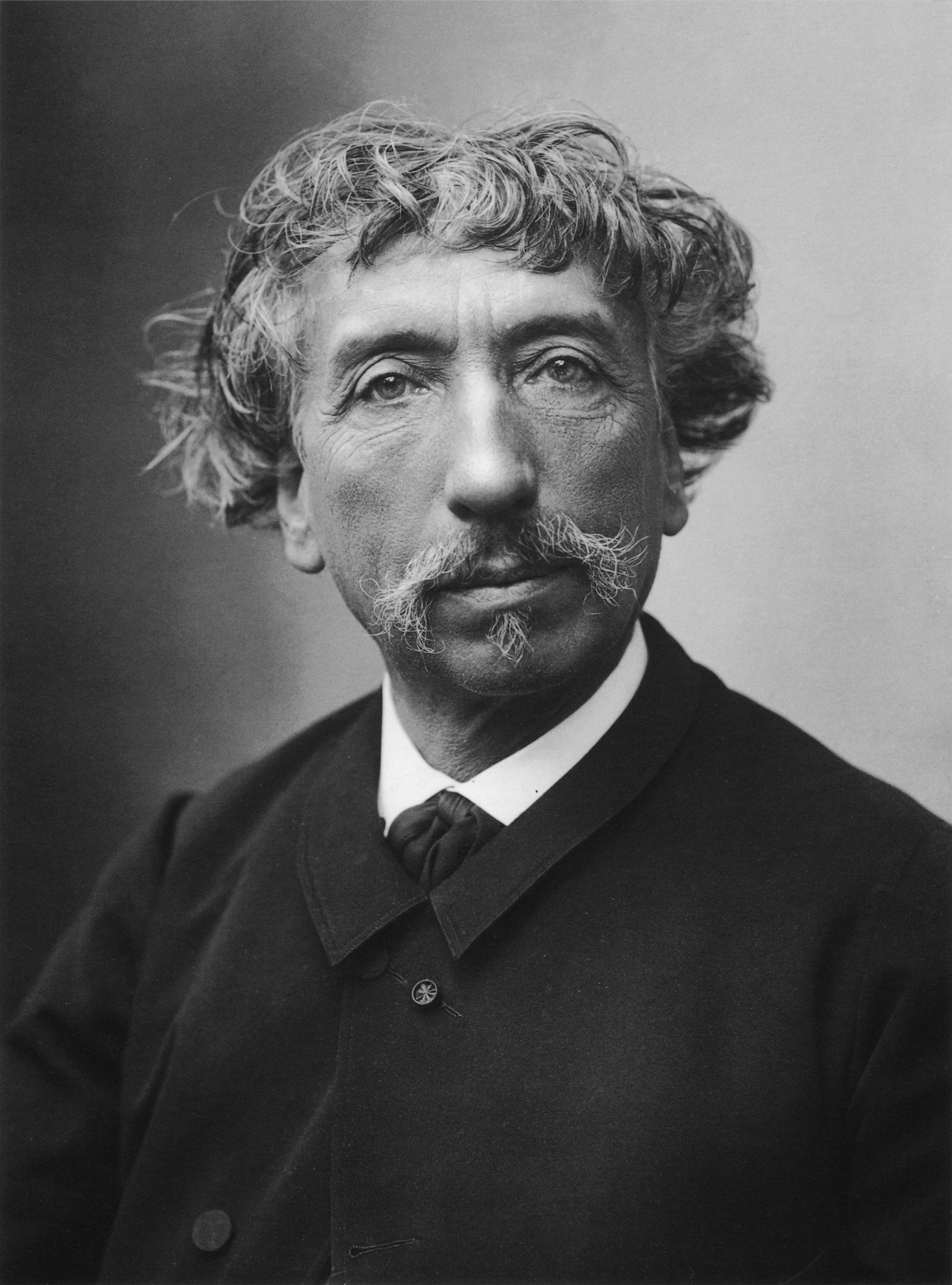
- Garnier by Nadar, c. 1880
- Born: Jean-Louis Charles Garnier; 6 November 1825; Paris, France
- Died: 3 August 1898 (aged 72); Paris, France
- Resting place: Montparnasse Cemetery, Paris
- Occupation: Architect
- Awards: 1848 Prix de Rome
- Buildings: Palais Garnier (Paris Opera); Opéra de Monte-Carlo

Jean-Louis Charles Garnier (pronounced [ʃaʁl ɡaʁnje]; 6 November 1825 – 3 August 1898) was a French architect, best known as the architect of the Palais Garnier in Paris and the Opéra de Monte-Carlo.

== Early life ==
Charles Garnier was born Jean-Louis Charles Garnier on 6 November 1825 in Paris, on the Rue Mouffetard, in the present-day 5th arrondissement. His father, Jean André Garnier, 1796–1865, who was originally from Sarthe, a department of the French region of Pays de la Loire, had worked as a blacksmith, wheelwright, and coachbuilder before settling down in Paris to work in a horse-drawn carriage rental business. He married Felicia Colle, daughter of a captain in the French Army.

Later in life Garnier would all but ignore the fact that he was born of humble origins, preferring to claim Sarthe as his birthplace.

== Education ==
Garnier became an apprentice of Louis-Hippolyte Lebas, and after that a full-time student of the École royale des Beaux-Arts de Paris, beginning during 1842. He obtained the Premier Grand Prix de Rome in 1848 at age twenty-three. The subject of his final examination was titled:"Un conservatoire des arts et métiers, avec galerie d'expositions pour les produits de l'industrie".

He became a pensioner of the Académie de France à Rome from 17 January 1849 to 31 December 1853. He traveled through Greece providing him the subject of his fourth year submission, presented at the Paris Salon of 1853. He visited Greece with Edmond About and Constantinople with Théophile Gautier. He worked on the Temple of Aphaea in Aegina where he insisted on polychromy. He was named in 1874 member of the Institut de France in the architecture section of the Académie des Beaux-Arts.

== Paris Opera ==
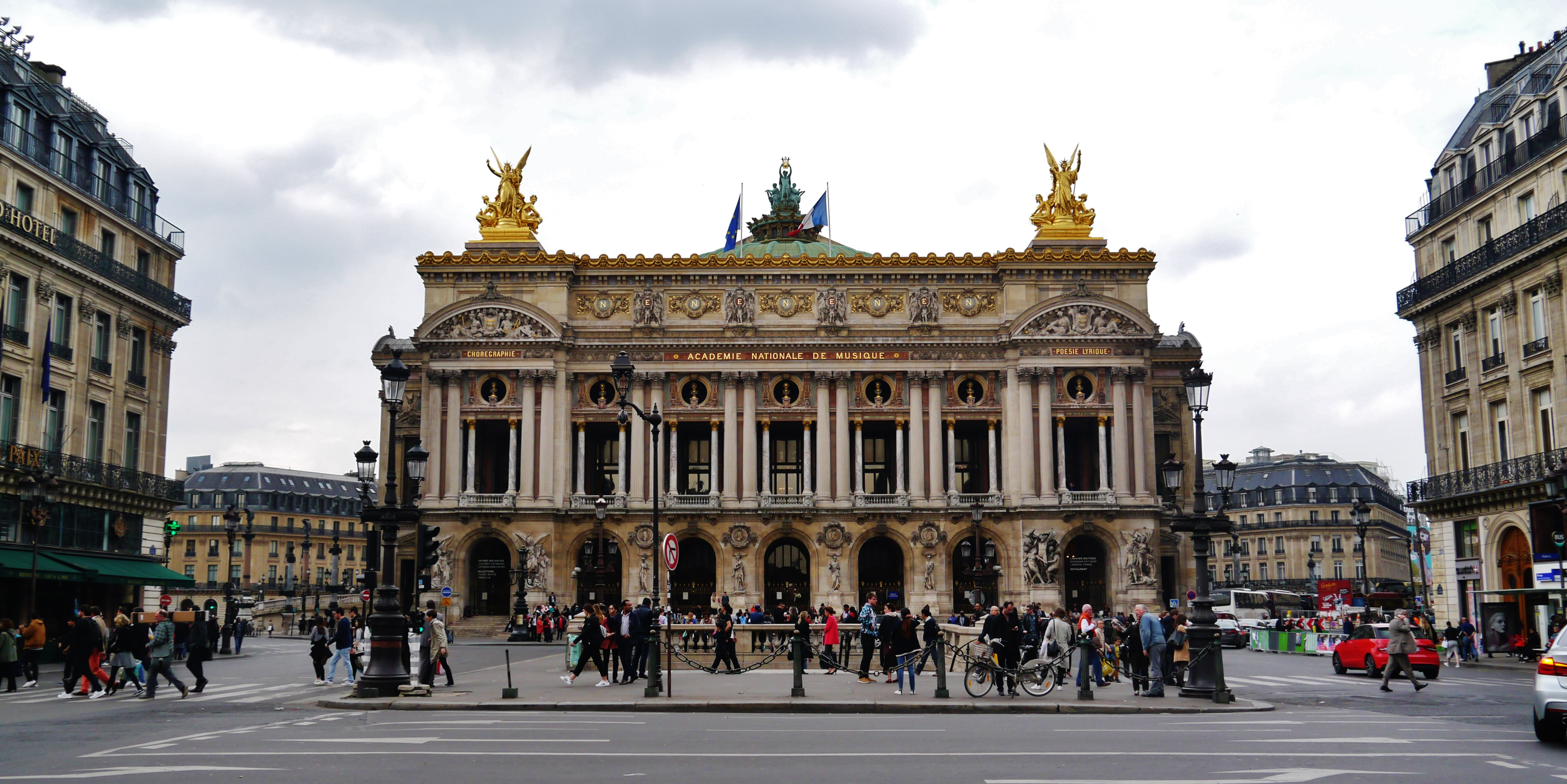
The Palais Garnier in April 2017

On 30 December 1860 the Second Empire of Emperor Napoleon III announced a competition for the design of a new, state-funded opera house. The old opera house, located on the rue Le Peletier and known as the Salle Le Peletier, had been constructed as a temporary theatre in 1821. Street access to that theatre was greatly constricted; and after an attempted assassination of Napoleon III at the theatre's entrance on 14 January 1858, it was decided to build a new opera house with a separate, more secure entrance for the head of state.

Applicants were given a month to submit entries. There were two phases to the competition, and Garnier was one of about 170 entrants in the first phase. He was awarded the fifth-place prize and was one of seven finalists selected for the second phase. The second phase required the contestants to revise their original projects and was more rigorous, with a 58-page program, written by the director of the Opéra, Alphonse Royer, which the contestants received on 18 April. The new submissions were sent to the jury in the middle of May, and on 29 May Garnier's project was selected for its "rare and superior qualities in the beautiful distribution of the plans, the monumental and characteristic aspect of the facades and sections".

Garnier's wife Louise later wrote that the French architect Alphonse de Gisors, who was on the jury, had commented to them that Garnier's project was "remarkable in its simplicity, clarity, logic, grandeur, and because of the exterior dispositions which distinguish the plan in three distinct parts—the public spaces, auditorium, and stage ... 'you have greatly improved your project since the first competition; whereas Ginain [the first-place winner in the first phase] has ruined his.'"

Soon the thirty-five-year-old and relatively unknown Garnier began work on the building, which eventually would be named for him, the Palais Garnier. Many people had difficulty in deciding exactly what style he was trying to portray. When asked by Empress Eugénie in what style the building was to be done, he is said to have replied: "Why Ma'am, in Napoleon Trois, and you complain!"

Construction began in the summer of 1861, though setbacks would delay it for another fourteen years. During the first week of excavation, an underground stream was discovered, rendering the ground too unstable for a foundation. It required eight months for the water to be pumped out, though enough was left in the area which eventually became the fifth cellar for operating the hydraulic stage machinery above. Garnier's double-walled and bitumen-sealed cement and concrete foundation proved strong enough to withstand any possible leakages, and construction continued.

The defeat of the French army by the Prussians at the Battle of Sedan in 1870 resulted in the end of the Second Empire. During the Siege of Paris and the Paris Commune in 1871, the unfinished Opera was used as a warehouse for goods, as well as a military prison.

The opera house was finally inaugurated on 5 January 1875. Many of the most prestigious monarchs of Europe attended the opening ceremony, including the President of France's new Republic, Marshal MacMahon, the Lord Mayor of London, and King Alfonso XII of Spain.

The people who entered the massive building, spanning nearly 119,000 square feet (11,100 m^{2}), were generally awed by its immense size and extensive ornamentation. Claude Debussy described it as resembling a railway station on the outside, and that the interior could easily be mistaken for a Turkish bath.

Garnier's works represent a Neo-Baroque-inspired style, popular during the Beaux-Arts period in France. He was influenced by the Italianate styles of Renaissance artisans such as Palladio, Sansovino, and Michelangelo, perhaps the result of his many visits to Greece and Rome during his lifetime. He was also a pioneer of architectural beauty as well as function; his opera was built on a framework of metal girders, unprecedented at the time. Aside from being fireproof, steel and iron was much stronger than wood, allowing it to successfully withstand the countless heavy tons of marble and other materials heaped upon it without breaking.

== Later work ==
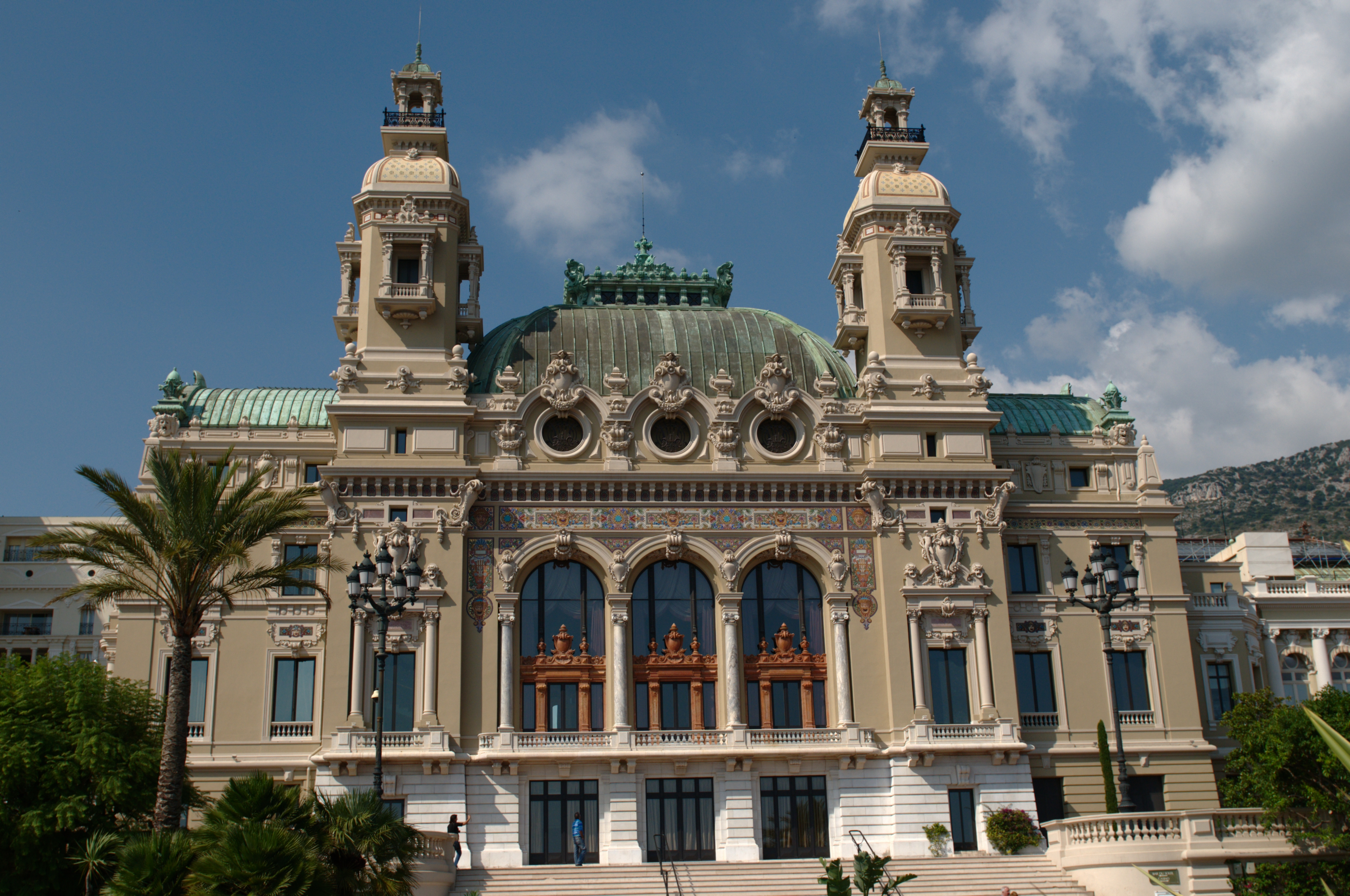
Seaside facade of the Monte Carlo Casino Theatre, designed by Garnier

In 1872 and 1873 Garnier built a vacation home on the Italian Riviera, the Villa Garnier in Bordighera. He was one of the first to build there after the arrival of the railroad in 1871 and later contributed various private and public buildings to the town until his death in 1898. Other architectural contributions include the Grand Concert Hall of the Monte Carlo Casino (1876/79–1879, since remodeled as the Opéra de Monte-Carlo) and the Salle de Jeu Trente-et-Quarante (1880–81), both on the Place du Casino in Monte-Carlo; the Nice Astronomical Observatory (1879–88); the Cercle de la Librairie, 117 boulevard Saint-Germain in Paris (1878–80); the Hôtel Hachette, 195 boulevard Saint-Germain in Paris (1878–1881); the Panorama Marigny in Paris (1880–82); now the Marigny Theatre); and his last work, the Magasin (storehouse) de Décors de l'Opéra on the rue Berthier in Paris (1894–95; now the Ateliers Berthier of the Odéon-Théâtre de l'Europe).

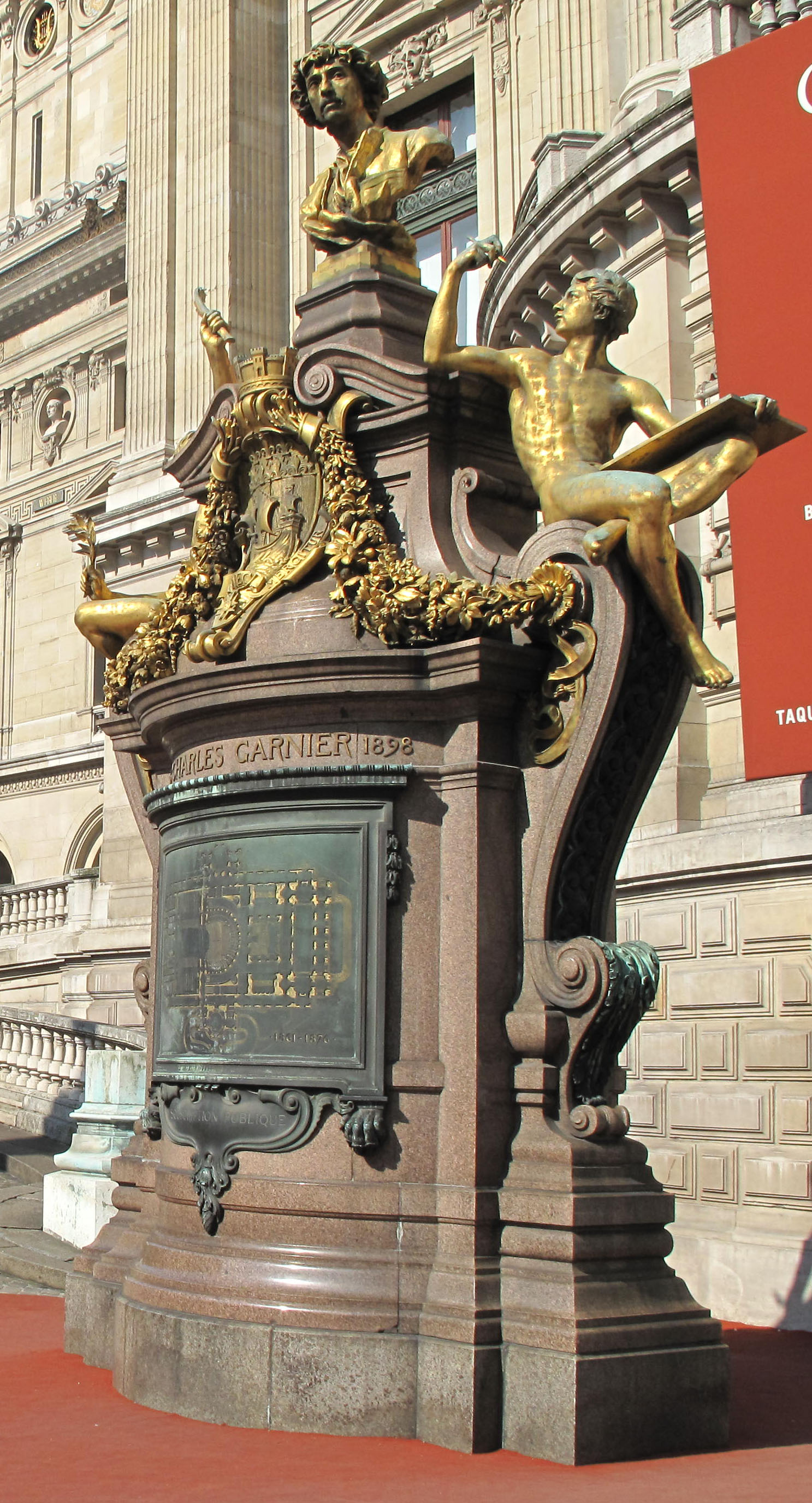
Monument to Garnier at the Palais Garnier

== Death ==
Garnier retired from his private architectural practice in 1896, but continued to serve on juries for architectural competitions and to appear at official functions. He suffered a first stroke at 4 o'clock in the morning on 2 August 1898 while at home in Paris, and a second stroke the following evening, dying at 8 o'clock in the evening. He was interred in the Montparnasse cemetery. After his death a public monument (completed in 1902 to designs by Jean-Louis Pascal and crowned with a copy of the bust of Garnier, which had been created by Jean-Baptiste Carpeaux in 1869) was erected west of the Rotonde de l'Empereur of the Palais Garnier. The huge ornate granite pedestal was created in Aberdeen by Alexander McDonald & Co.

== Works ==
=== In France ===
- In Paris :
  - Palais Garnier (1861–1875)
  - Panorama Français (1880–1882; demolished)
  - Panorama Marigny (1880–82); remodeled 1894 as the Théâtre Marigny)
  - The Cercle de la Librairie (1878–1880), 117 boulevard Saint-Germain)
  - Maison "Opéra" (1867–1880), a hôtel particulier, 5 rue du Docteur Lancereaux
  - Tomb of Jacques Offenbach, cimetière de Montmartre (1880)
  - The Ateliers Berthier (1894–1898), on the boulevard of the same name, the annex of the Opéra and its fabrication workshops for decorations and storage of costumes and scenery. This building was his last realisation.
- In Provence :
  - Villa Eilenroc (1867), Cap d'Antibes
  - Villa Maria Serena (1882), 21 promenade Reine-Astrid, Menton (attributed)
  - The casino and thermal baths of Vittel (built 1883–1884; baths much modified after 1897; casino destroyed by fire in 1930 and replaced with a different structure)
  - Église Sainte-Grimonie (1886) in La Capelle
  - The Astronomical Observatory in Nice (1881–1888, in collaboration with the engineer Gustave Eiffel)

=== Abroad ===
The information concerning Garnier's work on the Italian Riviera is taken from the inventory of Bouvier.

- In Monaco :
  - Grand Concert Hall of the Monte Carlo Casino (1876/78–1879; remodeled by Henri Schmit in 1897)
  - Trente-Quarante Gaming Room of the Monte Carlo Casino (1878–1880/81; modified at the end of the 19th century, little of Garnier's work remains)
- In Bordighera, Italy:
  - Villa Garnier (1872–1873)
  - Town hall of Bordighera (1872–1878)
  - Villa Bischoffsheim (1876–1879/80; now Villa Etelinda)
  - Church of the Immaculate Conception or Terrasanta(1879/83–1898)
  - Villa Studio (1884; Garnier's studio near the Villa Garnier)

== Gallery ==
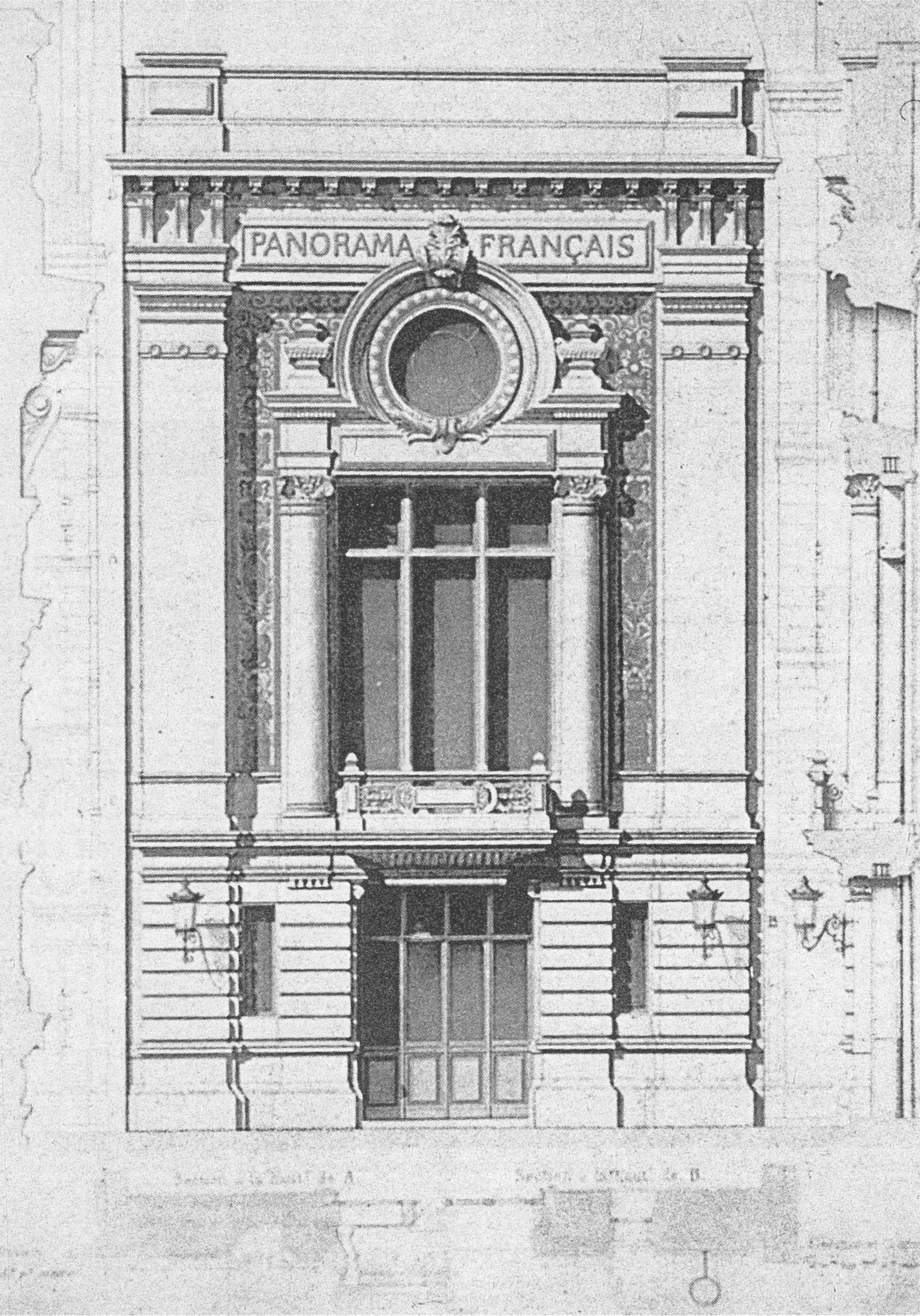
Panorama Français, facade

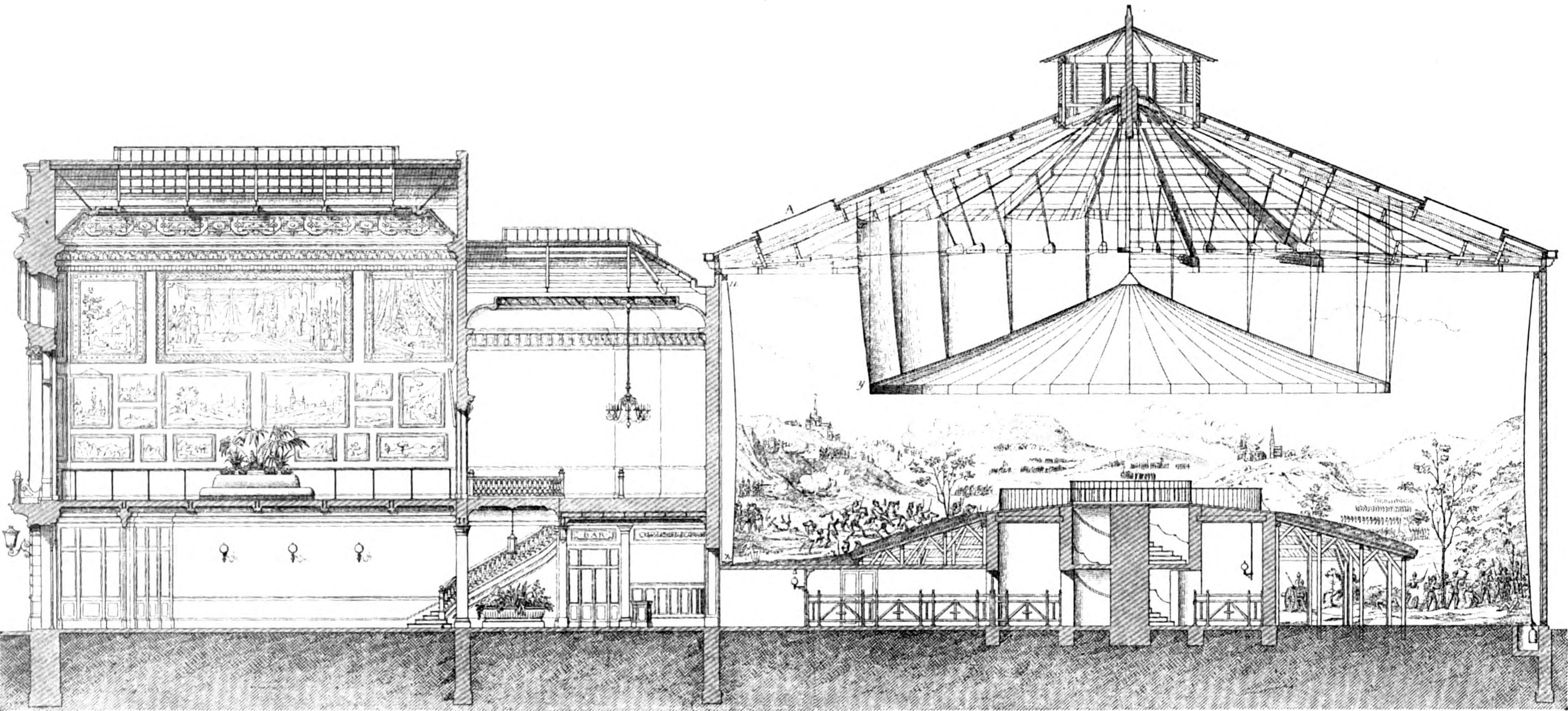
Panorama Français, long section

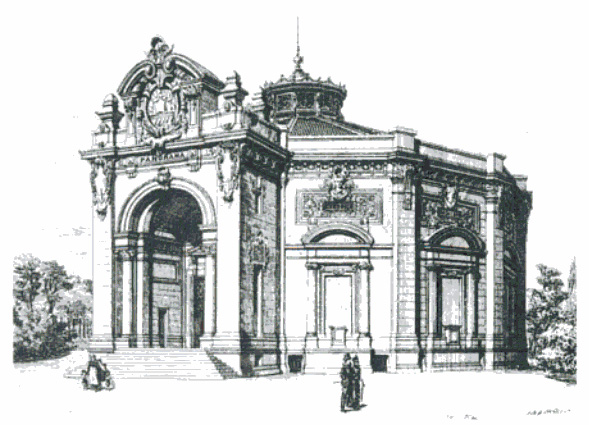
Panorama Marigny, Paris

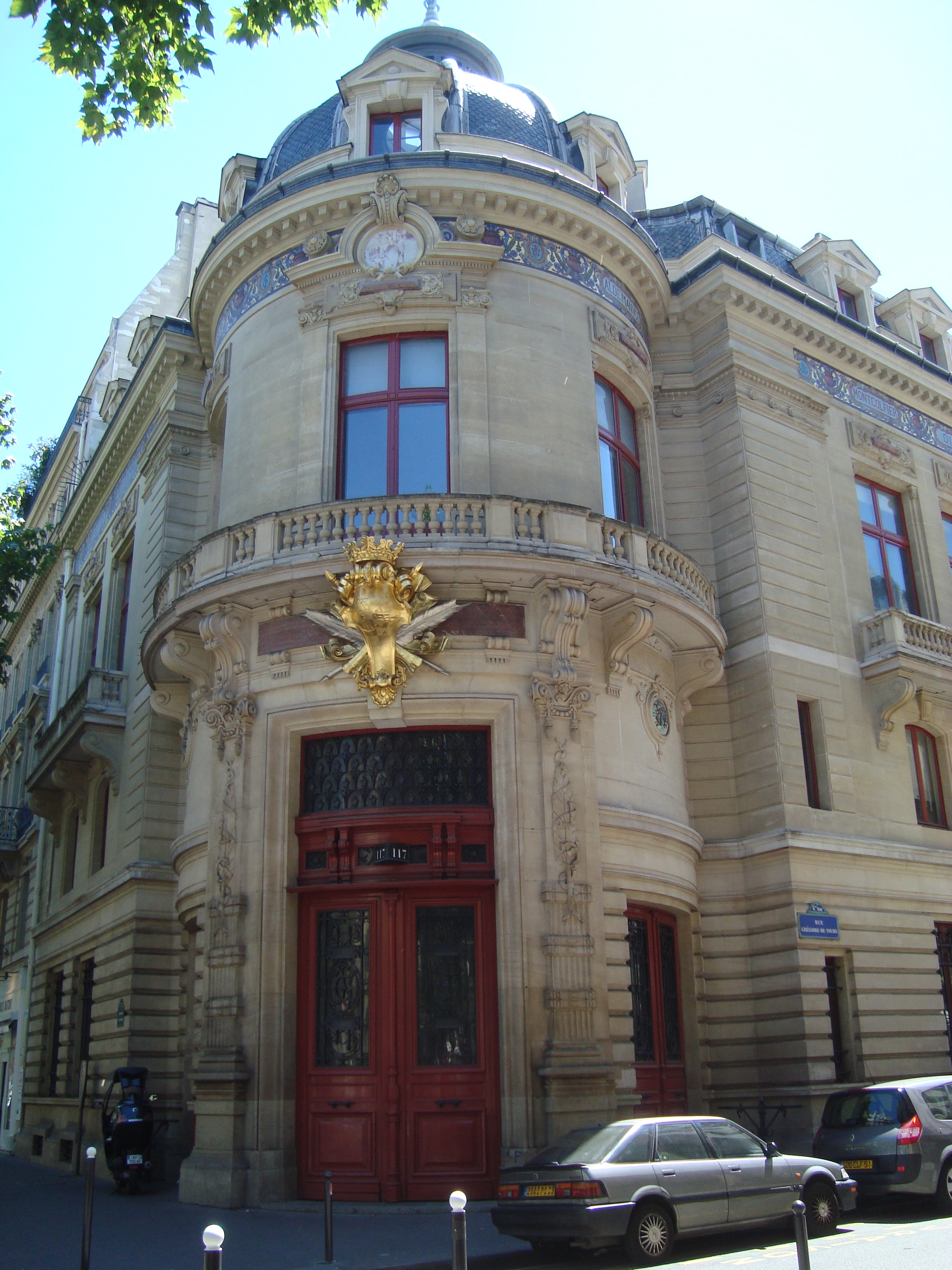
Cercle de la Librairie, Paris

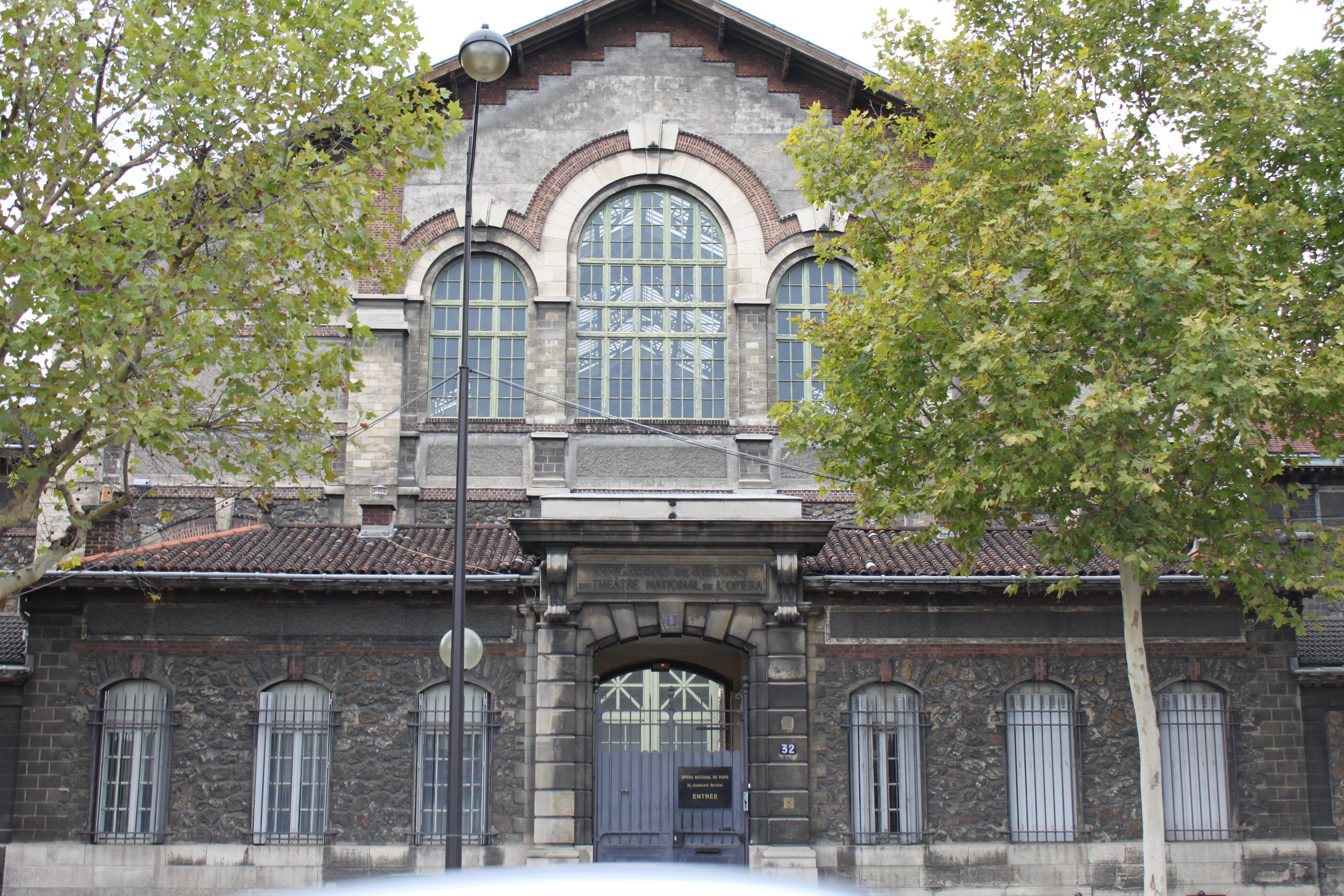
Ateliers Berthier, Paris

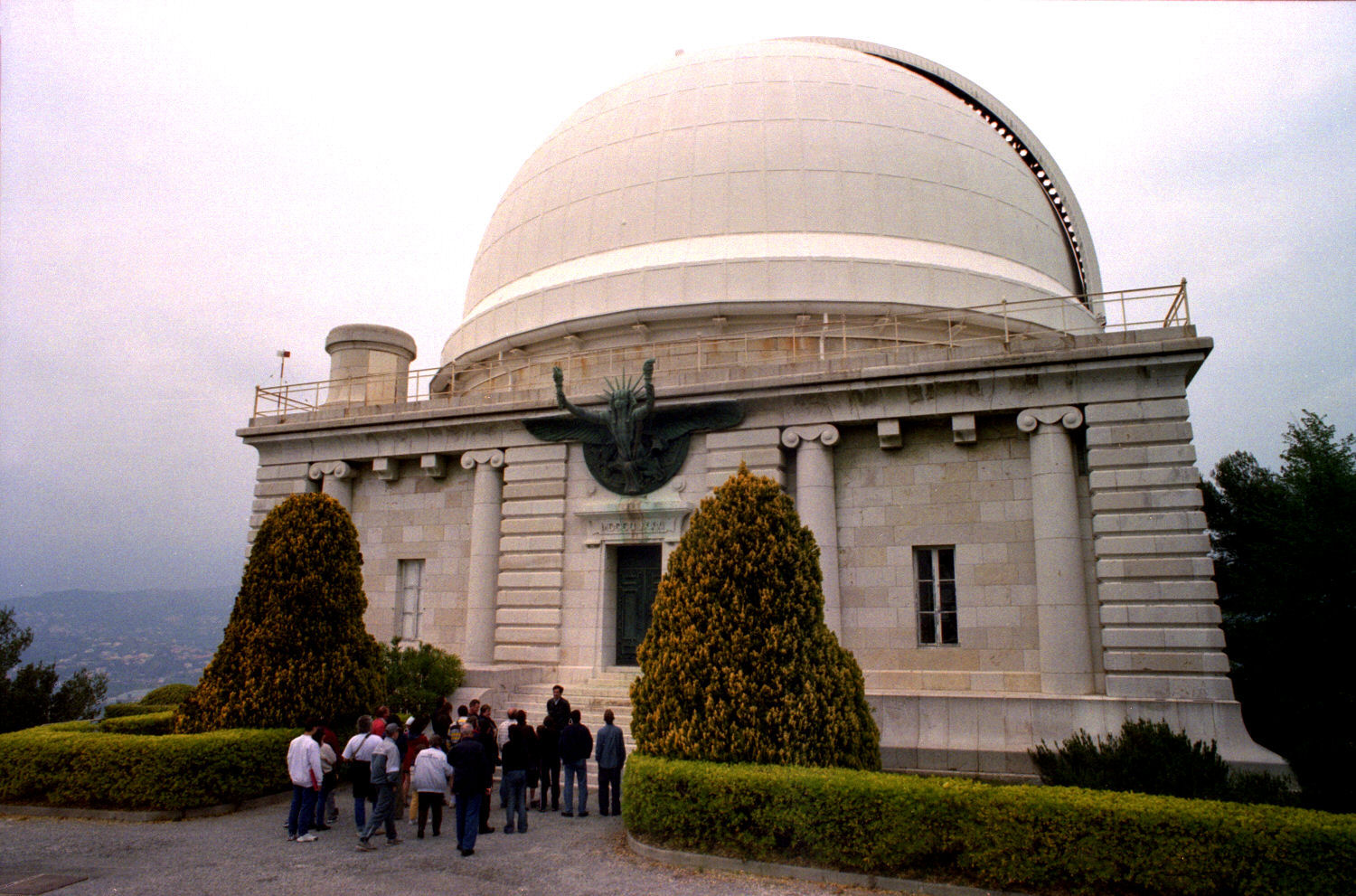
Nice Observatory

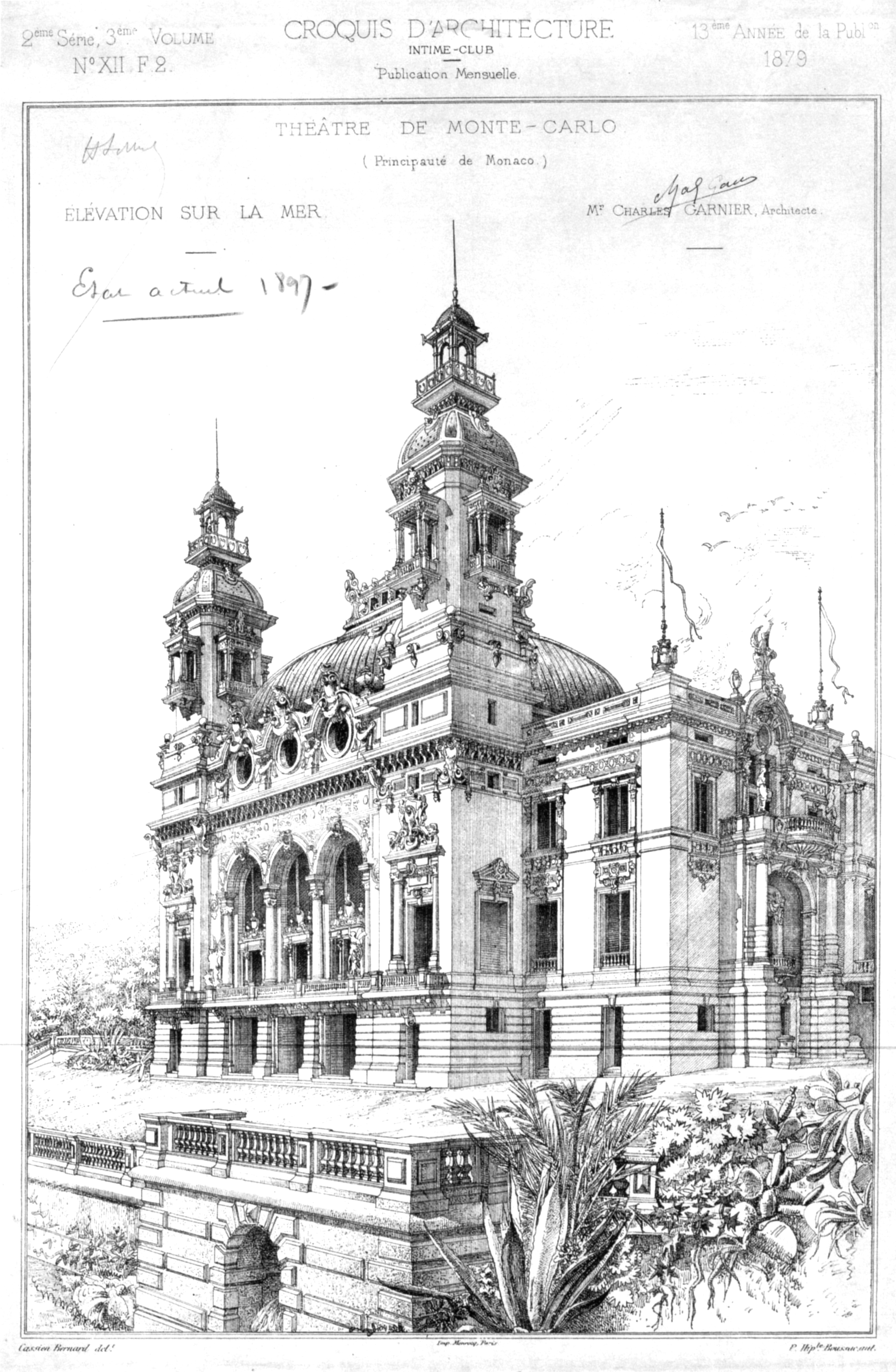
Monte Carlo Concert Hall, facade

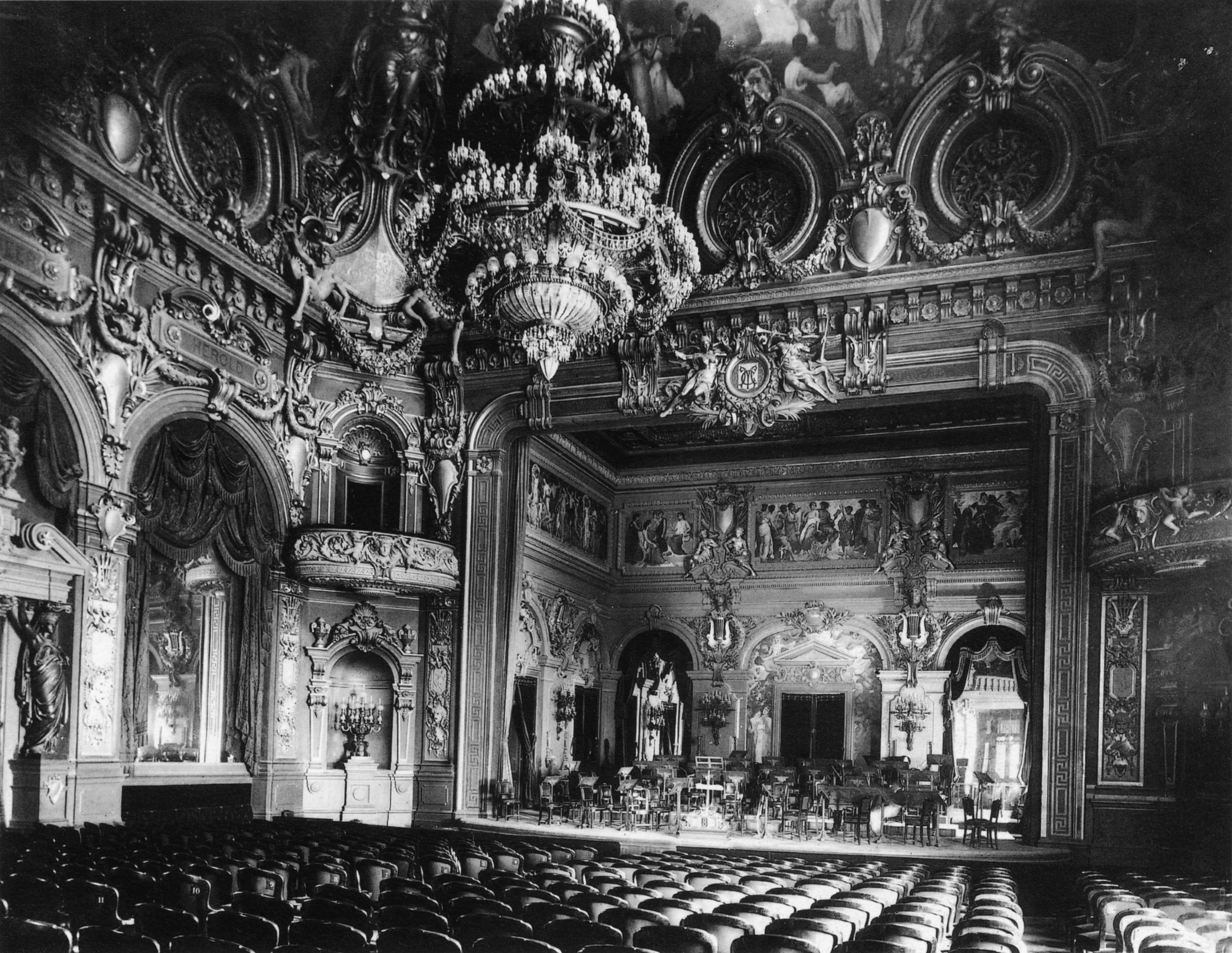
Monte Carlo Concert Hall, interior

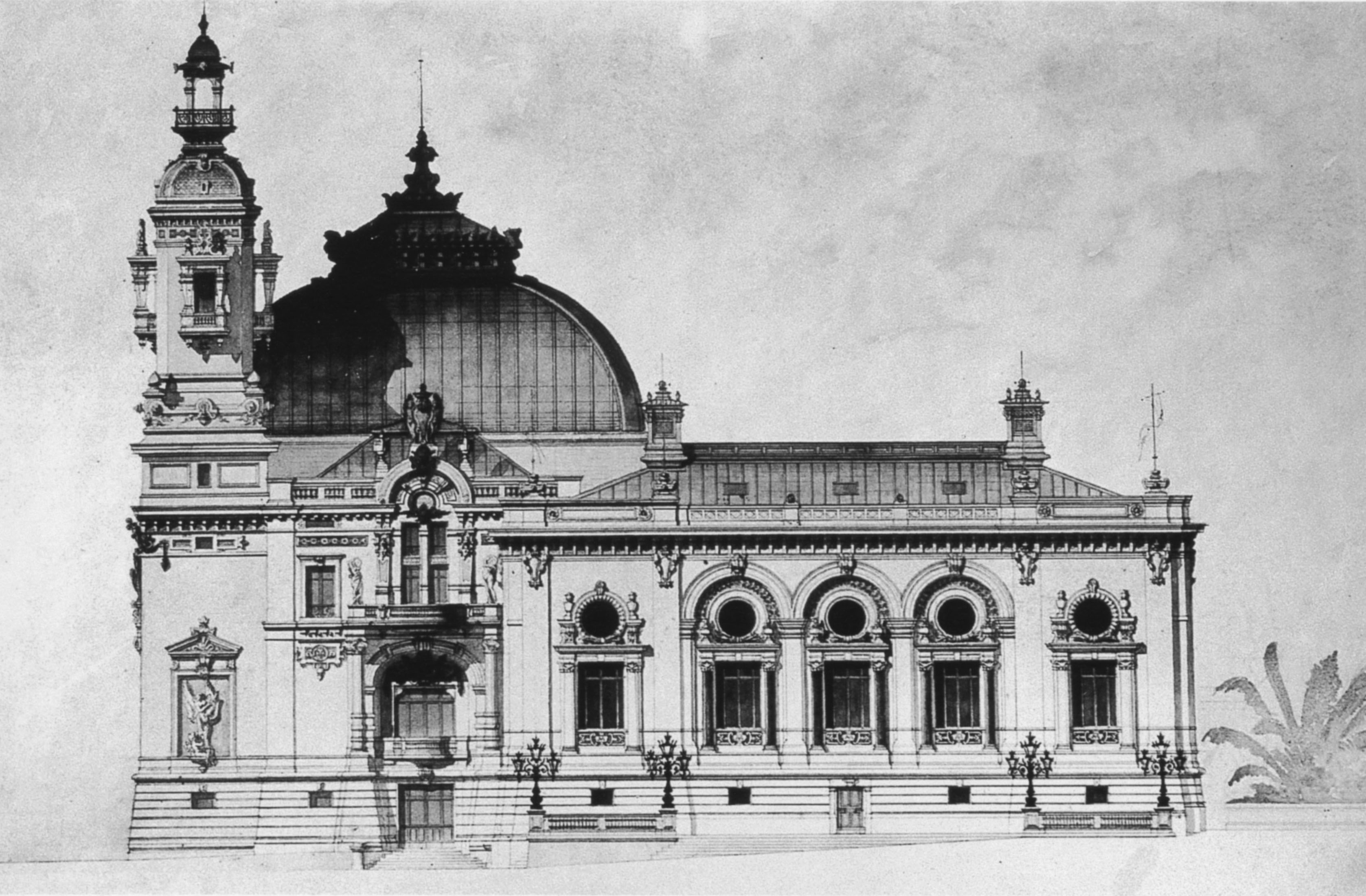
Trente-et-Quarante Gaming Room, Monte Carlo

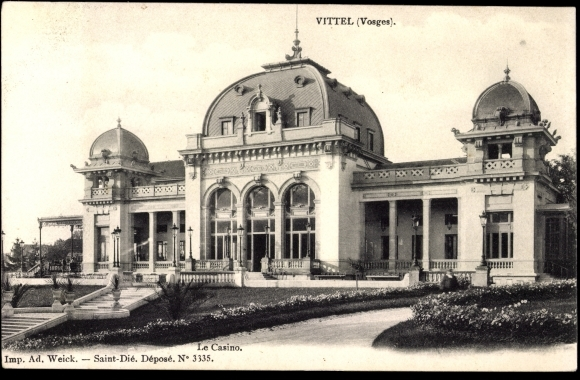
Vittel Casino

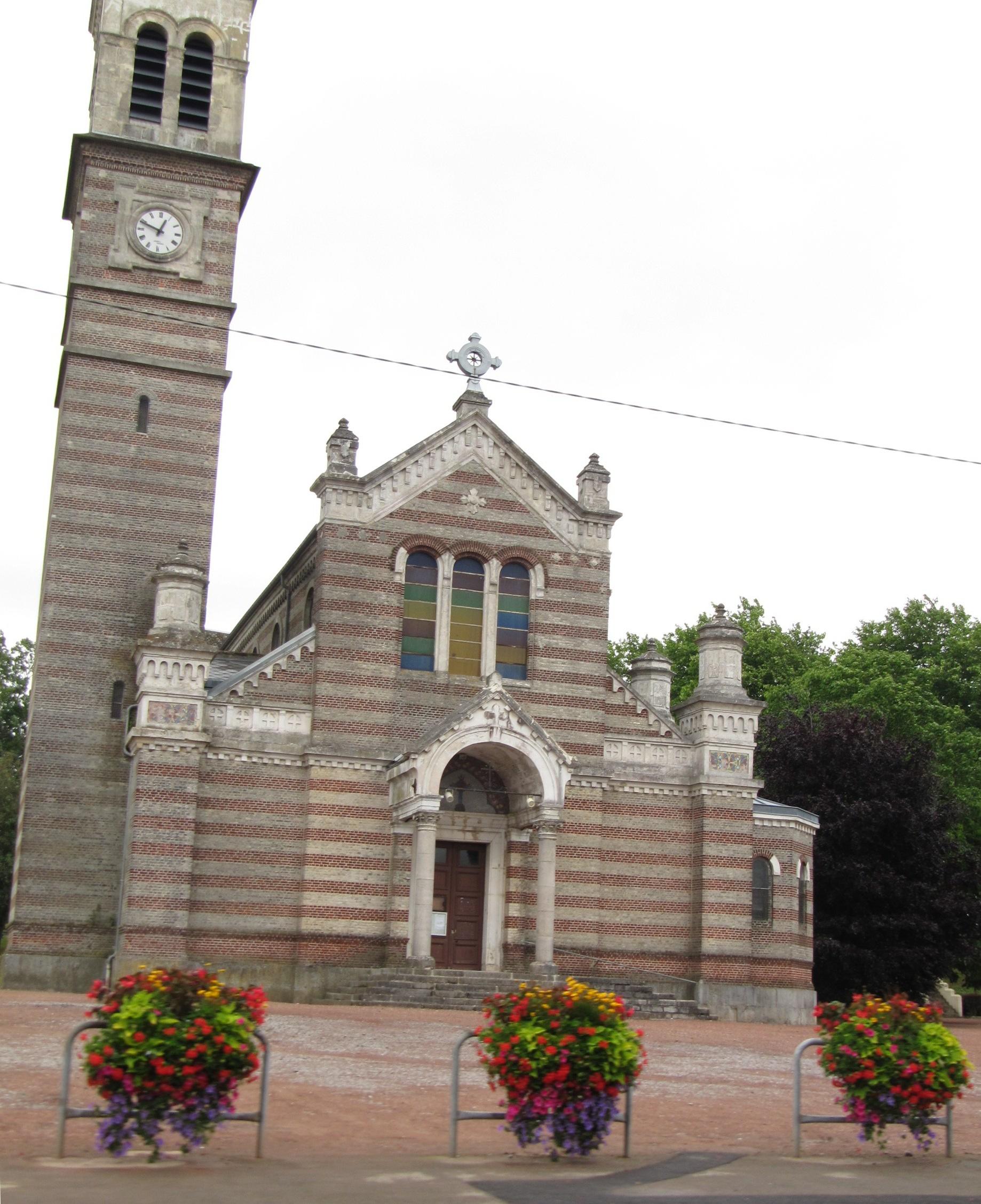
Church of La Capelle

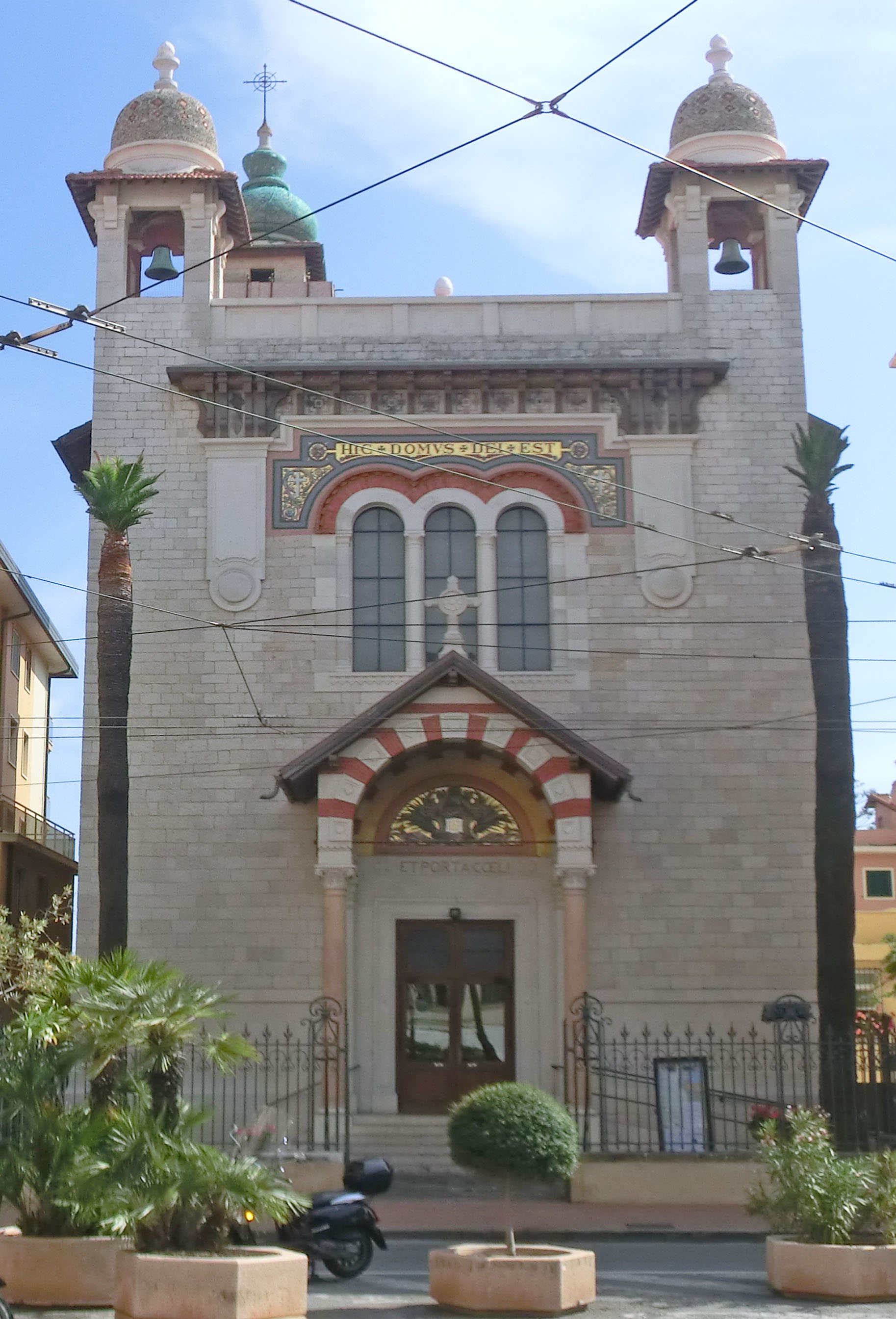
Terrasanta Church, Bordighera

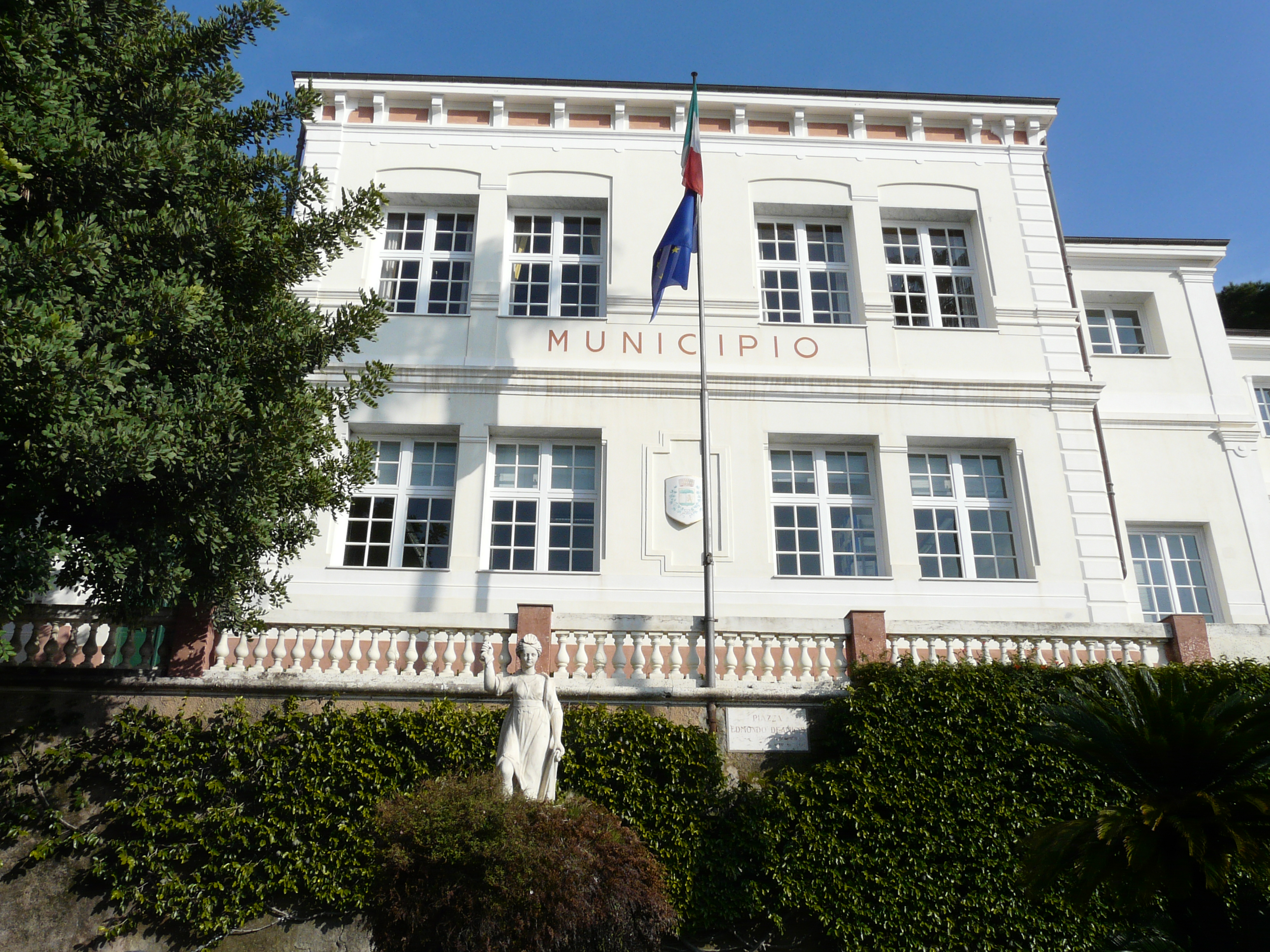
Town Hall, Bordighera

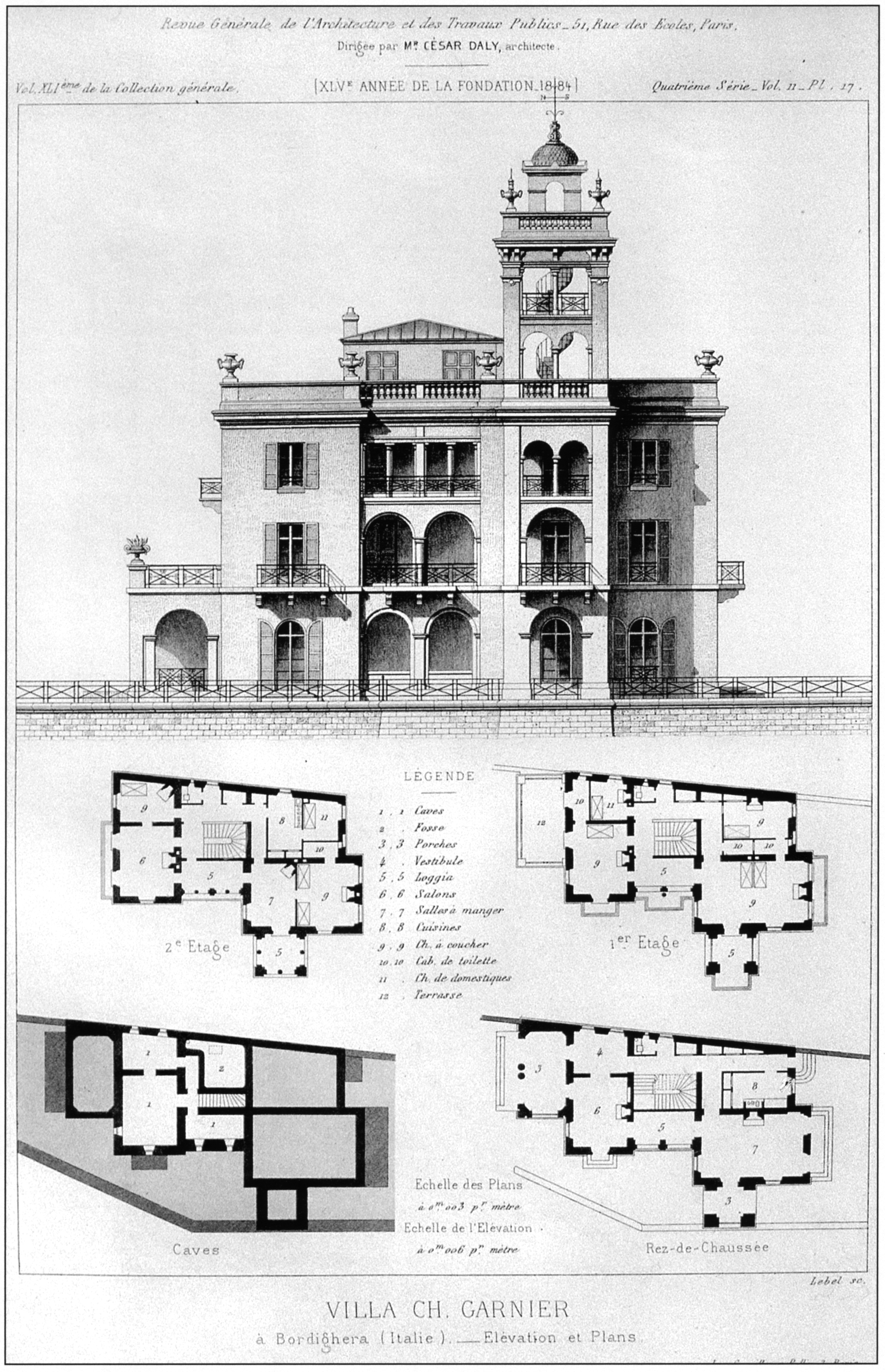
Villa Garnier, Bordighera

Spain Palacio Recreo de las cadenas, Fundación Real Escuela Andaluza de Arte Ecuestre. Jerez de la Frontera (Cádiz)

== Quotations ==
- In 1851 alors qu'il est pensionnaire à la Villa Médicis à Rome et à l'occasion d'un voyage à Athens, Garnier s'exclame en découvrant le Parthenon : "Il n'y a pas à choisir entre les arts, il faut être Dieu ou architecte."
- "Les ingénieurs ont de fréquentes occasions d'employer le fer en grandes parties, et c'est sur cette matière que plus d'un fonde l'espoir d'une architecture nouvelle. Je lui dis tout de suite, c'est là une erreur. Le fer est un moyen, ce ne sera jamais un principe."

== See also ==
- Napoleon III style

== Bibliography ==
- Ayers, Andrew (2004). The Architecture of Paris. Stuttgart; London: Edition Axel Menges. ISBN 978-3-930698-96-7.
- Bonillo, Jean-Lucien, et al. (2004). Charles Garnier and Gustave Eiffel on the French and Italian Rivieras: The Dream of Reason (in English and French). Marseilles: Editions Imbernon. ISBN 9782951639614.
- Bouvier, Béatrice (2004). "Inventaires" in Bonillo et al. 2004, pp. 186–205.
- Bouvier, Béatrice (2003). "Catalogue" in Leniaud 2003, pp. 160 165.
- Ducher, Robert (1988), Caractéristique des Styles, Paris: Flammarion, ISBN 2-08-011539-1
- Kirkland, Stephane (2013). Paris Reborn: Napoléon III, Baron Haussmann, and the Quest to Build a Modern City. New York: St Martin's Press. ISBN 9780312626891.
- Leniaud, Jean-Michel (2003). Charles Garnier. Paris: Monum, Éditions du patrimoine. ISBN 9782858227051.
- Mead, Christopher Curtis (1991). Charles Garnier's Paris Opéra: Architectural Empathy and the Renaissance of French Classicism. New York: The Architectural History Foundation. Cambridge, Massachusetts: The MIT Press. ISBN 9780262132756.
- Savorra, Massimiliano (2003). Itinerari italiani di formazione. Charles Garnier a Venezia, in « Casabella », no. 709, mars 2003, p. 74-85
- Savorra, Massimiliano (2003), Charles Garnier in Italia. Un viaggio attraverso le arti. 1848-1854, (pref. Pierre Pinon), Il Poligrafo, Padova 2003 scheda libro
- Savorra, Massimiliano (2005). Tra attese e scoperte: la Toscana di Charles Garnier, in G. Orefice (a cura di), Architetti in viaggio: suggestioni e immagini, numero monografico di «Storia dell’urbanistica Toscana», n. XI, 2005, p. 86-92
- Savorra, Massimiliano (2010). Una lezione da Parigi al mondo. Il teatro di Charles Garnier, in L. Mozzoni, S. Santini (a cura di), L’architettura dell’eclettismo. Il teatro. Architettura, tecniche teatrali e pubblico, Liguori, Napoli 2010, p. 61-133
