= Sabina Vela-Dragoni =

Italian wife of sculptor Vincenzo Vela

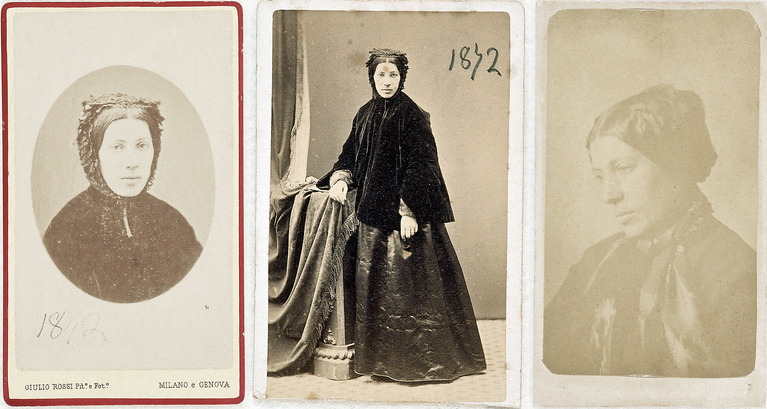
- Born: 1 September 1822; Corpi Santi di Milano, Papal States
- Died: 30 October 1892 (aged 70); Ligornetto, Ticino, Switzerland
- Known for: Management of sculptor Vincenzo Vela's artistic career and collection
- Spouse: Vincenzo Vela
- Children: Spartaco Vela

Sabina Vela-Dragoni (1 September 1822 – 30 October 1892) was an Italian woman best known as the wife of sculptor Vincenzo Vela and for her central role in managing his artistic activities and legacy.

== Early life ==
Cornelia Sabina Dragoni was born in the Beveradora farmhouse in the territory of Corpi Santi di Milano, the youngest of seven children of Angelo Dragoni, an accountant, and Livia Acerbi. At the time, her father was the farmer of the Beveradora and Benzona estates belonging to the Luoghi pii elemosinieri of Milan, an institution for poor relief. Several years earlier, he had come into contact with Baron Bartolomeo Pergami della Franchina—a favored associate of Caroline of Brunswick—whom he later followed as an agent during his travels throughout the Italian peninsula. As administrators of lands and agricultural estates with substantial cultural backgrounds, the Dragoni family were among the members of the emerging bourgeoisie. Sabina Dragoni grew up in a nonconformist and politically engaged environment: her father openly professed republican faith, and her brothers Bruto and Regolo fought on the front lines during the battles for Italian independence.

== Marriage and artistic partnership ==
According to Romeo Manzoni, author of one of the first monographs on Vincenzo Vela, Sabina Dragoni met the artist in the Milan workshop of his master Benedetto Cacciatori, where she posed as a model. This encounter, in the 1840s, led to a relationship that strengthened over the years, facilitated by shared ideals of the Risorgimento and their common desire for Lombardy's independence from Austrian rule. When Vela decided to settle in Turin in 1853, following his refusal of an honorary position as an artist member of the Brera Academy—which resulted in his expulsion from Lombardy and a brief stay in Ticino—Sabina Dragoni joined him and settled with him in the Vanchiglia district. They married on 21 February 1853. Their only son, Spartaco Vela, was born the following year. Lorenzo Vela, a specialist in ornamental sculpture, was Sabina's brother-in-law.

== Professional role and later life ==
From this time onward, Sabina Vela-Dragoni became an increasingly important point of reference for Vela, not only in private life but also professionally, often managing his relationships with patrons and suppliers and writing many of the letters sent by the sculptor to his friends and acquaintances. She retained this role as a guiding figure even after Vela decided to return to his native Ligornetto in 1867, where he had built an imposing studio-house that quickly became a center of attraction for artists, collectors, and admirers of his work. Around 1880, she compiled with her son an early manuscript guide to the collection at the Vincenzo Vela Museum. She was also responsible for reorganizing, initially conserving, and selecting her husband's correspondence, contributions that were crucial to his artistic career and to the construction of his public image. According to a recent study of the Vela family library, Sabina Vela-Dragoni appears as a cultivated reader. She died on 30 October 1892 in the residence and private museum of Ligornetto, just over a year after her husband's death.

== Bibliography ==
- Manzoni, Romeo: Vincenzo Véla. L'homme, le patriote, l'artiste, 1906 (reprint 1995)
- Scott, Nancy Jane: Vincenzo Vela 1820–1891, 1979
- Montanari, Luigi: Garibaldi a Ravenna nel 1849, 1982
- Bianchi, Stefania; Mena, Fabrizio: "Le passioni, le amicizie e la quotidianità nella biblioteca dello scultore", in: Mina, Gianna A. (ed.): Pagine che parlano. La vita e l'arte di Vincenzo Vela raccontate dai suoi libri, 2021, pp. 11–66
