= Museo Vincenzo Vela =

Biographical art museum in Switzerland

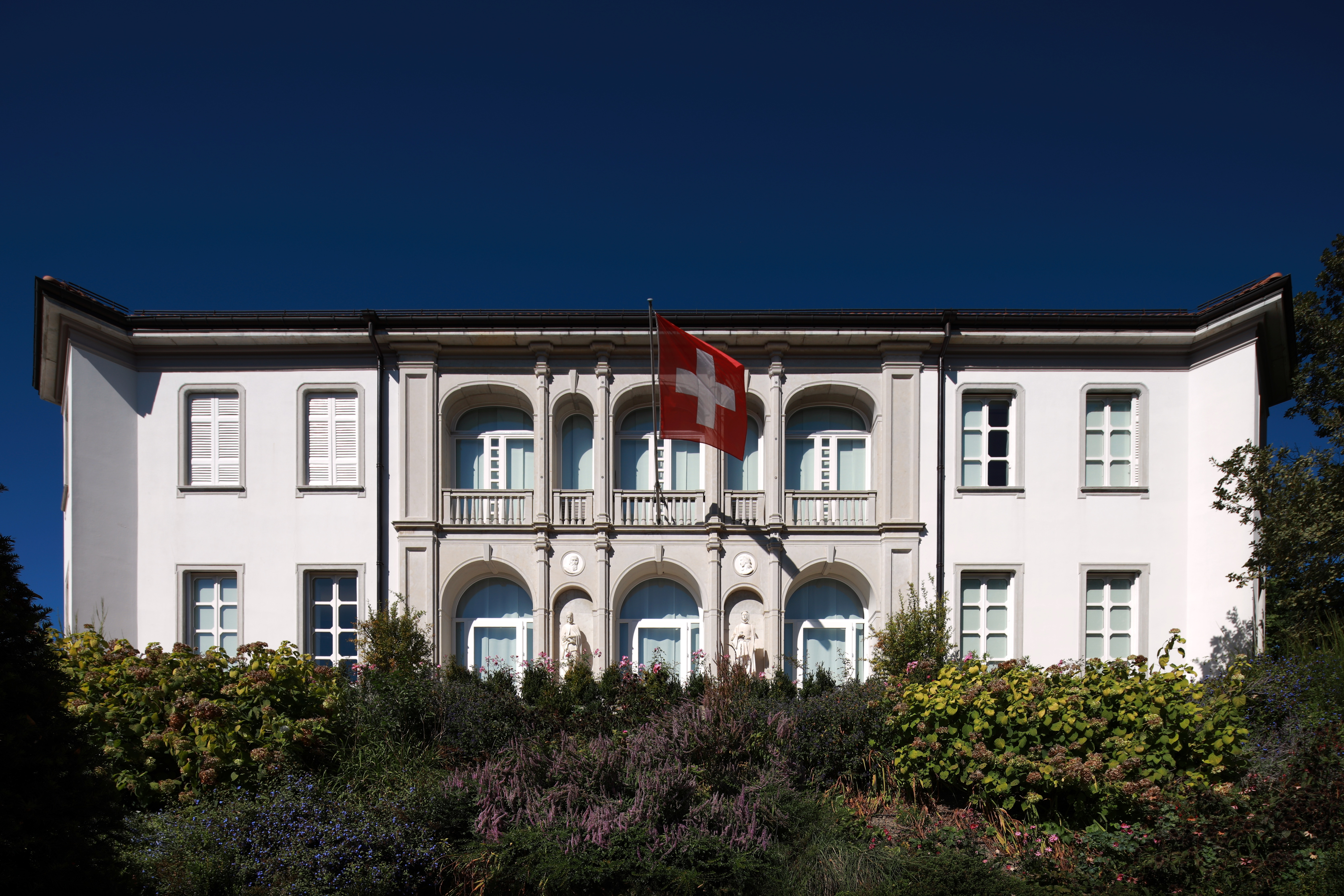
- Museo Vincenzo Vela
- Established: 26 September 1898
- Location: Via Lorenzo Vela 6, Ligornetto, Ticino, Switzerland
- Type: Artist museum
- Visitors: 4,958 (2023)
- Director: Antonia Nessi
- Architect: Cipriano Ajmetti; Isidoro Spinelli; Mario Botta (renovation)
- Website: museo-vela.ch

The Museo Vincenzo Vela is an artist museum in Ligornetto, a village in the municipality of Mendrisio in the Swiss canton of Ticino.

Dedicated primarily to the work of the sculptor Vincenzo Vela, it occupies the villa he built on a hillside above his native village. The museum preserves one of Europe's most substantial collections of nineteenth-century sculptural models and was the first public museum in Ticino. It is listed as a cultural property of national significance in the Swiss Inventory of Cultural Property.

== History ==
=== Inception and construction ===
During the 1840s and 1850s, Vincenzo Vela achieved notable success in Lombardy and Piedmont. At the height of his career he returned to Ticino in 1867 and had a villa built overlooking Ligornetto. The original design by Cipriano Ajmetti was conceived as a country residence, but Vela soon decided to settle permanently in Switzerland and unite under one roof his plaster models and family collections. The plans were therefore substantially revised by Ajmetti together with Vela, and later refined by the Locarno architect Isidoro Spinelli, who directed construction from 1862. Although the building drew inspiration from Milanese summer villas, its triple function as residence, studio, and museum was unusual for its time.

=== Private museum ===
The villa opened informally to visitors from 1868. Its growing success led, in 1881, to the construction of a chalet-style house for a custodian by architect Augusto Guidini. Around 1880, Vela’s wife Sabina Vela-Dragoni and their son Spartaco Vela compiled a manuscript catalogue of the works, effectively establishing the villa as a private museum.

After Vela’s death in 1891, the villa passed to Spartaco, who in 1892 drafted a testament bequeathing the property and its collections to the Swiss Confederation. The Confederation accepted the gift in 1896 under the conditions that nothing be sold or removed and that the house remain accessible to the public, either as a museum or a school “for the common good.” The bequest also included the inventory of Vela’s Milan atelier and 10,000 francs for furnishing the rooms. The museum was inaugurated in 1898, one year after the death of Vincenzo’s elder brother Lorenzo Vela, whose donation further expanded the plaster collection.

=== Development as national institution ===
The museum’s visibility declined with the waning of realism, and interior renovations in 1913 and 1960–1961 removed most traces of the villa’s domestic character and its original display. Renewed interest in Vela beginning in the 1970s prompted the Federal Office of Culture to strengthen and modernize the museum in 1978 and again between 1983 and 1987. The most extensive renovation, led by architect Mario Botta, was carried out from 1997 to 2001. This project reinstated the original layout of the permanent exhibition, especially in the central octagonal hall, where major works are grouped thematically to highlight both the artistic quality of Vela’s sculptures and the creative processes behind them.

== Collections ==
The museum preserves around 5,000 works from the estates of Vincenzo, Spartaco, and Lorenzo Vela. These include plaster models, terracotta and plaster bozzetti representing nearly all of Vincenzo Vela’s sculptural output, and some of his marble works. Pieces by Lorenzo Vela and donations from students and assistants were added over time, although expanding the collection is not part of the museum’s mandate.

The villa also houses the family’s art collections, including a painting gallery and a significant group of nineteenth-century photographs. These collections present a panorama of northern Italian art from the 1850s to the 1880s, featuring works by painters of the Risorgimento such as Leone Eydoux, Girolamo Induno, Domenico Induno, and Eleuterio Pagliano, as well as by Giovanni Segantini and other younger artists.

== Building and park ==
The villa’s park was integral to the original conception of the site, although the identity of the landscape architect engaged by Vela is not known. The tripartite layout has largely been preserved and is part of the Grandi giardini italiani network. Following landscaping work in 2011, particular emphasis has been placed on biodiversity. The large terraced lawn is used for open-air displays and cultural events.

== Contemporary role ==
The museum serves as a centre for research on Vincenzo, Lorenzo, and Spartaco Vela and maintains a specialized library. Since 2001, its activities have followed a coherent curatorial programme, with exhibitions accompanied by multilingual scholarly catalogues and a focus on nineteenth-century and contemporary sculpture as well as historical photography. Its mediation programmes address a wide range of audiences. From 2004, the museum was among the first Swiss cultural institutions to include migrants, asylum seekers, people with disabilities, and people with dementia in its initiatives. In 2019, it became the first museum in Ticino to receive the “Culture inclusive” label from Pro Infirmis.

== Bibliography ==
- Canavesio, Walter: “L'edificio (dal 1862 al 1919)”, in: Mina, Gianna A.: Museo Vela, le collezioni. Scultura, pittura, grafica, fotografia, 2002, pp. 25–35.
- Celio, Cornelia: La casa museo di Vincenzo Vela a Ligornetto, master's thesis, Università degli Studi di Firenze, 1995.
- Celio Binaghi, Cornelia; Gubler, Jacques et al.: “Il Museo Vela a Ligornetto”, in: Archi. Rivista svizzera di architettura, ingegneria e urbanistica, 2002/3, pp. 10–23.
- Mina, Gianna A. (ed.): Casa d'artisti. Quaderni del Museo Vela, 1997–.
- Mina, Gianna A.: “L'atelier dell'artista come opera d'arte. La casa-museo Vincenzo Vela a Ligornetto”, in: Guderzo, Mario (ed.): Gli ateliers degli scultori, 2010, pp. 249–259.
- Mina, Gianna A.: “La casa e l'atelier dell'artista. Un autoritratto 'a futura memoria'”, in: Art + architecture en Suisse, 66/1, 2015, pp. 12–15.
- Mina, Gianna A. (ed.): Pagine che parlano, 2021.
- Wasmer, Marc-Joachim: Museo Vincenzo Vela a Ligornetto, Guides d'art et d'histoire de la Suisse, 1070, 2020.
