= Lelli =

Lelli is an Italian surname. Notable people with the surname include:

- Ercole Lelli (1702–1766), Italian painter
- Giovan Battista Lelli (1828–1898), Italian painter
- Giovanni Antonio Lelli (1591–1640), Italian painter
- Larry Lelli, American musician
- Massimiliano Lelli (born 1967), Italian cyclist
- Teodoro de Lellis or Teodoro Lelli (died 1466), Roman Catholic prelate who served as Bishop of Treviso
