= Vincenzo Vela =

Swiss-Italian sculptor

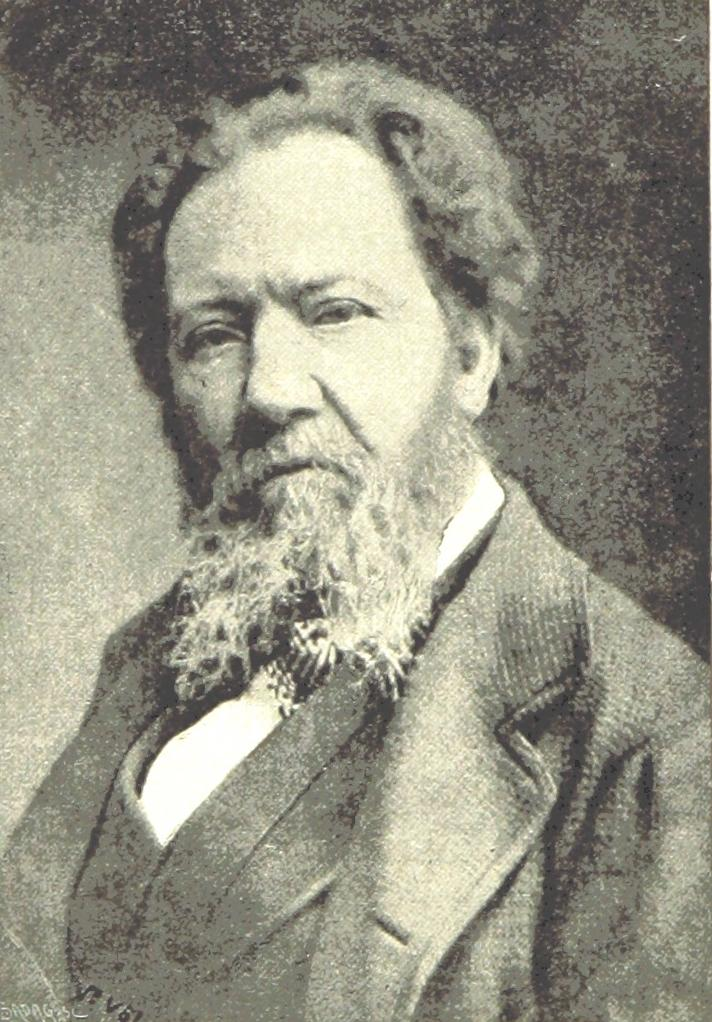
Vincenzo Vela

Vincenzo Vela (May 3, 1820 - October 3, 1891) was a Swiss-Italian sculptor, active mainly in northern Italy.

== Biography ==
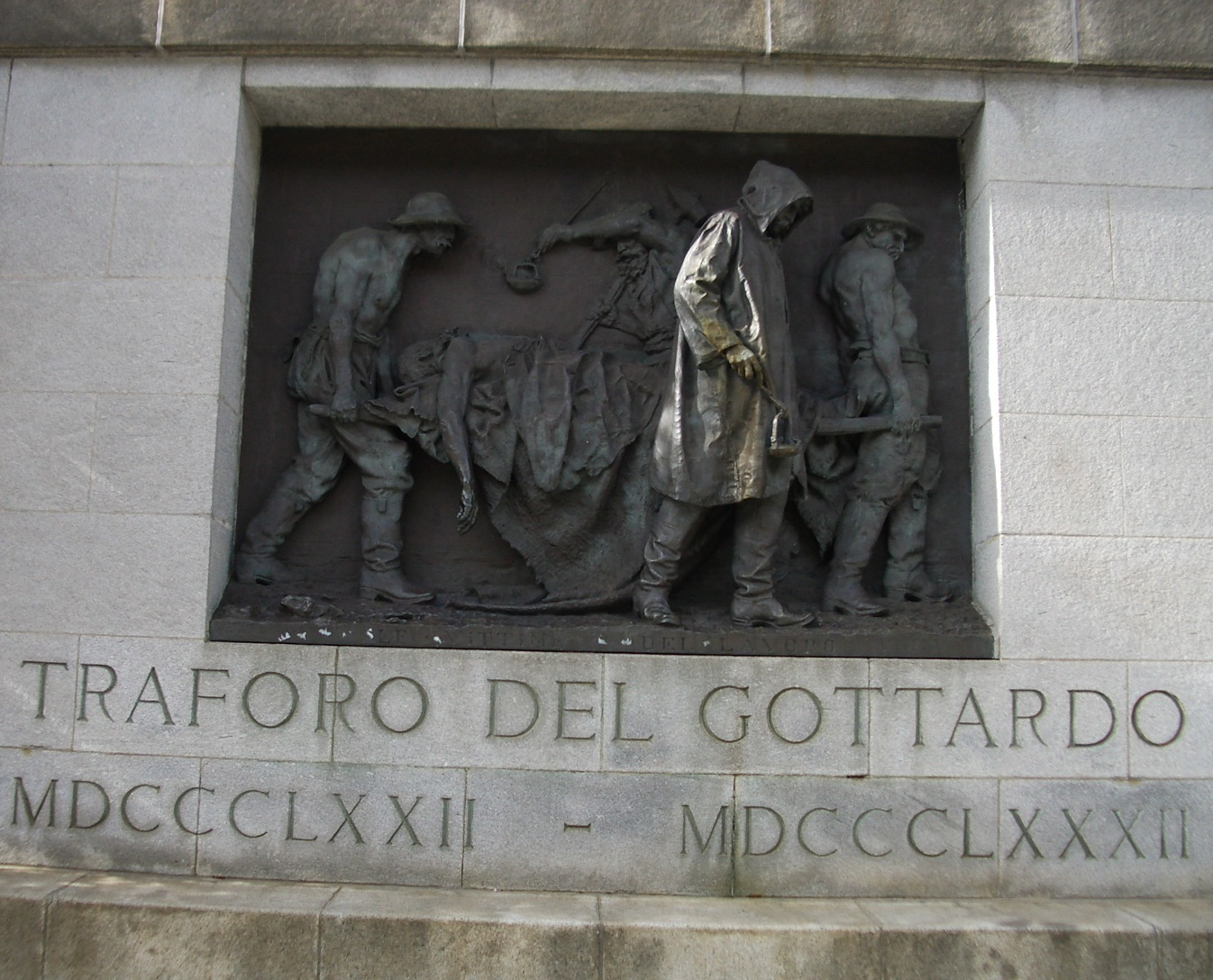
Monument to dead workers at Gotthard Rail Tunnel

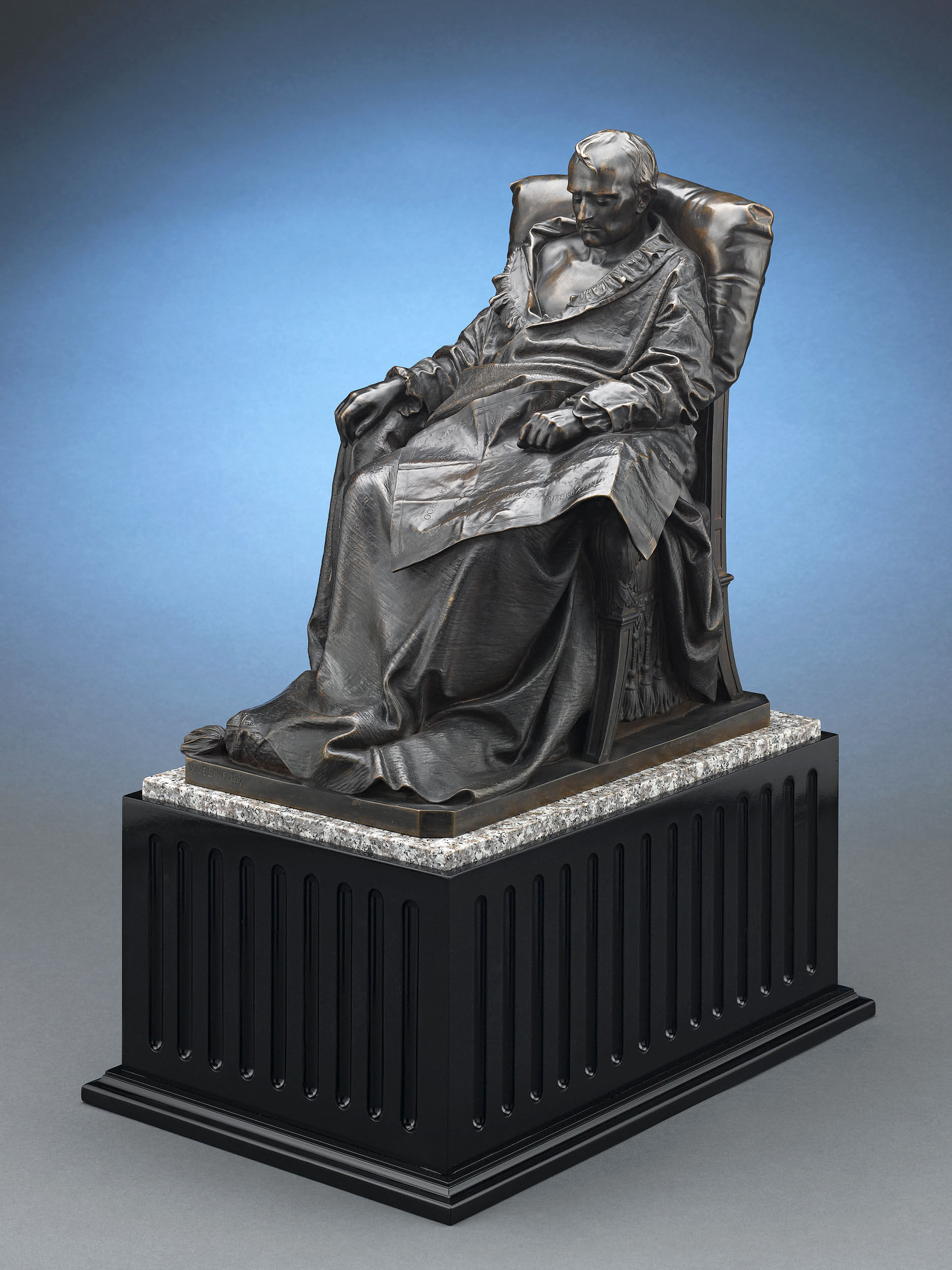
Last Days of Napoleon by Vincenzo Vela. Circa 1867. Bronze on marble and wood base

Vela was born in Ligornetto in the canton of Ticino to parents of little means. Having started work as boy as a stonecutter at mines of Besazio, Vela received his initial training at Viggiù and then moved to Milan, where he worked on the Cathedral and enrolled at the Brera Academy of Fine Arts in 1832. In Milan, he worked under Professor Cacciatori.

The influence of Lorenzo Bartolini’s work led to the adoption of a naturalistic approach and the early 1840s saw a number of figures in contemporary dress in obvious contrast to the classical approach still dominant in sculpture. Francesco Hayez played an active part in securing prestigious commissions for him from the liberal aristocracy and bourgeoisie of Lombardy, above all for works of a patriotic nature alluding to the Italian political situation. After a short stay in Rome, he enlisted in 1848 to serve as a volunteer in the first war of independence. He then moved to Turin, where he held the chair in sculpture at the Albertina Academy, in 1852. His repertoire of funerary monuments, portraits and public works drawing inspiration from the struggle for national liberation proved a great success also in France, where his work dedicated to the last days of Napoleon’s life won a prize at the Paris Universal Exhibition of 1867 and ensured his renown. He returned to Ligornetto in the same year and took up residence in the villa built to house the works from his studios in Turin. His mature production is characterised by a repertoire of portraits and funerary monuments, and includes a naturalistic relief dedicated to the 199 workers killed during the construction of the Gotthard Rail Tunnel (1882–83).

His first piece winning an award at a contest at the Brera was a bas-relief depicting the Return of Ulysses to Ithaca. He then won in a Venetian competition (gold medal and 60 zecchini) from among submissions from Northern Italy with a model for a sculpture depicting Christ resurrects that daughter of Jair.

With this award he traveled to Rome, to study and work. Vela returned to Milan to fight in the wars of the Italians against Austria. Once the rebellion was staunched, Vela completed the marble statue of Spartacus breaking his Chains; the resonance of the theme would not have been lost on Italian patriots. Vela refused the offer by the Austrian authorities to join the Academy of Fine Arts of Milan. He was imprisoned for his political views, and exiled to his hometown in Switzerland. There he began work on his statue of the carabiniere Francesco Cartoni, killed by the Austrians at Sommacampagna, and a statue of William Tell for Lugano.

In 1852, he accepted a professorship at the Accademia Albertina of Turin. There he completed Rassegnazione, for the Contessa Loschi of Vicenza; a statue for the mathematician Piola; a statue of the poet Tommaso Grossi, one of the philosopher Rosmini; a Minerva for Lisbon; a statue of Count Cavour for the atrium of the Bourse in Genoa; a Monument to Donizetti with an allegorical female representing Harmony crying beside the portrait of great master. His statue of Hope was for the funereal monument of the Prever Family of Turin; his Cesare Balbo, for the public gardens of Turin; he made two statues of the two queens Maria Adelaide and Maria Teresa; Primavera, for the Bottàccini family of Trieste; L'Alfiere combattente, standing before the palazzo Madama in Turin. He completes a Monument to Manin in Turin. Vela completed a Vittorio Emanuele, for the Palazzo Civico of Turin; a Carlo Alberto, for the Royal Palace; a statue of Joachim Murat, For the camposanto of the Certosa in Bologna he completed: statues of Dante and Giotto for Prato della Valle in Padoa; and la Pregante. At the French Exposition of 1863, Vela exhibited: L' Italia riconoscente alla Francia, donated by Milan to empress Eugenia. She also commissioned a statue of Christopher Columbus in bronze for Vera Cruz, Mexico.

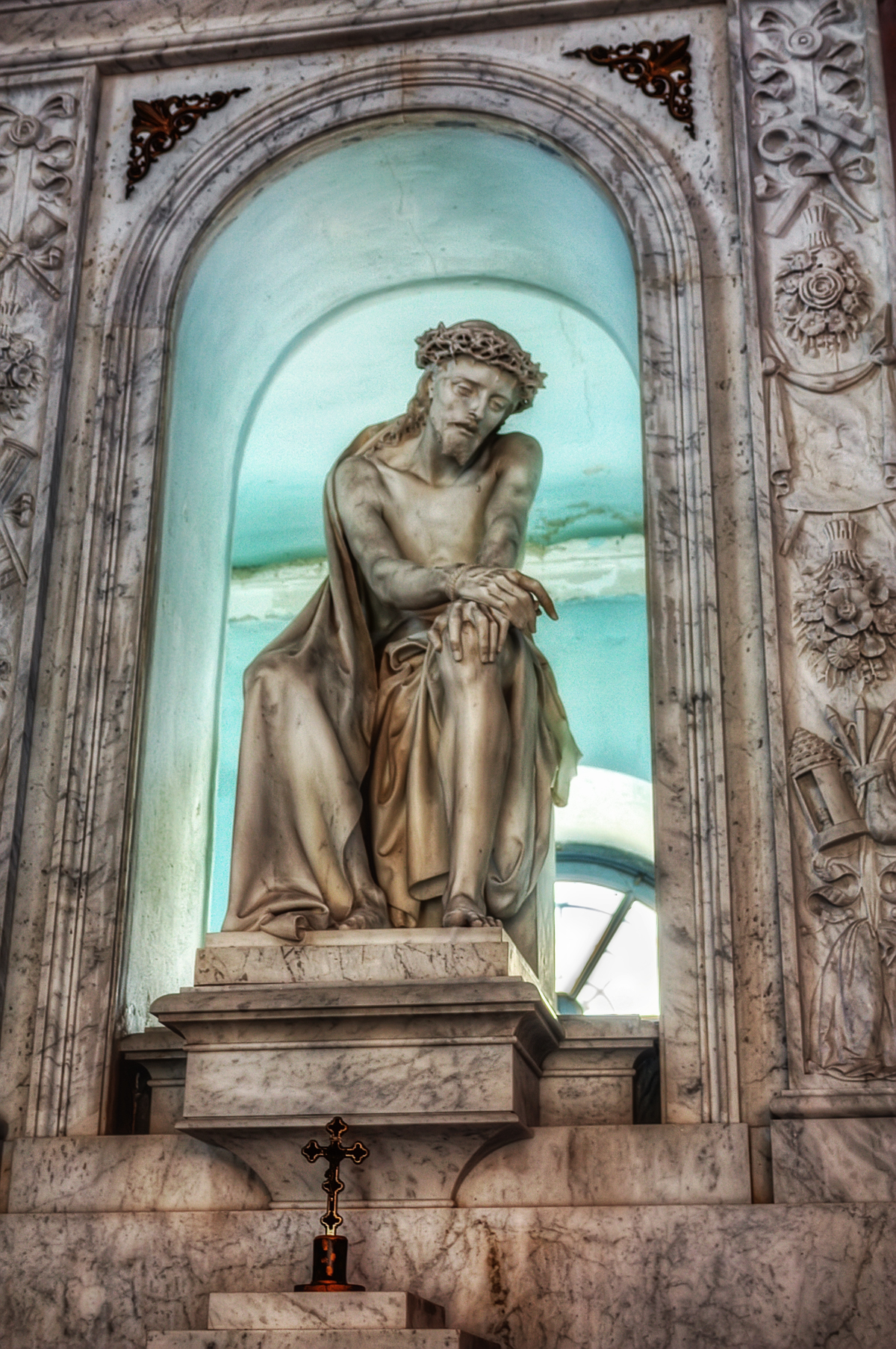
Ecce Homo, Vincenzo Vela

He exhibited an Ecce Homo in Rome in 1883, and it was reviewed in L'Illustrazione Italiana:

There is no question about Vela...His Ecco Homo, beautifully cast in bronze by Barzaghi, is one of the most admired statues at the Exhibition...the rhythm of the lines, the well-modelled limbs, the hands not glossed over but refined, the feet made by someone who knows how to overcome even the secondary but no less arduous difficulties of sculpture. The figure—although seated in the act of expressing, in the Christ beaten with rods, stripped and mocked, the just man trampled by human wickedness—is dignified. In the folds that fall from his shoulders to the ground, partly covering him, one recognises the master who sustains the traditions of the ancient.

== Museo Vincenzo Vela ==
His son, Spartaco Vela (1853-1895), was a landscape painter who trained at the Brera Academy. Spartaco willed the house and works in his father's studio to the Swiss government for the establishment of a museum: Museo Vincenzo Vela in Ligornetto. The house designed by the architect Cipriano Ajmetti, was restructured in 2001 by architect Mario Botta, and displays the works of the sculptor in a novel setting. The museum displays some of Spartaco's paintings and sculptures of his uncle Lorenzo Vela.

The museum also contains contemporary paintings collected by the three Velas. Those of Lorenzo, include works of Ambrogio Preda (1839-1906), Luigi Scrosati (1814-1869), Giuseppe Landriani (1824-1894), Eleuterio Pagliano (1826-1903), Bartolomeo Giuliano (1825-1909), Federico Faruffini (1833-1869), and Mosé Bianchi (1840-1904). Those of Spartaco include works from his Milanese circle of painters, including by his friend Giovanni Segantini (1858-1899), Eugenio Spreafico (1856-1919), FiIippo Carcano, Pio Sanquirico (1847-1900), and Franceso Fiocchi (1856-1936). Those works collected by Vincenzo include works by Gaetano Fasanotti (1831-1882), Ernesto Allason (1822-1869), Leone Eydoux (1829-1875), the brothers Domenico (1815-1878) and Gerolamo Induno (1827-1890), Enrico Gamba (1825-1909), Giuseppe Bertini (1825-1898), and Pierre (Henri Theodore) Tetar van Elven (1828-1908).

== Other projects ==
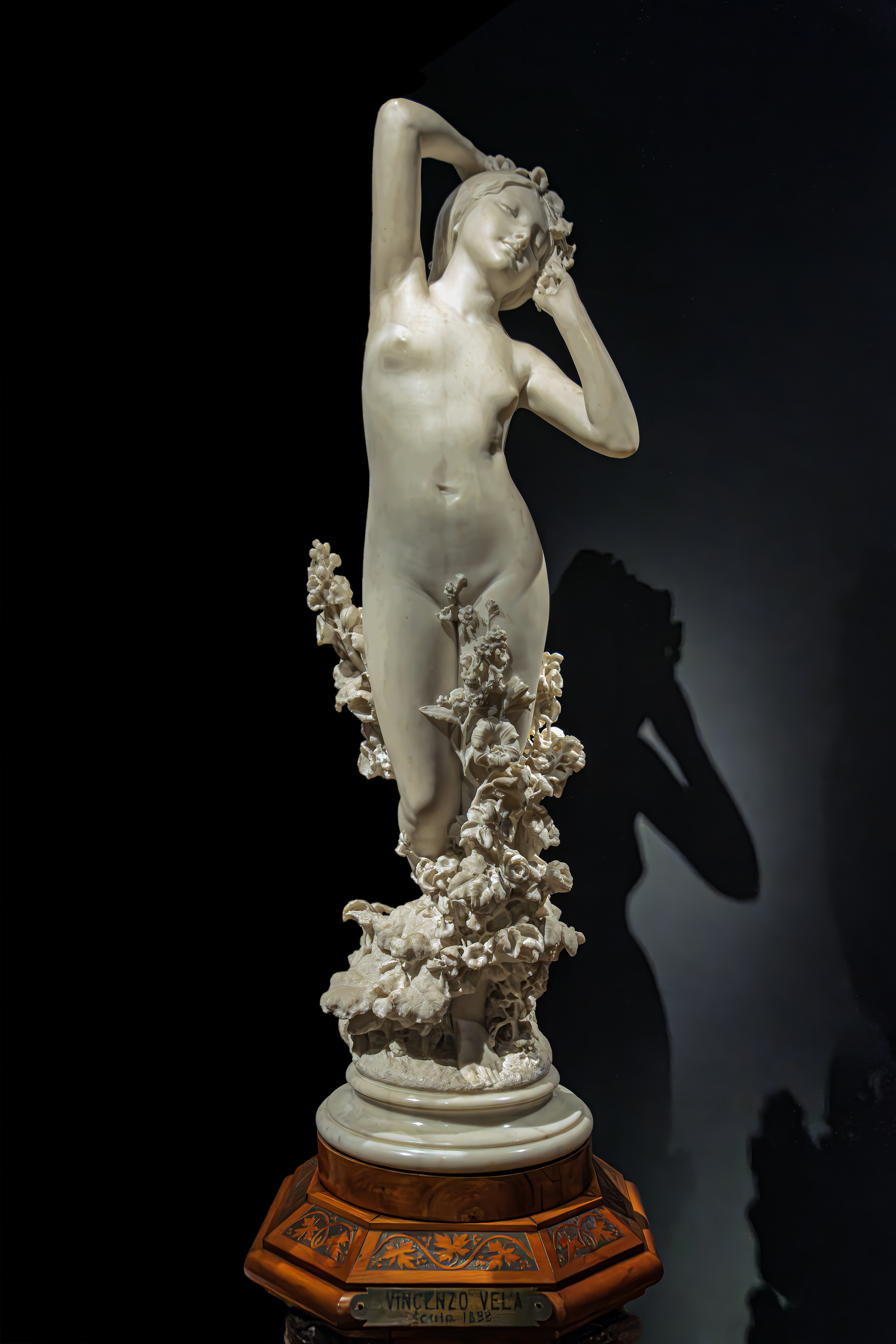
Flora - Museo Bottacin Padua

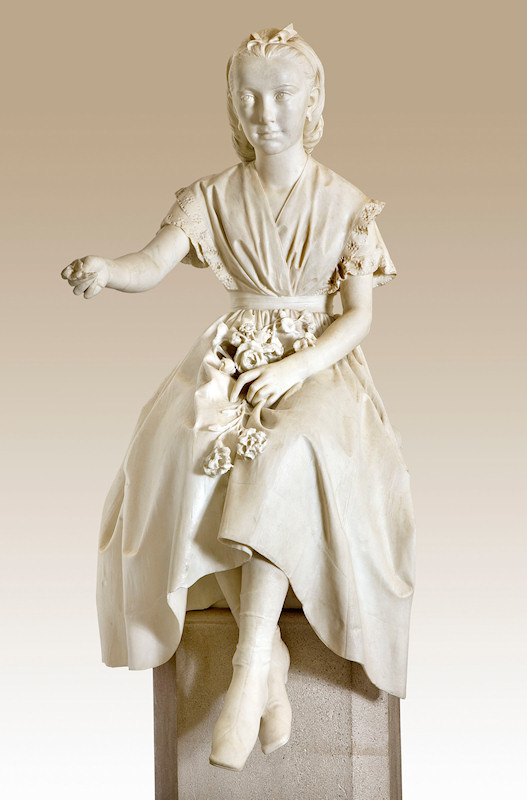
Marchesa Virginia Busti Porro as Adolescent

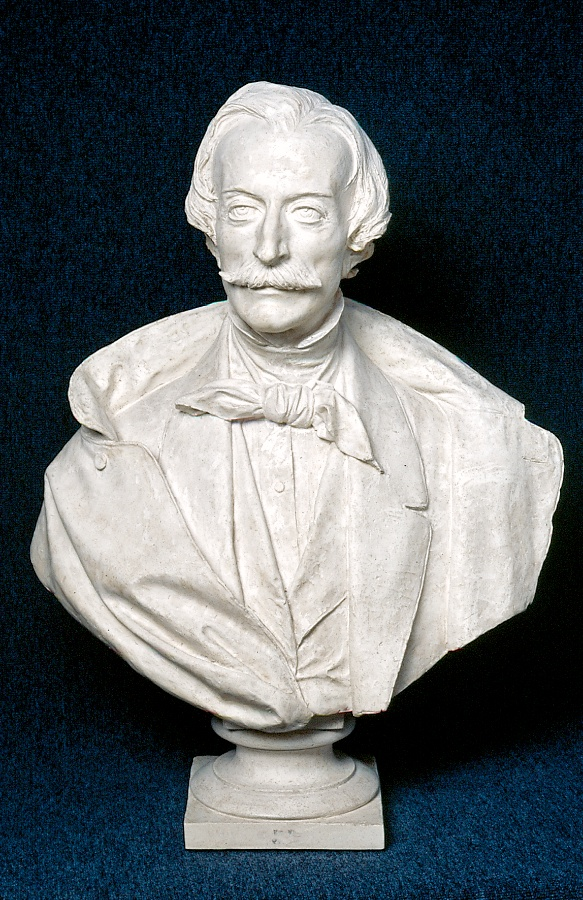
Bust of Massimo D'Azeglio

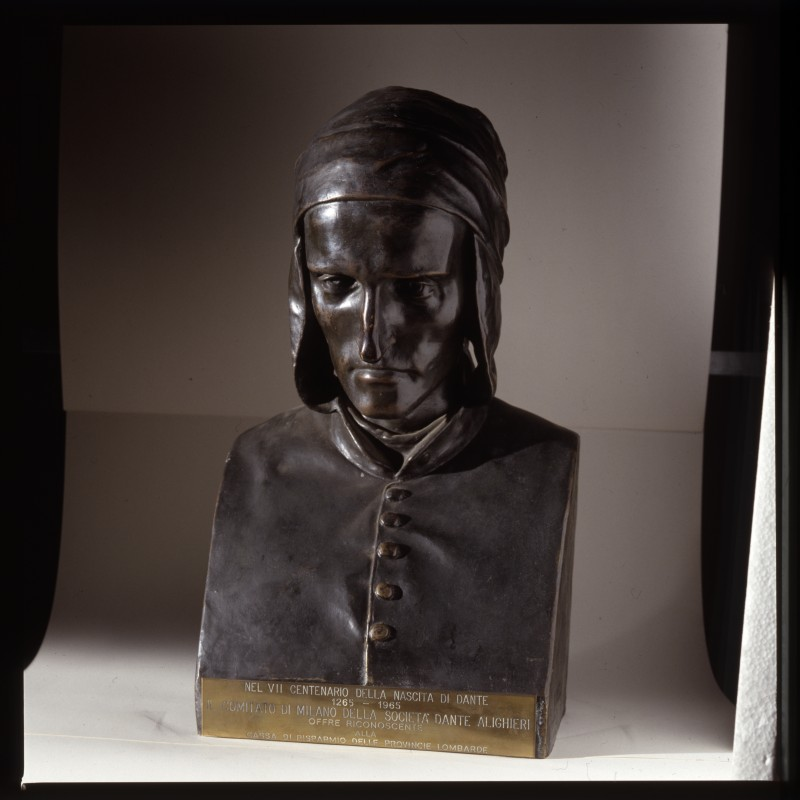
Dante (Fondazione Cariplo)
