= Uberto Dell'Orto =

Italian painter (1848–1895)

Uberto Dell'Orto (January 6, 1848 – November 29, 1895) was an Italian painter, mainly of landscapes.

== Biography ==
He was born and died in Milan. He was initially trained as an engineer, then learned art under Giovanni Battista Lelli and Eleuterio Pagliano. He painted mainly mountain landscapes.
