= Lorenzo Vela =

Swiss sculptor (1812 – 1897)

- Born: July 4, 1812; Ligornetto, Canton Ticino, Switzerland
- Died: January 10, 1897; Milan, Italy
- Occupations: Sculptor, professor
- Known for: Ornamental sculpture

Lorenzo Vela (4 July 1812 – 10 January 1897) was a Swiss-Italian sculptor and ornamental decorator known for his refined decorative work in Milan and his teaching at the Accademia di Brera.

== Early life and training ==
Vela was born in Ligornetto, the fourth of six children of Giuseppe Vela and Teresa Casanova, both farmers and innkeepers. As a child, he trained as a stonemason and marble worker, probably in Viggiù. By the late 1820s, he moved to Milan to pursue his career, following the advice of his older brother Luigi, who worked as a carpenter in the Lombard capital. Among his siblings were his brothers Giovanni Vela, a stonemason in Crema (Austrian citizen from 1853), and Vincenzo Vela, the celebrated sculptor. Vela remained unmarried and had no children.

During his early training, Vela demonstrated considerable aptitude as a decorator and modeler. By working as a decorator for goldsmiths and other sculptors, he was able to finance his studies and later support his brother Vincenzo at the beginning of his career. From 1832 to 1837, he attended the schools of drawing and ornamentation at the Accademia di Brera, where he studied under Ferdinando Albertolli, Francesco Durelli, and Domenico Moglia. He achieved excellent results in decorative modeling, such that an extraordinary prize for ornamental sculpture was created specifically for him in 1835.

== Career ==
=== Decorative work ===
Vela's remarkable technical skills in modeling and creating refined decorative elements, particularly his marble flowers carved with a naturalism unprecedented even in the greatest works of the period, made him a highly valued and well-paid collaborator for many sculptors working in Milan, especially Benedetto Cacciatori. For Cacciatori, Vela executed the ornamental sections of Gesù bambino in un canestro di fiori (1844), which was presented at the Great Exhibition in London (1851) and the Exposition Universelle in Paris (1855).

He produced portraits and small ornamental pieces—primarily with animal subjects in a neo-eighteenth-century style marked by naturalism—which he exhibited regularly at the annual exhibitions of the Accademia di Brera. Vela also worked for clients with more independent and modern tastes, definitively moving away from neoclassical academic models. The counsel and cosmopolitan spirit of architect Giuseppe Balzaretto proved decisive for Vela's career. He collaborated with Balzaretto on several prestigious projects: first as an ornamentalist alongside his brother Vincenzo on the Adda Chapel in Arcore, then as a true associate of Balzaretto and often the painter Luigi Scrosati on the apartments of Palazzo Poldi Pezzoli, Palazzo d'Adda, and Palazzo Dugnani, public gardens, and the Ca' de Sass (new headquarters of the Savings Bank of the Lombard Provinces) in Milan; the gardens and Villa Bordini at Robecco sul Naviglio; and Villa Sioli Legnani at Bussero.

=== Monumental sculpture ===
From the second half of the 1840s onward, Vela undertook more ambitious genre sculptures, such as Putto with a basket of chicks and the peasant girl represented in Hen defending her chicks (1847), both exhibited at the Accademia di Brera. More rarely, he sculpted mythological, historical, and symbolic subjects, such as Hero, The lamp of hope (circa 1850–1860), and Victim of the Inquisition (1860).

=== Academic position ===
Having reached artistic maturity, Vela was appointed assistant professor at the school of ornamentation of the Accademia di Brera in 1860, following the reform of the institution after the annexation of Lombardy to the Kingdom of Sardinia. Until 1891, he taught a course in decorative sculpture at Brera that was highly successful and attended by numerous students, including Giuseppe Grandi. His decorative sculpture work in the ornamental schools of Brera during the mid-nineteenth century represents an important transitional moment between academic ornate traditions and contemporary practice.

== Political activity ==
Vela served as a deputy of the Radical Liberal Party in the Grand Council of Ticino from 1852 to 1867.

== Legacy ==
Vela left to the Swiss Confederation the works preserved in his Milan residence, which complemented the bequest of his nephew Spartaco Vela and now form part of the collections of the Museo Vincenzo Vela in Ligornetto.
