= Clivio =

- Comune
- Comune di Clivio
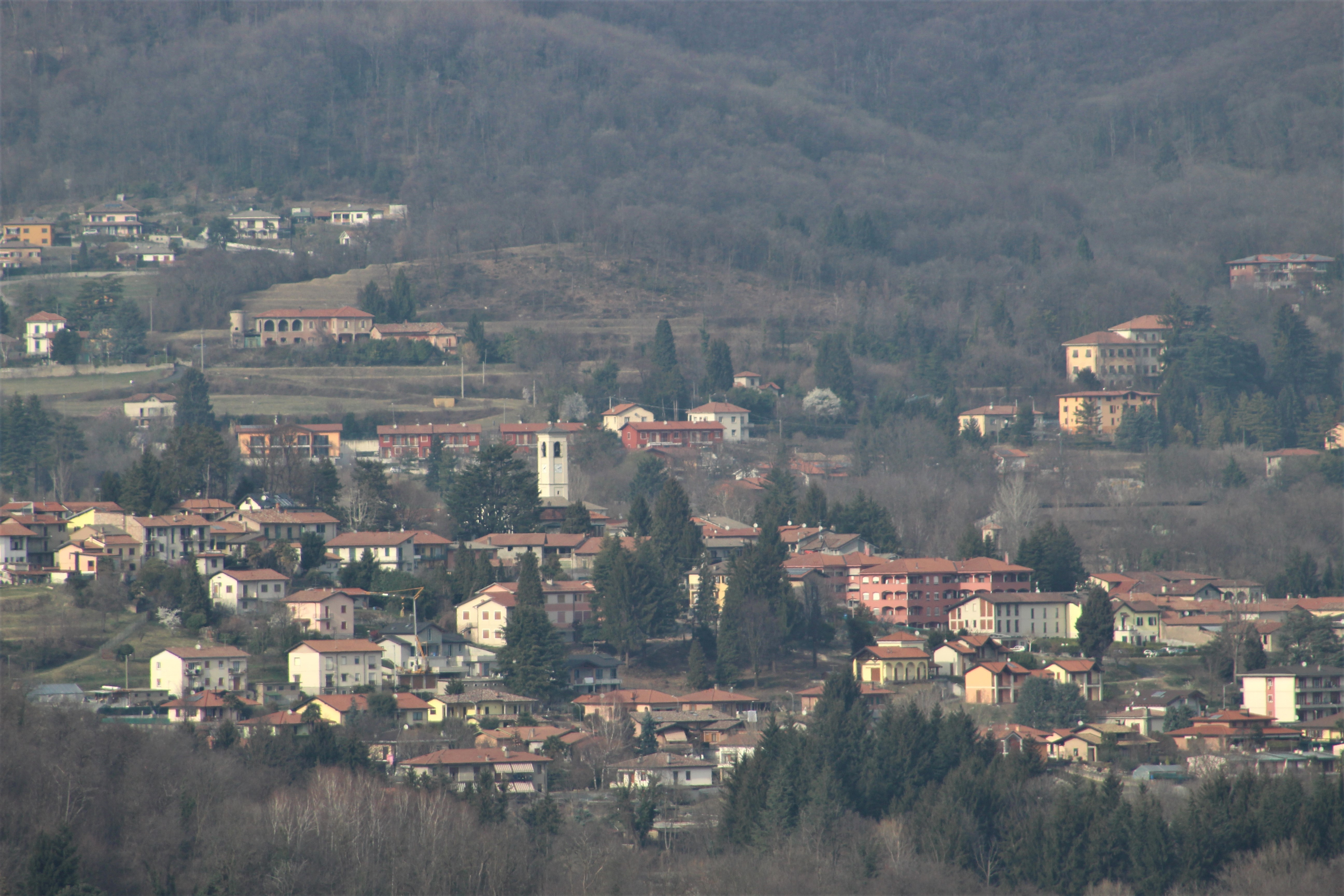

- Coat of arms

- Location within Italy Location within Lombardy
- Coordinates: 45°52′N 8°56′E
- Country: Italy
- Region: Lombardy
- Province: Province of Varese (VA)

Area
  - Total: 2.9 km^{2} (1.1 sq mi)

Population (Dec. 2004)
  - Total: 2,010
  - Density: 690/km^{2} (1,800/sq mi)
- Demonym: Cliviesi
- Time zone: UTC+1 (CET)
  - Summer (DST): UTC+2 (CEST)
- Postal code: 21050
- Dialing code: 0332

Clivio is a comune (municipality) in the Province of Varese in the Italian region Lombardy, located about 50 kilometres (31 mi) northwest of Milan and about 10 kilometres (6 mi) northeast of Varese, on the border with Switzerland. As of 31 December 2004, it had a population of 2,010 and an area of 2.9 square kilometres (1.1 mi^{2}).

Clivio borders the following municipalities: Arzo (Switzerland), Besazio (Switzerland), Cantello, Ligornetto (Switzerland), Saltrio, Stabio (Switzerland), Viggiù.

== Demographic evolution ==
Historical population

Year	Pop.	±%
1861	748	—
1871	831	+11.1%
1881	953	+14.7%
1901	997	+4.6%
1911	1,043	+4.6%

Year	Pop.	±%
1921	940	−9.9%
1931	930	−1.1%
1936	867	−6.8%
1951	927	+6.9%
1961	1,121	+20.9%

Year	Pop.	±%
1971	1,579	+40.9%
1981	1,710	+8.3%
1991	1,802	+5.4%
2001	1,963	+8.9%

Source: Data from ISTAT
