= Spartaco Vela =

Italian painter

Spartaco Vela (22 March 1854 – 23 June 1895) was a Swiss painter mainly active in Milan, Italy.

== Biography ==
Vela was born on 22 March 1854 in Turin, the only child of Swiss sculptor Vincenzo Vela and Sabina Vela-Dragoni. He was raised in Turin until 1867, when he moved along with his parents to the family's hometown of Ligornetto, in the Swiss canton of Ticino. His first lessons in design were by his own father, who encouraged him to draw al vero and not copy masterpieces as many textbooks suggested. Influenced by his father, Vela attended the Brera Academy in Milan between 1869 and 1879, where he studied painting with Giuseppe Bertini, Eleuterio Pagliano and Mosè Bianchi, forming a lasting friendship with the latter. Vela was meticulous in producing works, dedicating himself to various esoteric studies. On the occasion of the National Exposition of Milan he sent the largest canvas featured in the exhibition. It was titled Rizpah after Niobe from the Bible, the guardian of the bodies of his sons hanged by King David.

Although he was never married, Vela fathered a son in 1881. He was a member of the masonic lodge La Ragione of Milan. Vela died in Ligornetto on 23 June 1895.

== Museo Vincenzo Vela ==
In 1892, after his father's death, Vela donated his house and works in his studio to the Swiss government for the establishment of the Museo Vincenzo Vela in Ligornetto. The house, originally designed by the architect Cipriano Ajmetti, was restructured in 2001 by architect Mario Botta. The collection displays the works of Vincenzo as well as some of Spartaco's paintings and a series of sculptures of his uncle (and Vincenzo's brother) Lorenzo Vela. Among Spartaco's works at the museum are Lavatoio, Studio di nudo femminile, La strada presso la cava and Canal Grande.
