= Silvio Poma =

Italian painter (1840–1932)

- Born: 1840; Trescore Balneario, Bergamo
- Died: 1932 (aged 91–92); Turate, Como
- Style: landscape painting
- Awards: Mylius Prize of the Brera Academy of Fine Arts in 1876
- Patrons: Vittorio Emanuele II

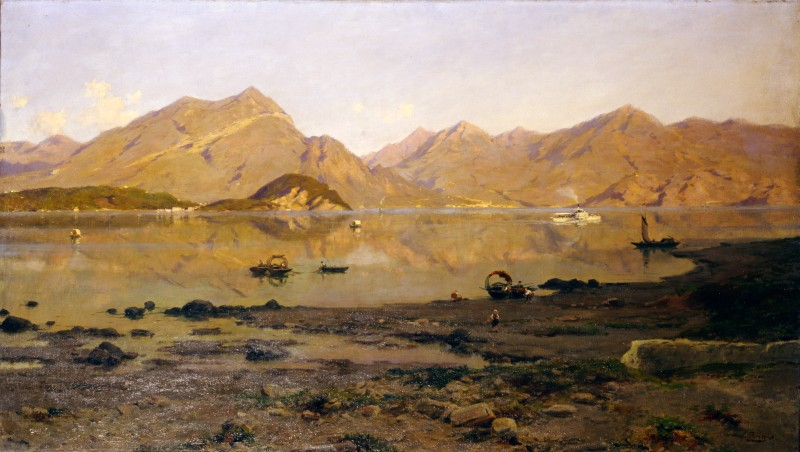
Lago di Como o Paesaggio Lacustre, ca.1890 (Art collections of Fondazione Cariplo)

Silvio Poma (1840–1932) was an Italian painter, known mainly for his paintings of landscapes of the Lombardy lake district.

== Birth and military career ==
He was born in Trescore Balneario, Bergamo. Having served as a volunteer in the Second Italian War of Independence, Poma embarked on a military career by 1859–1860. In 1866, after contracting malaria, he finally retired from an army life. On his return to Milan, he worked in the studios of his fellow soldier-painters in the military campaign of 1859, Giovan Battista Lelli and Gerolamo Induno.

== Artistic career ==
He made his debut at the Esposizione di Belle Arti of the Brera of 1869 but received no official recognition until halfway through the following decade. A painting of a historical subject, Macbeth and the Witches of Dunsinane wood, depicted in a Romantic natural setting, won the Mylius Prize of the Brera Academy of Fine Arts in 1876. A landscape exhibited in Naples, Da Malgrate a Lecco, at the Esposizione Nazionale of Naples was bought by Vittorio Emanuele II in 1877. These helped propel his career.

At the 1881 National Exposition of Milan he exhibited Abbadia sul Lago di Lecco; Monterosso; Lago di Como; Punta di Palianzo; at Milan in 1883 he exhibited Riva presso Abbadia; A bosco luganese; Chestnut Forest; Lago di Pescate; at Rome in 1883 he displayed Lago di Pescate; at the Exhibition of Turin del 1884 Il bosco di Pianazzo a bosco Luganese; Shore of Vercurago; il Monte Rosa; vicinanze di Sesto Calende; Lago di Lugano, ramo d' Agno; at Milan in 1886 I corni di Canto di Valmadrera; Il monte San Martino; Il monte Legnane; Panorama di Lecco; at Venice in 1887 Il Ponte di Lecco; Pescarenico suil'Adda e Sul Lago''; and finally at Bologna in 1888 Alture di Menaggio; La punta di Bellaggio and Pescarenico e il Monte San Martino.

Poma established his reputation as a landscape painter with a repertoire of lake views that are intimist in character, while also displaying the influence of his contemporary Filippo Carcano in their realistic approach. The period from 1883 onwards saw an increase in activity with the systematic presentation of works at national exhibitions and lasting success on the art market.

Poma died in 1932 in Turate, Como.

== Other projects ==
Media related to Silvio Poma at Wikimedia Commons
