= Fausto Papetti =

- Born: 28 January 1923; Viggiù, Lombardy, Italy
- Died: 15 June 1999 (aged 76); San Remo, Liguria, Italy
- Genres: Jazz
- Occupation: Saxophonist
- Instrument: Saxophone
- Years active: 1955–1999
- Labels: Jolly, Durium, CBS, Fonit Cetra

Fausto Papetti (Viggiù, 28 January 1923 – San Remo, 15 June 1999) was an Italian alto saxophone player. A jazz musician by formation, Papetti became widely known for producing instrumental covers of some of the most famous pop and jazz songs.

Papetti reached the height of his popularity in the 1960s and 1970s. His albums were particularly successful in the European and Latin American markets. During the 1970s, Papetti's first greatest hits album, published in 1975, is to these days his best-selling album. His performance of the song "Love's Theme" (originally by Barry White's Love Unlimited Orchestra) was featured on the breakbeat compilation Ultimate Breaks and Beats. His influence on saxophone music was substantial and in the 1970s many imitators appeared, like Johnny Sax and Piergiorgio Farina.

Papetti's records are also characterized for their sexy covers, often featuring scantily clad women. He occasionally recorded under the pseudonym Fausto Danieli.

== Discography ==
=== Albums ===
- The Sexy Sax (1979)
- Old America (1981)
- My One and Only Love (1982)
- Sax Idea (1984)
- Midnight Blue (1985)
- Il Mondo Di Papetti, Vol. 2 (1986)
- Baby Blue Music, Vol. 1 (1987)
- Il Mondo Di Papetti, Vol. 3 (1987)
- Baby Blue Music, Vol. 2 (1987)
- Us and Them (1988)
- Midnight Melodies (1988)
- Magic Sax (1990)
- Ecos de New York, Vol. 2 (1991)
- Ecos de Hollywood (1991)
- Ecos de Brasil, Vol. 2 (1991)
- Ecos de Italia, Vol. 2 (1991)
- Maria Elena (1991)
- Feelings (1991)
- Sax in Gold (1994)
- El Cine (1994)
- El Mundo de Fausto Papetti (1994)
- Fausto Papetti (1995)
- The Magic Sax of Fausto Papetti (1995)
- More Feelings (1996)
- More Feelings Again (1996)
- Sax Latino (1997)
- Made in Italy [Ricordi] (1997)
- What a Wonderful World [Expanded] (1998)
- Calda Estate (1999)
- The Look of Love (2000)
- Evergreens, Vol. 2 (2001)
- E Se Domani (2003)
- Ritmi Dell'America Latina (2003)
- Moon River (2003)
- Chloe (2003)
- Evergreens No. 3 (2003)
- Scandalo Al Sole [D.V. More] (2003)
- If You Leave Me Now (2003)
- Accarezzami (2003)
- Cinema: Anni 70 (2003)
- Cinema: Anni 60 (2003)
- Made in Italy [BMG] (2003)
- Bonjour France (2003)
- Evergreens (2003)
- Memory (2003)
- Musica Nel Mondo, Vol. 2 (2004)
- Musica Nel Mondo (2004)

=== Box sets and compilations ===
- Il Mondo Di Papetti (1988)
- All Time Favorites (1991)
- 20 Exitos, Vol. 2 (1994)
- 20 Exitos (1994)
- Scandalo Al Sole [Replay] (1995)
- Gli Anni D'Oro (1997)
- Econo Series (1997)
- What a Wonderful World (1998)
- Oggi, Vol. 4 (1999)
- Oggi, Vol. 3 (1999)
- Oggi, Vol. 2 (1999)
- Oggi, Vol. 1 (1999)
- I Grandi Successi Originali (2000)
- Fausto Papetti Collection (2006)
- Le Piu Belle Melodie di Fausto Papetti (2006)
- Fausto Papetti Collection, Vol. 2 (2006)
