= Sandy Cane =

Italian politician (born 1961)

Sandra Cane

Mayor of Viggiù
- In office June 2009 – 2014
- Preceded by: Federico Rizzi
- Succeeded by: Antonio Mario Giovanni Banfi

Personal details
- Born: Sandra Maria Cane; July 28, 1961 (age 65) Springfield, Massachusetts, U.S.
- Party: Lega Nord
- Occupation: Politician, Hotel Director
- Known for: First female non-white mayor in Italy

Sandra "Sandy" Maria Cane (born July 28, 1961, in Springfield, Massachusetts) is an Italian politician who is the former mayor of Viggiù comune.

Cane's father is African American and her mother is Italian, a native of Viggiù. After her parents' divorce in 1971, Cane moved to her mother's hometown. Holding a degree in foreign languages, she started to work in tourism sector and became the director of a hotel. She is also well-versed in the local Western Lombard dialect (dialetto bosino).

Cane became Lega Nord's candidate for Viggiù mayor in June 2009 elections. She was elected the first female non-white mayor of Italy after winning about 30% of the votes. In an interview with The Independent, she said that she was an Obama supporter.
