= Saltrio =

- Comune
- Comune di Saltrio
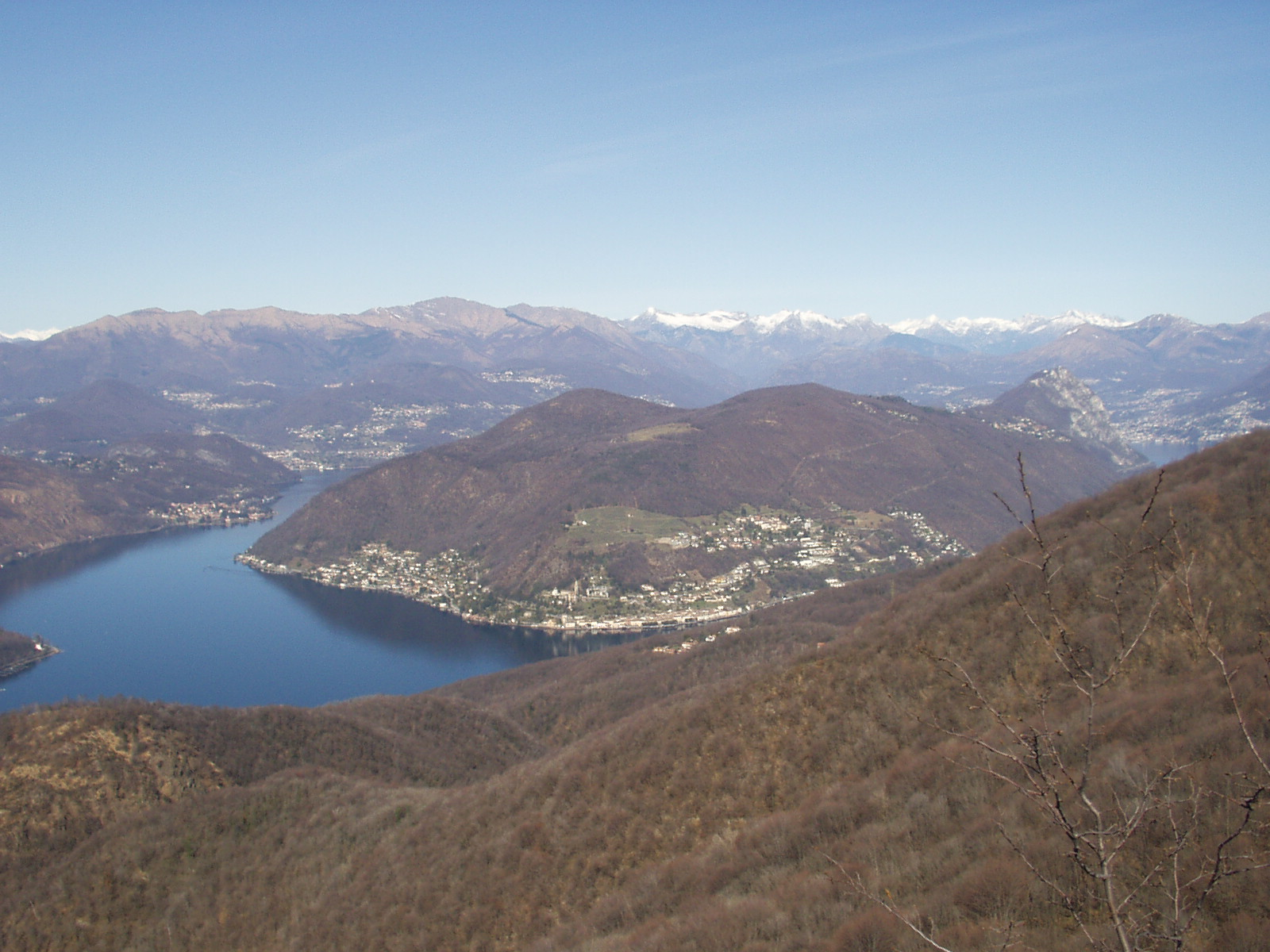
- Lugano Lake seen from the Orsa Mountain

- Location within Italy Location within Lombardy
- Coordinates: 45°52′N 8°55′E
- Country: Italy
- Region: Lombardy
- Province: Province of Varese (VA)

Area
  - Total: 3.5 km^{2} (1.4 sq mi)

Population (Dec. 2004)
  - Total: 2,925
  - Density: 840/km^{2} (2,200/sq mi)
- Demonym: Saltriesi
- Time zone: UTC+1 (CET)
  - Summer (DST): UTC+2 (CEST)
- Postal code: 21050
- Dialing code: 0332

Saltrio is a comune (municipality) in the Province of Varese in the Italian region Lombardy, located about 50 kilometres (31 mi) northwest of Milan and about 9 kilometres (6 mi) northeast of Varese, on the border with Switzerland. As of 31 December 2004, it had a population of 2,925 and an area of 3.5 square kilometres (1.4 mi^{2}).

Saltrio borders the following municipalities: Arzo (Switzerland), Clivio, Meride (Switzerland), Viggiù.

== Demographic evolution ==
Historical population

Year	Pop.	±%
1861	716	—
1871	794	+10.9%
1881	919	+15.7%
1901	1,033	+12.4%
1911	1,128	+9.2%

Year	Pop.	±%
1921	906	−19.7%
1931	956	+5.5%
1936	869	−9.1%
1951	957	+10.1%
1961	1,417	+48.1%

Year	Pop.	±%
1971	2,292	+61.8%
1981	2,779	+21.2%
1991	2,925	+5.3%
2001	2,857	−2.3%

Source: Data from ISTAT
