= Meride =

- Former municipality
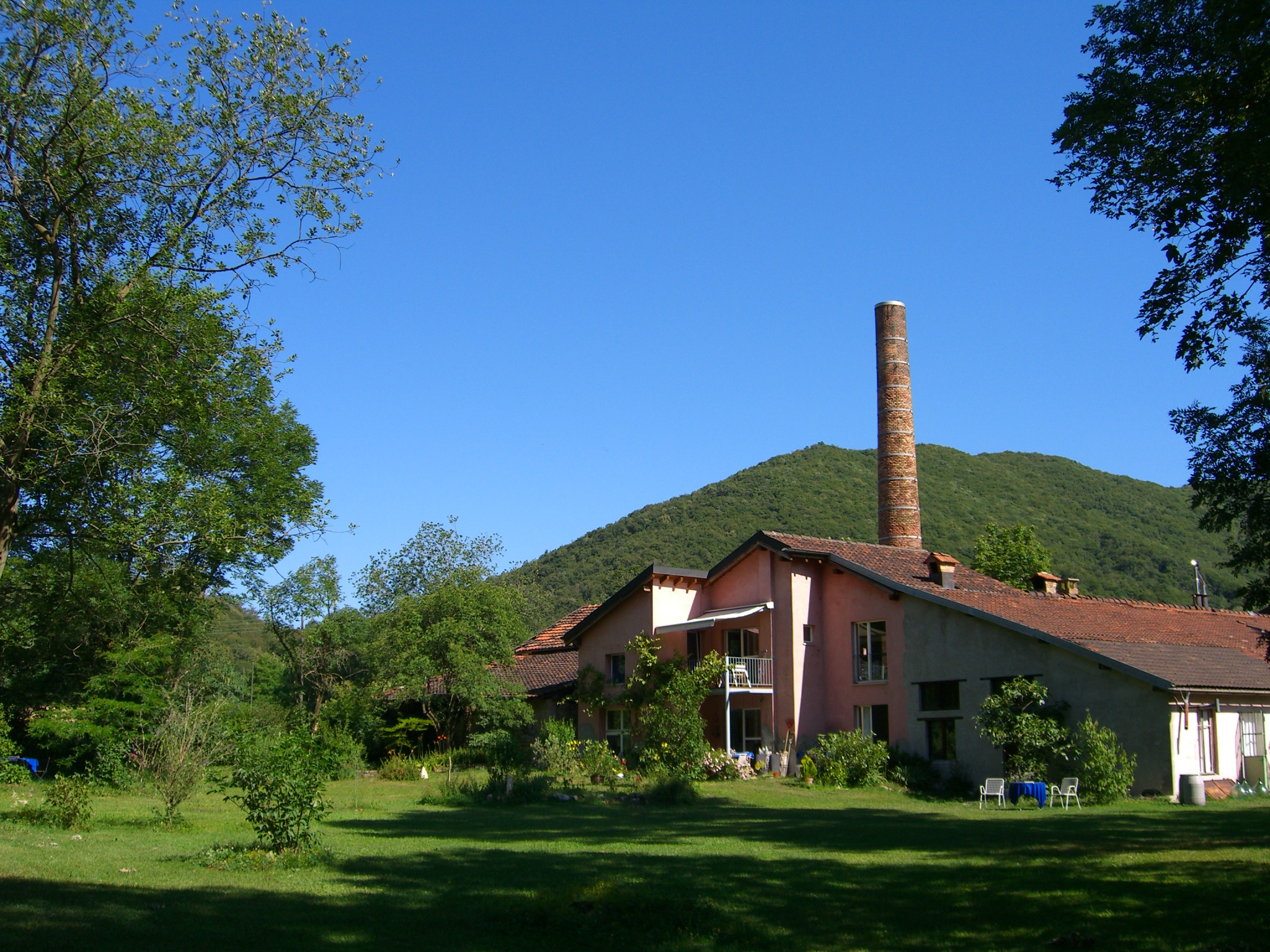
- Camino Spinirolo near Meride village

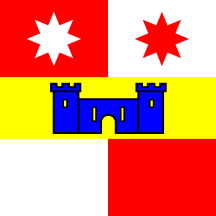
- Flag Coat of arms
- Location of Meride
- Location within Switzerland Location within Canton of Ticino
- Coordinates: 45°53′N 8°56′E
- Country: Switzerland
- Canton: Ticino
- District: Mendrisio

Area
  - Total: 7.46 km^{2} (2.88 sq mi)
- Elevation: 583 m (1,913 ft)

Population (Dec 2011)
  - Total: 314
  - Density: 42.1/km^{2} (109/sq mi)
- Time zone: UTC+01:00 (CET)
  - Summer (DST): UTC+02:00 (CEST)
- Postal code: 6866
- SFOS number: 5255
- ISO 3166 code: CH-TI
- Surrounded by: Arzo, Besano (IT-VA), Brusino Arsizio, Porto Ceresio (IT-VA), Riva San Vitale, Saltrio (IT-VA), Tremona, Viggiù (IT-VA)
- Website: meride.ch

Meride is a village and former municipality in the district of Mendrisio in the canton of Ticino in Switzerland. On 14 April 2013 the former municipalities of Besazio, Ligornetto and Meride merged into the municipality of Mendrisio.

== History ==
Meride is first mentioned in 852 as Melede. In 1430 it was mentioned as Merede.

The area around Meride is of great interest to geologists and paleontologists, due to a Triassic chalk formation, the so-called Meridekalk. Excavation projects at the Monte San Giorgio in the chalk have discovered several new fossils.

In 963, the Benedictine abbey of S. Ambrogio in Milan gave their property and farms in Meride to the monastery of San Pietro in Lodi. During the Middle Ages it was part of the Pieve of Riva San Vitale. It formed, along with Besazio and Tremona, a Terzi (third) of the Pieve. The Terzi shared the grazing and timber rights to the surrounding fields and forests.

In 1483, Meride separated from the mother church at Riva San Vitale, and became an independent parish. In the same year, the former parish church of San Silvestro, was built on a hill above the village. San Silvestro stands on the remains of what was probably a castle, and the remains of which were integrated into the church. The current parish church of San Rocco, was built in 1578, expanded in 1770–72 and restored in 1969–70. On a hill near the village, a hermitage was built by the blessed Manfredo Settala (12th century-1217). Next to the hermitage, the 13th century chapel of Saint George was built.

In the past farming and grazing was the main occupation. In the 20th century the continual population decline continued, until the 1990s when new living spaces allowed the population to stabilize. In 2000 two-thirds of the working population commuted to other municipalities for work. In 1973 a fossil museum opened in Meride. More recently, the summer tourism industry has gained a foothold in the village.

== Geography ==
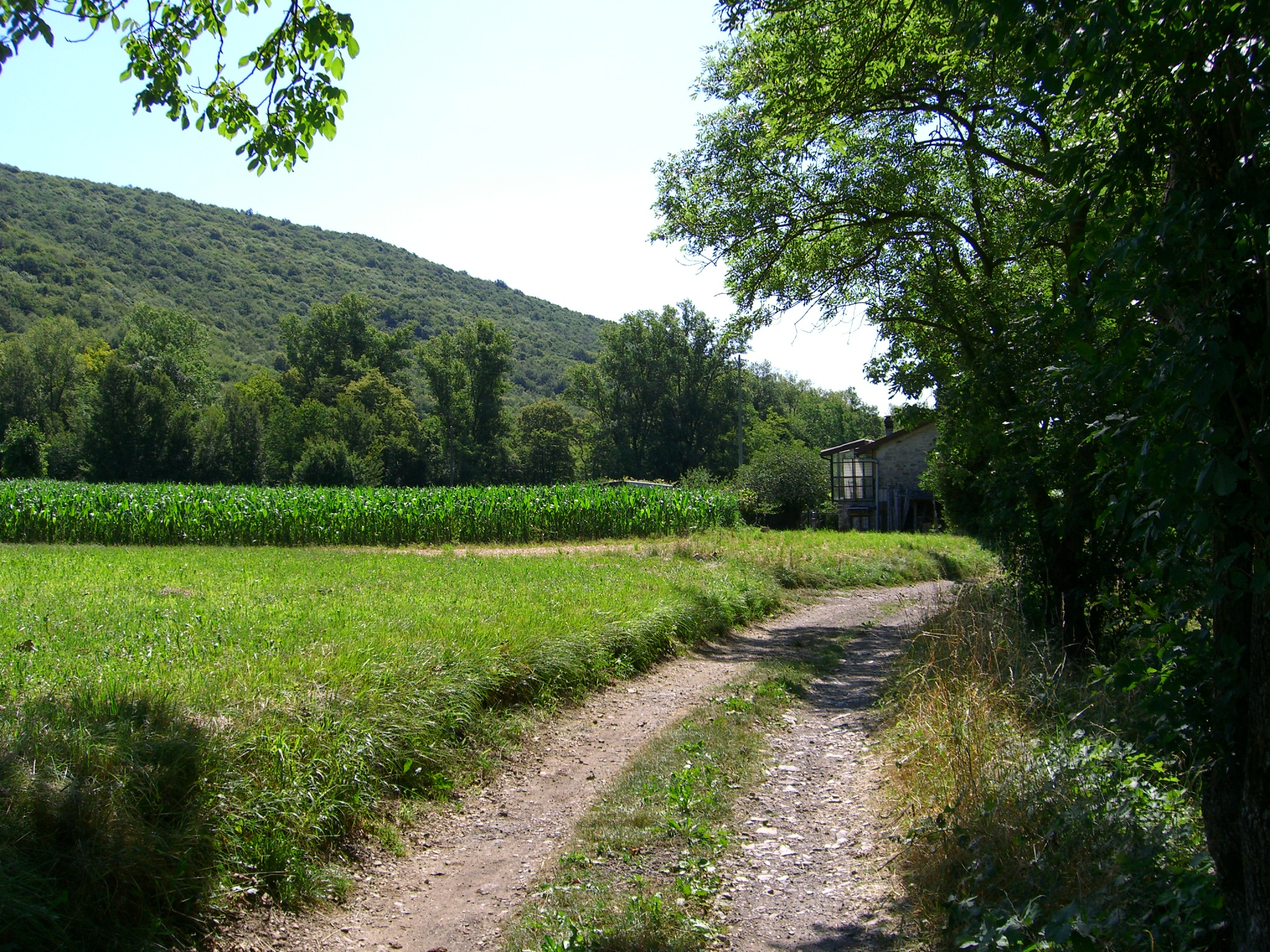
Dirt track near Meride

Before the merger, Meride had a total area of 7.5 km^{2} (2.9 mi^{2}). Of this area, 0.74 km^{2} (0.29 sq mi) or 9.9% is used for agricultural purposes, while 6.61 km^{2} (2.55 sq mi) or 88.6% is forested. Of the rest of the land, 0.13 km^{2} (32 acres) or 1.7% is settled (buildings or roads) and 0.05 km^{2} (12 acres) or 0.7% is unproductive land.

Of the built up area, housing and buildings made up 0.8% and transportation infrastructure made up 0.8%. Out of the forested land, 86.3% of the total land area is heavily forested and 1.9% is covered with orchards or small clusters of trees. Of the agricultural land, 7.6% is used for growing crops, while 1.5% is used for orchards or vine crops.

The municipality is located in the Mendrisio district. It stretches from the peak of San Giorgio mountain down to the lower slope of the mountain, where the village center lies.

== Coat of arms ==
The blazon of the municipal coat of arms is Quartered gules and argent in each chief quarters a mullet of eight counterchanged and overall on a fess or a gates with two towers azure.

== Demographics ==
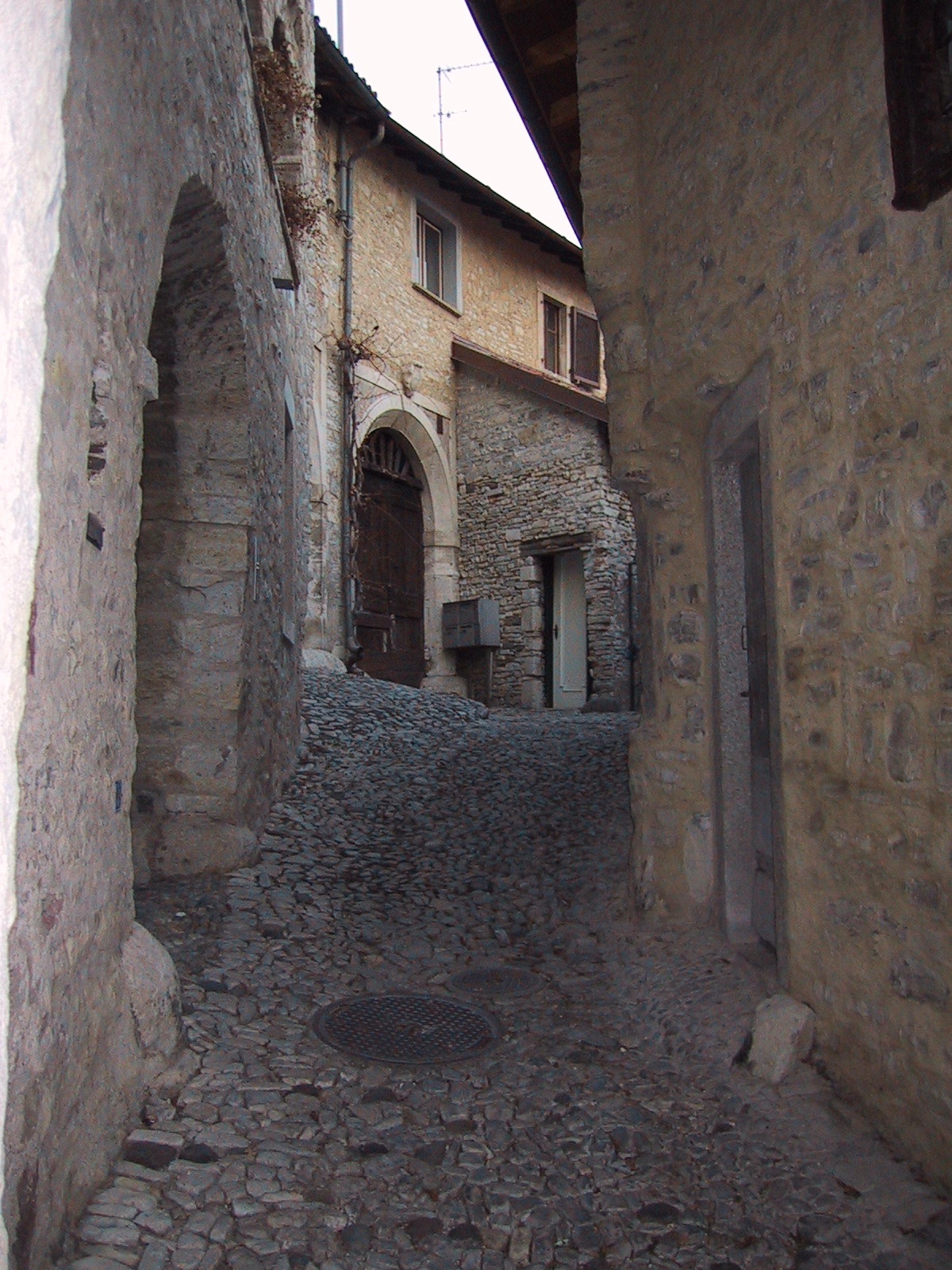
A narrow lane in Meride

Meride had a population (as of 2011) of 314. As of 2008, 5.7% of the population are resident foreign nationals. Over the last 10 years (1997–2007) the population has changed at a rate of 1.9%.

Most of the population (as of 2000) speaks Italian (84.6%), with German being second most common (11.6%) and French being third (1.4%). Of the Swiss national languages (as of 2000), 34 speak German, 4 people speak French, 248 people speak Italian, and 2 people speak Romansh. The remainder (5 people) speak another language.

As of 2008, the gender distribution of the population was 47.4% male and 52.6% female. The population was made up of 143 Swiss men (43.2% of the population), and 14 (4.2%) non-Swiss men. There were 167 Swiss women (50.5%), and 7 (2.1%) non-Swiss women.

In 2008 there was 1 live birth to Swiss citizens and were 3 deaths of Swiss citizens. Ignoring immigration and emigration, the population of Swiss citizens decreased by 2 while the foreign population remained the same. There was 1 Swiss man and 1 Swiss woman who immigrated back to Switzerland. At the same time, there was 1 non-Swiss woman who immigrated from another country to Switzerland. The total Swiss population change in 2008 (from all sources, including moves across municipal borders) was an increase of 6 and the non-Swiss population change was a decrease of 1 people. This represents a population growth rate of 1.5%.

The age distribution, as of 2009, in Meride is; 20 children or 6.0% of the population are between 0 and 9 years old and 31 teenagers or 9.4% are between 10 and 19. Of the adult population, 37 people or 11.2% of the population are between 20 and 29 years old. 37 people or 11.2% are between 30 and 39, 48 people or 14.5% are between 40 and 49, and 47 people or 14.2% are between 50 and 59. The senior population distribution is 54 people or 16.3% of the population are between 60 and 69 years old, 26 people or 7.9% are between 70 and 79, there are 31 people or 9.4% who are over 80.

As of 2000, there were 137 private households in the municipality, and an average of 2.1 persons per household. In 2000 there were 105 single family homes (or 70.5% of the total) out of a total of 149 inhabited buildings. There were 35 multi-family buildings (23.5%), along with 4 multi-purpose buildings that were mostly used for housing (2.7%) and 5 other use buildings (commercial or industrial) that also had some housing (3.4%). Of the single family homes 24 were built before 1919, while 12 were built between 1990 and 2000. The greatest number of single family homes (41) were built between 1919 and 1945.

In 2000 there were 206 apartments in the municipality. The most common apartment size was 4 rooms of which there were 52. There were 6 single room apartments and 64 apartments with five or more rooms. Of these apartments, a total of 137 apartments (66.5% of the total) were permanently occupied, while 66 apartments (32.0%) were seasonally occupied and 3 apartments (1.5%) were empty. The vacancy rate for the municipality, in 2008, was 0%. As of 2007, the construction rate of new housing units was 0 new units per 1000 residents.

The historical population is given in the following chart:

== Heritage sites of national significance ==
The Church of S. Silvestro is listed as a Swiss heritage site of national significance. The entire village of Meride is listed as part of the Inventory of Swiss Heritage Sites.

== Politics ==
In the 2007 federal election the most popular party was the SP which received 39.08% of the vote. The next three most popular parties were the CVP (36.42%), the FDP (7.82%) and the Green Party (7.17%). In the federal election, a total of 160 votes were cast, and the voter turnout was 46.1%.

In the 2007 Gran Consiglio election, there were a total of 254 registered voters in Meride, of which 201 or 79.1% voted. 3 blank ballots were cast, leaving 198 valid ballots in the election. The most popular party was the PPD+GenGiova which received 66 or 33.3% of the vote. The next three most popular parties were; the PS (with 62 or 31.3%), the SSI (with 30 or 15.2%) and the PLRT (with 15 or 7.6%).

In the 2007 Consiglio di Stato election, 2 blank ballots and 1 null ballot were cast, leaving 198 valid ballots in the election. The most popular party was the PS which received 71 or 35.9% of the vote. The next three most popular parties were; the PPD (with 70 or 35.4%), the SSI (with 27 or 13.6%) and the PLRT (with 14 or 7.1%).

== Economy ==
As of 2007, Meride had an unemployment rate of 2.86%. As of 2005, there were 17 people employed in the primary economic sector and about 6 businesses involved in this sector. 2 people were employed in the secondary sector and there was 1 business in this sector. 33 people were employed in the tertiary sector, with 13 businesses in this sector.

There were 133 residents of the municipality who were employed in some capacity, of which females made up 45.9% of the workforce. In 2008's statistics the total number of full-time equivalent jobs was 39. The number of jobs in the primary sector was 9, all of which were in agriculture. The number of jobs in the secondary sector was 2, all of which were in construction. The number of jobs in the tertiary sector was 28. In the tertiary sector; 2 or 7.1% were in wholesale or retail sales or the repair of motor vehicles, 1 or 3.6% were in the movement and storage of goods, 10 or 35.7% were in a hotel or restaurant, 5 or 17.9% were in the information industry and 2 or 7.1% were in education.

In 2000, there were 26 workers who commuted into the municipality and 95 workers who commuted away. The municipality is a net exporter of workers, with about 3.7 workers leaving the municipality for every one entering. About 34.6% of the workforce coming into Meride are coming from outside Switzerland. Of the working population, 5.3% used public transportation to get to work, and 64.7% used a private car.

As of 2009, there was one hotel in Meride.

== Religion ==
From the 2000 census, 219 or 74.7% were Roman Catholic, while 21 or 7.2% belonged to the Swiss Reformed Church. There are 49 individuals (or about 16.72% of the population) who belong to another church (not listed on the census), and 4 individuals (or about 1.37% of the population) did not answer the question.

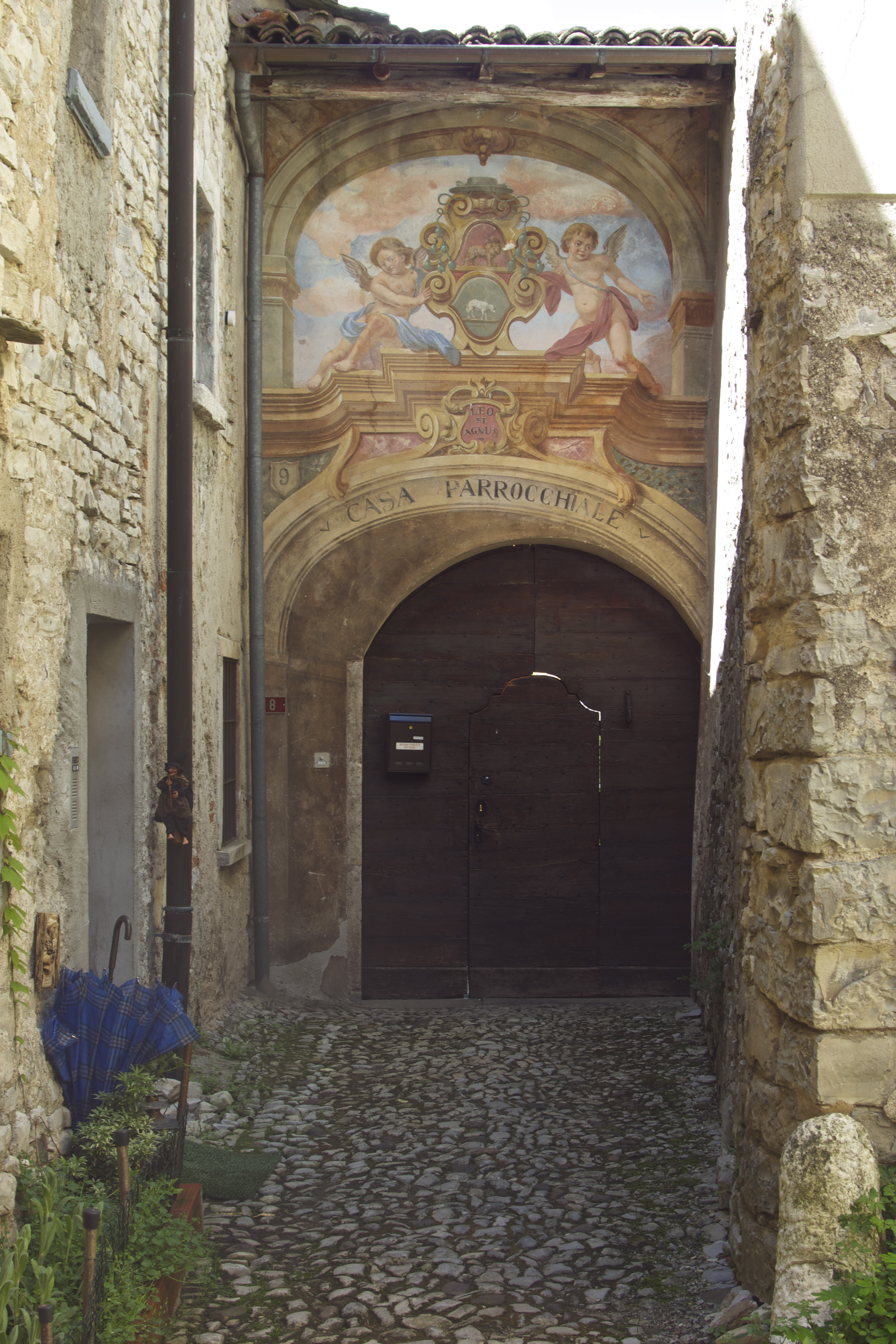
Casa Parrocchiale Meride

== Education ==
In Meride about 79.9% of the population (between age 25–64) have completed either non-mandatory upper secondary education or additional higher education (either university or a Fachhochschule).

In Meride there were a total of 51 students (as of 2009). The Ticino education system provides up to three years of non-mandatory kindergarten and in Meride there were 6 children in kindergarten. The primary school program lasts for five years and includes both a standard school and a special school. In the municipality, 11 students attended the standard primary schools and 2 students attended the special school. In the lower secondary school system, students either attend a two-year middle school followed by a two-year pre-apprenticeship or they attend a four-year program to prepare for higher education. There were 15 students in the two-year middle school, while 9 students were in the four-year advanced program.

The upper secondary school includes several options, but at the end of the upper secondary program, a student will be prepared to enter a trade or to continue on to a university or college. In Ticino, vocational students may either attend school while working on their internship or apprenticeship (which takes three or four years) or may attend school followed by an internship or apprenticeship (which takes one year as a full-time student or one and a half to two years as a part-time student). There were 4 vocational students who were attending school full-time and 3 who attend part-time.

The professional program lasts three years and prepares a student for a job in engineering, nursing, computer science, business, tourism and similar fields. There was 1 student in the professional program.

As of 2000, there were 43 students from Meride who attended schools outside the municipality.
