= Antonio Bottinelli =

Italian sculptor (1827–1898)

Antonio Bottinelli (Viggiù, September 8, 1827 – Viggiù, September 26, 1898) was an Italian sculptor.

He was born in the town of Viggiù, in the province of Varese. He completed his studies at the Accademia di Belle Arti of Como, and moved to Rome in 1852. There, he completed his first statue, Armida, then exhibited and sold it at the World Exposition in Paris of 1855. He continued to exhibit abroad, and in 1858, moved to Paris for a year. In 1859, he returned as a volunteer to fight in the campaigns for Italian Independence. Afterwards, he moved to Milan and exhibited statues and busts at the Promotrici of Milan, Turin, and Genoa. In 1861, he held an exhibit in London with the statues: La Cenci and La Virgen Camilla (Camilla, mythical queen of the Volsci). In 1867, he displayed La Toilette at the Esposizione Mondiale of Paris. All were sold.

He then completed three statues for the Duomo of Milan. In 1868, he returned to Rome; he confessed to preferring to live poor in Rome, than rich somewhere else. In Rome, he completed the following marble statues: Le prime Rose (The first Rose); La Vanità (The Vanity); La Modestia (The Modesty); La Solitudine; La Schiava; L'Ondina; La Saffo (Sapho); Il Bacio (The Kiss); L'Aria; L'Agricoltura (The Agriculture); Prima Comunione (First Communion); Pudicìzia; Speranza (bust, Hope); Al Teatro : Ritorno dal Teatro; Najade; Triade; La Romana; Stella del Mattino; Gioia; Faunina and "Affection" (Affetto). He garnered medals at the World Exhibitions of Vienna (1873), Philadelphia (1876), Melbourne (1881), Nizza (1884); as well as exhibitions at Munich, Berlino, Amsterdam, and Antwerp,

At Melbourne and Philadelphia, he exhibited four female busts depicting Le quattro stagioni (the four seasons). Bottinelli was knighted and became an honorary associate of the Academies of Fine Arts of Milan and Urbino.
