= Giovanni Servi =

Italian painter

Giovanni Servi (1795 or 1800 – 1885) was an Italian painter of the Romantic period.

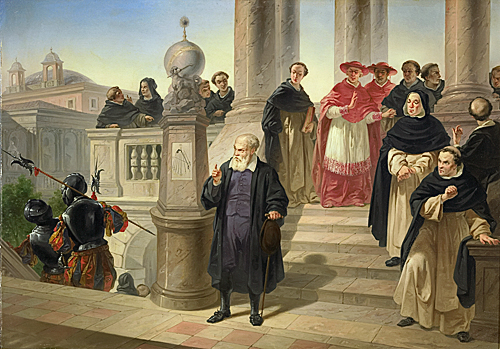
Galileo Before His Trial by the Inquisition

He was born in Venice, but died in Milan. Together with Giuseppe Sogni, he was an adjunct professor at the Accademia di Brera. He was strongly influenced by Francesco Hayez and Pelagio Palagi. Most of his work consists of historical canvases.
