= Eleuterio Pagliano =

Italian painter (1826–1903)

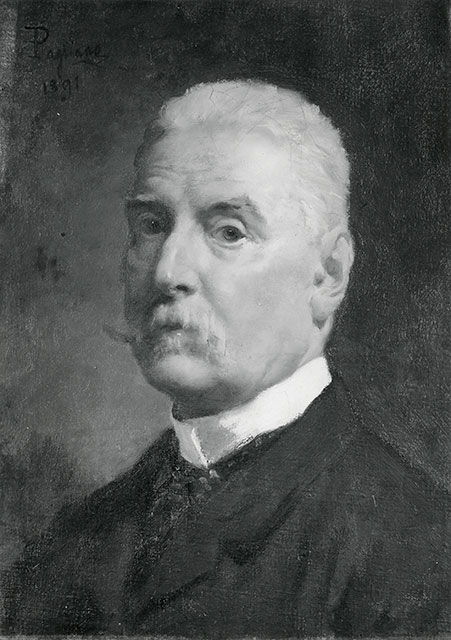
Self-portrait, 1891

Eleuterio Pagliano (2 May 1826 – 5 January 1903) was an Italian painter of the Romantic period as well as an activist and fighter of the Risorgimento.

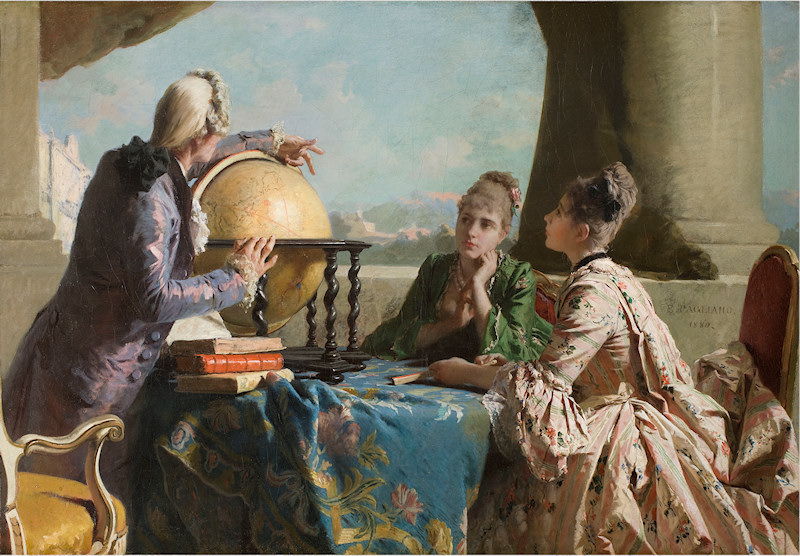
Pagliano Eleuterio, La lezione di geografia, Geography lessons - 1880 depiction of 18th-century scene

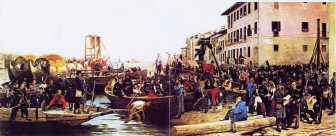
Eleuterio Pagliano, Lo sbarco di Garibaldi e dei suoi Cacciatori delle Alpi a Sesto Calende May 23, 1859, 230 cm x 600 cm, Oil on canvas, Varese Civic Museum.

== Biography ==
Pagliano was born in Casale Monferrato in the Kingdom of Sardinia and studied at the Brera Academy in Milan until 1848. He initially trained with Giuseppe Sogni, then under the neoclassic painter Luigi Sabatelli. He began his artistic career with paintings in a distinctly Neoclassical style, but very quickly he was won over to Romanticism, as championed then in Milan by Hayez and Tranquillo Cremona. He painted the Death of Luciano Manara.

He again joined the Risorgimento and participated in the popular revolt against the Austrian garrison in Milan known as the cinque giornate of 1848. He joined the Bersaglieri di Manara in the defense of the Republic of Rome in 1848, but returned to painting by 1851. The urge to battle resumed in 1859, when he rejoined the army fighting in Lombardy.

Again returning to art after his stint in the militias, he painted Presa del cimitero di Solferino, a battle in which he participated. In 1872, his painting of Maramaldo (referring to Fabrizio Maramaldo), awarded a prize at the Milan Exhibition, was sold to the Khedive of Egypt. Pagliano also won prizes for works at the 1867 Exhibitions of Parma, Turin, and Paris, and a gold medal at the Berlin Exhibition. Among his main works are: La Ragione di Stato (Reasons of State); The Divorce of Napoleon I; Tintoretto paints his dead daughter's portrait; L'inventario (The Inventory); La lezione di geografia (Geography Lesson); San Luigi, and the large canvas of Il passaggio del Ticino (1859) commissioned by Antonio Traversi of Verona. He painted large tempera paintings for the first-class waiting room at the train station of Milan. He also helped decorate theatres in Como and Verona. He was made an official in the Order of the Crown of Italy, Knight of the Order of Saints Maurizio e Lazzaro, knighted by King Leopold of Belgium, and knighted with the Legion d'Onore, and as a Commendatore of the Order of the Medjidie by the Ottoman rulers of Egypt.

Other painters who joined Garibaldi were Giuseppe Sogni, Gerolamo Induno, Paolo Calvi, and Sebastiano de Albertis. His artworks too—including a portrait of Garibaldi and a six-meter-wide painting (pictured) of the disembarkment of Garibaldi and his “Hunters of the Alps” at Sesto Calende on Lake Maggiore—reflected his patriotic involvement in the Italian Wars of Independence.

Later in his life, Pagliano became a teacher at the Brera Academy and counted among his pupils the painters Pompeo Mariani, Spartaco Vela, and Uberto Dell’Orto.

Eleuterio Pagliano died in Milan at the age of 75. During his lifetime his paintings had failed to make a great stir; however, his reputation increased when, shortly after his death, an exhibition in his honour was mounted in Milan.
