= Giuseppe Sogni =

Italian painter (1795–1874)

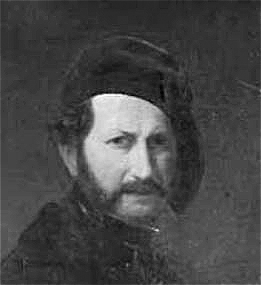
Self-portrait (date unknown)

Giuseppe Sogni (18 May 1795 – 11 August 1874) was an Italian painter, known for portraits and historical scenes.

== Biography ==
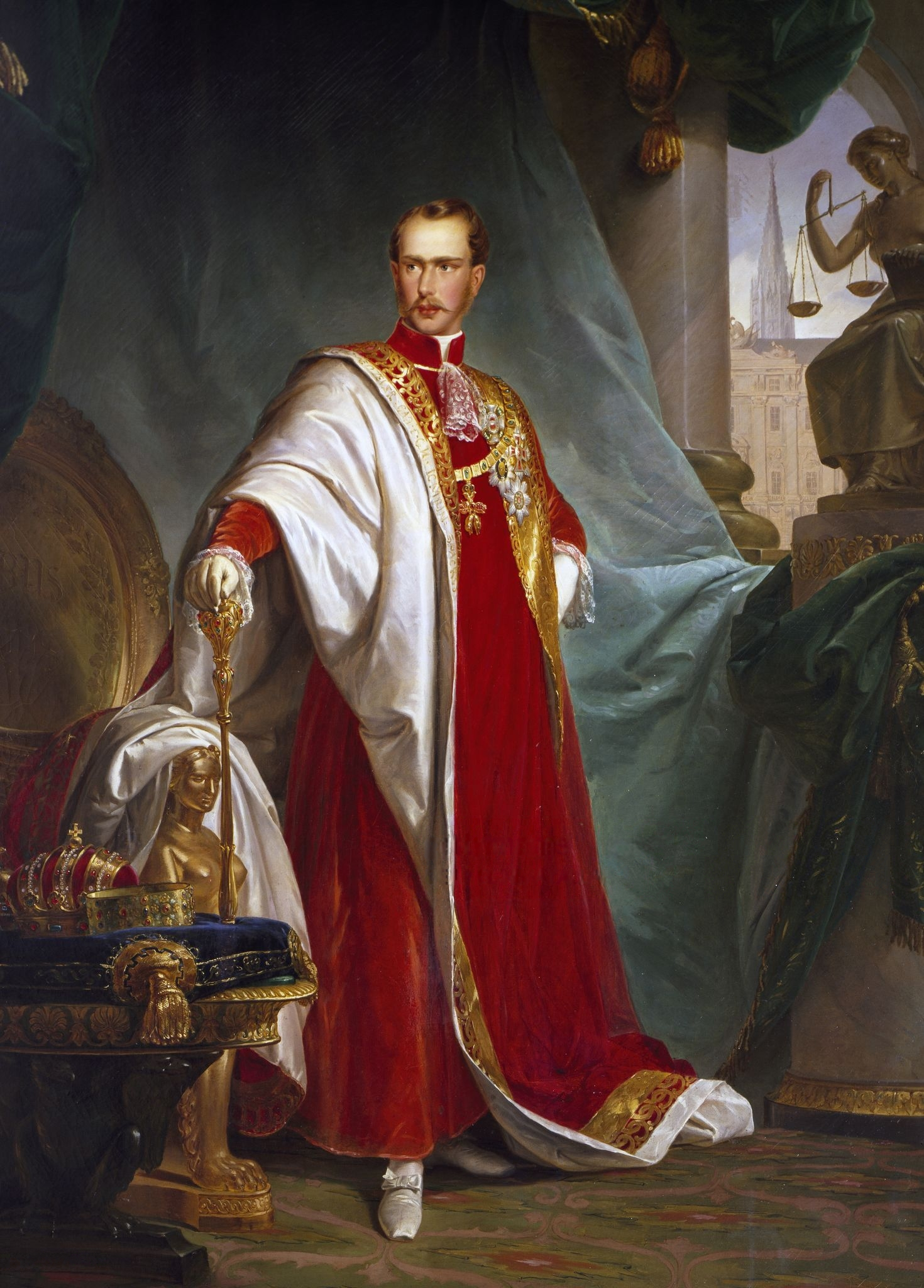
Austrian Emperor Franz Joseph I

He was born in Mediglia. His parents, Giovanni and Candida, née Cabrini, were tenant farmers. In 1804, they moved to Milan. After following his father's wishes and attending the military school in Pavia, he sought out his own interests and enrolled at the Accademia di Belle Arti di Brera in 1815. There, he studied sculpture with Camillo Pacetti and painting with Luigi Sabatelli. Despite Pacetti's urgings, he decided to devote himself entirely to painting.

In 1824, he became involved in his first major project; restoring the portraits of the benefactors at the Ospedale Maggiore. From then until 1834, he held regular exhibitions of historical paintings at the Accademia, where he became a full member in 1827. Three years later, he went to Rome; devoting himself mostly to religious paintings. In 1836, this earned him an appointment as a professor of painting at the Accademia di Belle Arti di Bologna, succeeding Francesco Alberi, who had resigned. Two years later, he requested a transfer to his alma mater in Brera, where he accepted a less prestigious position as a professor of figure drawing, which he would hold until 1859. He later became an honorary member of the Accademia in Bologna and the Accademia di Belle Arti di Urbino.

During this time, he established himself as a popular portraitist. In 1840, he and Giovanni Servi created anatomical tables based on the drawings of Giacomo Bossi (1750–1804). He also provided illustrations for The Betrothed by Alessandro Manzoni. In addition to this, from the late 1840s through the 1850s, he took an interest in decorative painting, beginning with fresco cycles depicting the Glory of Saint Peter and the Four Major Prophets at the church of San Pietro al Rosario in Novara. This resulted in numerous commissions for frescoes from private clients. He also painted them at the church of Santa Chiara in Busnago, and on the ceiling in the Società del Giardino.

In 1850, he briefly held the Chair of painting, occupied by his former teacher Sabatelli, followed by a stint as Curator of its galleries. In 1855, he received several awards at the Exposition Universelle in Paris. He retired in 1859, but was recalled for the term of 1861–62.In 1870, he was awarded the Knight's Cross of the Order of Saints Maurice and Lazarus. He died in 1874 in Naples.

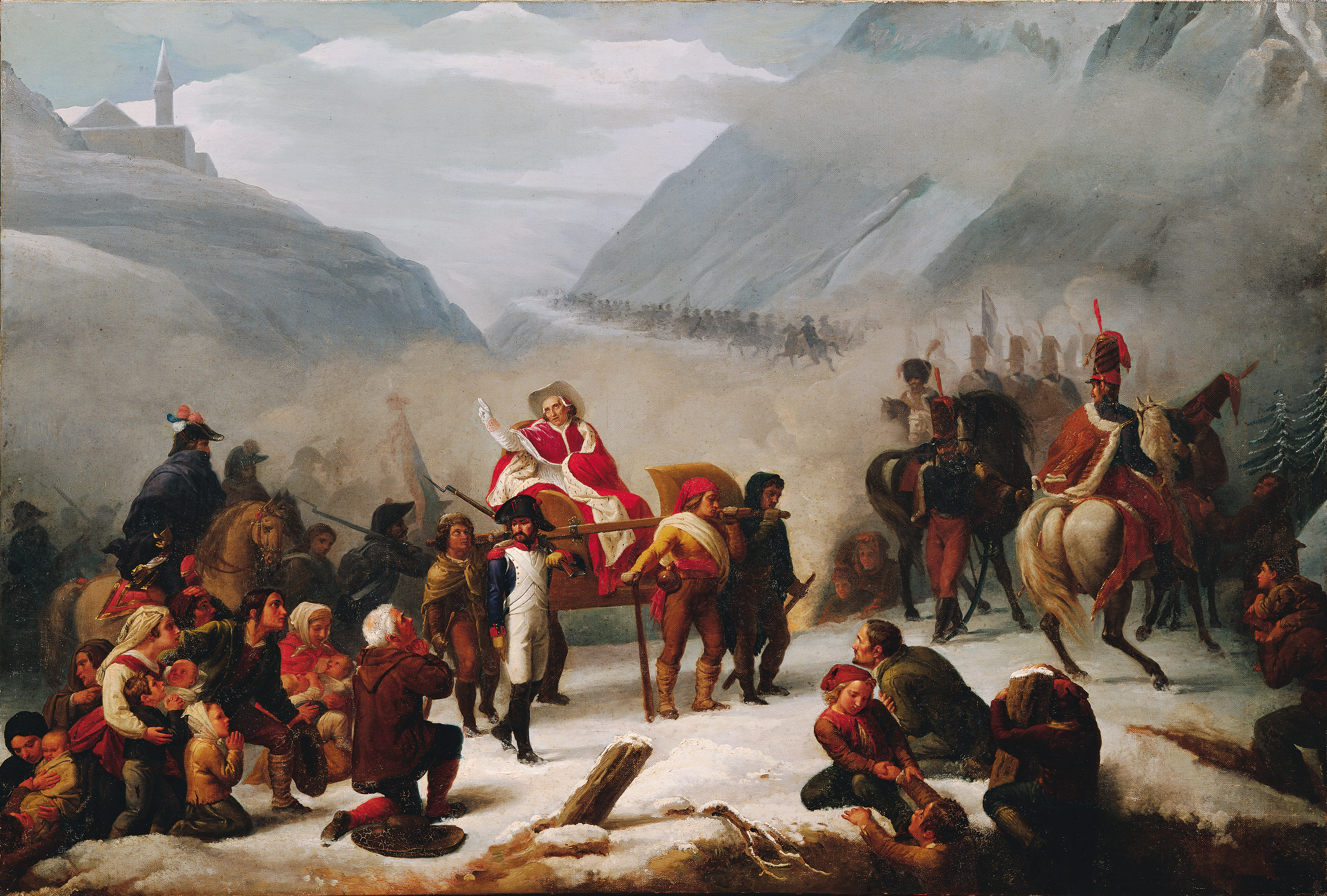
Pope Pius VII Crossing the Alps
