= Besazio =

- Former municipality
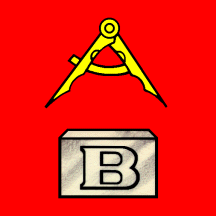
- Flag Coat of arms
- Location of Besazio
- Location within Switzerland Location within Canton of Ticino
- Coordinates: 45°52′N 8°57′E
- Country: Switzerland
- Canton: Ticino
- District: Mendrisio

Government
  - Mayor: Silvano Gaffuri

Area
  - Total: 0.88 km^{2} (0.34 sq mi)
- Elevation: 497 m (1,631 ft)

Population (Dec 2011)
  - Total: 618
  - Density: 700/km^{2} (1,800/sq mi)
- Time zone: UTC+01:00 (CET)
  - Summer (DST): UTC+02:00 (CEST)
- Postal code: 6863
- SFOS number: 5243
- ISO 3166 code: CH-TI
- Surrounded by: Arzo, Clivio (IT-VA), Ligornetto, Rancate, Tremona
- Website: besazio.ch

Besazio (Besasc in lombard) is a municipality in the district of Mendrisio in the canton of Ticino in Switzerland. On 14 April 2013, the former municipalities of Besazio, Ligornetto and Meride merged into the municipality of Mendrisio.

== History ==
Besazio was first mentioned in 1335 as Besatio. In 15th to 18th centuries, it was called Besaccio. A settlement in this area was first mentioned in 1254, but the area has been settled since ancient times, as Roman era and Early Middle Ages objects indicate. In 1335, it was mentioned as part of the Pieve of Riva San Vitale. It became the center of its own parish in 1579. The first parish church of St. Antonino dates from before that date, but the exact age is unknown. According to tradition, the bell tower is a converted signal tower, while the sacristy is a former guard-house. In 1654 parish church of S. Maria Immacolata was built in a central location. It was rebuilt at the end of the 18th century, and renovated in 1964.

The main sources of income of the inhabitants was agriculture and marble mining as well as emigration to work as bricklayers. The recent economic and population growth has gradually changed the municipality into a commuter town.

== Geography ==
Before the merger, Besazio had a total area of .9 km^{2} (0.35 mi^{2}). Of this area, 0.57 km^{2} (0.22 sq mi) or 64.8% is used for agricultural purposes, while 0.28 km^{2} (0.11 sq mi) or 31.8% is forested. Of the rest of the land, 0.19 km^{2} (0.073 sq mi) or 21.6% is settled (buildings or roads).

Of the built up area, housing and buildings made up 19.3% and transportation infrastructure made up 2.3%. Out of the forested land, 20.5% of the total land area is heavily forested and 11.4% is covered with orchards or small clusters of trees. Of the agricultural land, 20.5% is used for growing crops, while 25.0% is used for orchards or vine crops and 19.3% is used for alpine pastures.

The former municipality is located in the Mendrisio district to the west of Mendrisio.

== Coat of arms ==
The blazon of the municipal coat of arms is Gules a pair of compasses or in chief and in base a marble stone with a carved B proper. The stone and compass refer to the local marble quarry.

== Demographics ==
Besazio had a population (as of 2011) of 618. As of 2008, 8.8% of the population are resident foreign nationals. Over the last 10 years (1997–2007) the population has changed at a rate of 30.4%.

Most of the population (as of 2000) speaks Italian (86.4%), with German being second most common (10.2%) and French being third (1.4%). Of the Swiss national languages (as of 2000), 51 speak German, 7 people speak French, 433 people speak Italian. The remainder (10 people) speak another language.

As of 2008, the gender distribution of the population was 49.0% male and 51.0% female. The population was made up of 280 Swiss men (43.7% of the population), and 34 (5.3%) non-Swiss men. There were 299 Swiss women (46.6%), and 28 (4.4%) non-Swiss women.

In 2008 there were 4 live births to Swiss citizens and 1 birth to non-Swiss citizens, and in same time span there were 4 deaths of Swiss citizens and 1 non-Swiss citizen death. Ignoring immigration and emigration, the population of Swiss citizens remained the same while the foreign population remained the same. There was 1 Swiss woman who emigrated from Switzerland. At the same time, there was 1 non-Swiss man who emigrated from Switzerland to another country and 2 non-Swiss women who immigrated from another country to Switzerland. The total Swiss population change in 2008 (from all sources, including moves across municipal borders) was an increase of 4 and the non-Swiss population change was a decrease of 5 people. This represents a population growth rate of -0.2%.

The age distribution, as of 2009, in Besazio is; 60 children or 9.4% of the population are between 0 and 9 years old and 78 teenagers or 12.2% are between 10 and 19. Of the adult population, 50 people or 7.8% of the population are between 20 and 29 years old. 70 people or 10.9% are between 30 and 39, 120 people or 18.7% are between 40 and 49, and 84 people or 13.1% are between 50 and 59. The senior population distribution is 83 people or 12.9% of the population are between 60 and 69 years old, 60 people or 9.4% are between 70 and 79, there are 36 people or 5.6% who are over 80.

As of 2000, there were 209 private households in the municipality, and an average of 2.4 persons per household. In 2000 there were 146 single family homes (or 77.2% of the total) out of a total of 189 inhabited buildings. There were 36 multi-family buildings (19.0%), along with 4 multi-purpose buildings that were mostly used for housing (2.1%) and 3 other use buildings (commercial or industrial) that also had some housing (1.6%). Of the single family homes 6 were built before 1919, while 29 were built between 1990 and 2000. The greatest number of single family homes (33) were built between 1919 and 1945.

In 2000 there were 249 apartments in the municipality. The most common apartment size was 4 rooms of which there were 73. There were 12 single room apartments and 105 apartments with five or more rooms. Of these apartments, a total of 209 apartments (83.9% of the total) were permanently occupied, while 37 apartments (14.9%) were seasonally occupied and 3 apartments (1.2%) were empty. The vacancy rate for the municipality, in 2008, was 0%. As of 2007, the construction rate of new housing units was 1.6 new units per 1000 residents.

The historical population is given in the following chart:

== Politics ==
In the 2007 federal election the most popular party was the FDP which received 33.54% of the vote. The next three most popular parties were the SP (19.42%), the CVP (17.98%) and the Ticino League (13.2%). In the federal election, a total of 277 votes were cast, and the voter turnout was 59.7%.

In the 2007 Gran Consiglio election, there were a total of 453 registered voters in Besazio, of which 323 or 71.3% voted. 2 blank ballots and 2 null ballots were cast, leaving 319 valid ballots in the election. The most popular party was the PLRT which received 103 or 32.3% of the vote. The next three most popular parties were; the PS (with 54 or 16.9%), the SSI (with 43 or 13.5%) and the PPD+GenGiova (with 42 or 13.2%).

In the 2007 Consiglio di Stato election, 1 blank ballot and 1 null ballot was cast, leaving 321 valid ballots in the election. The most popular party was the PLRT which received 97 or 30.2% of the vote. The next three most popular parties were; the PS (with 65 or 20.2%), the LEGA (with 59 or 18.4%) and the PPD (with 41 or 12.8%).

== Economy ==
As of 2007, Besazio had an unemployment rate of 1.37%. As of 2005, there were 7 people employed in the primary economic sector and about 2 businesses involved in this sector. 101 people were employed in the secondary sector and there were 5 businesses in this sector. 50 people were employed in the tertiary sector, with 18 businesses in this sector. There were 228 residents of the municipality who were employed in some capacity, of which females made up 40.4% of the workforce.

In 2008's statistics the total number of full-time equivalent jobs was 89. The number of jobs in the primary sector was 8, all of which were in agriculture. The number of jobs in the secondary sector was 10 of which 4 or (40.0%) were in manufacturing and 6 (60.0%) were in construction. The number of jobs in the tertiary sector was 71. In the tertiary sector; 46 or 64.8% were in wholesale or retail sales or the repair of motor vehicles, 4 or 5.6% were in a hotel or restaurant, 3 or 4.2% were in the information industry, 5 or 7.0% were the insurance or financial industry, 9 or 12.7% were technical professionals or scientists, and 1 or 1.4% were in health care.

In 2000, there were 305 workers who commuted into the municipality and 191 workers who commuted away. The municipality is a net importer of workers, with about 1.6 workers entering the municipality for every one leaving. About 46.2% of the workforce coming into Besazio are coming from outside Switzerland. Of the working population, 7% used public transportation to get to work, and 71.5% used a private car.

== Religion ==
From the 2000 census, 413 or 82.4% were Roman Catholic, while 36 or 7.2% belonged to the Swiss Reformed Church. There are 41 individuals (or about 8.18% of the population) who belong to another church (not listed on the census), and 11 individuals (or about 2.20% of the population) did not answer the question.

== Education ==
The entire Swiss population is generally well educated. In Besazio about 79.6% of the population (between age 25-64) have completed either non-mandatory upper secondary education or additional higher education (either university or a Fachhochschule).

In Besazio there were a total of 107 students (as of 2009). The Ticino education system provides up to three years of non-mandatory kindergarten and in Besazio there were 17 children in kindergarten. The primary school program lasts for five years. In the municipality, 28 students attended the standard primary schools. In the lower secondary school system, students either attend a two-year middle school followed by a two-year pre-apprenticeship or they attend a four-year program to prepare for higher education. There were 31 students in the two-year middle school, while 20 students were in the four-year advanced program.

The upper secondary school includes several options, but at the end of the upper secondary program, a student will be prepared to enter a trade or to continue on to a university or college. In Ticino, vocational students may either attend school while working on their internship or apprenticeship (which takes three or four years) or may attend school followed by an internship or apprenticeship (which takes one year as a full-time student or one and a half to two years as a part-time student). There were 8 vocational students who were attending school full-time and 3 who attend part-time.

As of 2000, there were 3 students in Besazio who came from another municipality, while 76 residents attended schools outside the municipality.
