= Giuseppe Landriani =

Italian painter (1824–1894)

Giuseppe Landriani (1824–1894) was an Italian painter.

== Biography ==
He was a resident of Milan. He specialized in painting landscapes and genre paintings. Among his works: Cascinale, displayed at the 1883 Exhibition of Milan. At the 1884 Exhibition of Turin, he had sent: a mandria, and a Rustic home. At Milan, in 1886, he exhibited Sorpreso dalla bufera, and Pecore recalcitranti ricondotte all'orile. Among other major painting are: Pecore pascenti; La bufera; Di ritorno dalla fiera; and La famiglia della Maria. He was an honorary associate of the Royal Academy of Fine Arts in Milan.
