= Larry Lelli =

American drummer

- Born: Chicago, Illinois
- Origin: Eau Claire, Wisconsin
- Genres: Jazz, rock, Broadway, Latin, Country
- Occupation(s): Musician, writer, producer
- Instrument: Drums
- Website: larrylelli.com

Larry Lelli is an American freelance drummer, percussionist, conductor and producer.

== Early life ==
Growing up in small town Wisconsin, Lelli was drawn to drumming from a young age. "I'm one of those people who, for better or worse, are born with an innate passion for something. My passion happened to be drumming. So, the desire was always there, and my earliest memories are of me banging away on pots and pans or tabletops, or any other surface where I could make a sound." Lelli attended La Crosse Central High School where he became attracted to jazz music. He then graduated from the University of Wisconsin–Eau Claire in 1990 and subsequently moved to the Twin Cities where he played with local jazz groups around the city. Eventually, he moved to Nashville where he began making connections with big-name acts.

== Career ==
Lelli has performed and recorded with several musicians and musical groups including Melissa Etheridge, The Mamas & the Papas, Anika Noni Rose, Sebastian Bach, Vanessa L. Williams, Doug Stone, Heather Headley, Geoff Keezer, and trombonist Andre Stephani. Lelli is best known for his work with Broadway musicals. His resume includes about 30 different Broadway shows such as The Producers, Million Dollar Quartet, A Christmas Story, Come From Away, and Stephen Sondheim & John Weidman's Assassins. Lelli is an active educator, and presents masterclasses around the world specializing in approaches for performing on Broadway & musical theatre for Yamaha Drums & Sabian Cymbals. Lelli is also a writer, regularly contributing to the magazine Modern Drummer and other educational publications. Lelli is currently based in New York City.

== Style ==
Lelli is known for his versatility and has been called a "musical chameleon." He performs in Latin, jazz, classical, funk, country, Broadway, and rock styles. Lelli's ability to switch styles smoothly has led to him being a highly sought after musician in New York City. "[His versatility] is part of the reason he is one of the top-call freelance drummers in NYC." Lelli's ability to perform in many styles has also led to much work in film and television including several commercials.
