= Viggiù =

Viggiù Vigiǘu (Lombard)
- Comune
- Comune di Viggiù

- Location within Italy Location within Lombardy
- Coordinates: 45°52′N 8°54′E
- Country: Italy
- Region: Lombardy
- Province: Varese (VA)
- Frazioni: Baraggia

Government
  - Mayor: Emanuela Quintiglio

Area
  - Total: 9.26 km^{2} (3.58 sq mi)
- Elevation: 506 m (1,660 ft)

Population (28 February 2017)
  - Total: 5,300
  - Density: 570/km^{2} (1,500/sq mi)
- Demonym: Viggiutesi
- Time zone: UTC+1 (CET)
  - Summer (DST): UTC+2 (CEST)
- Postal code: 21059
- Dialing code: 0332
- Website: Official website

Viggiù (Italian: [vidˈdʒu]; Varesino: Vigiǘu [ʋiˈdʒyː]) is a comune (municipality) in the Province of Varese in the Italian region Lombardy, located about 50 kilometres (31 mi) northwest of Milan and about 8 kilometres (5 mi) northeast of Varese, on the border with Switzerland.

Viggiù borders the following municipalities: Arcisate, Besano, Bisuschio, Cantello, Clivio, Meride (Switzerland), Saltrio.

== Main sights ==
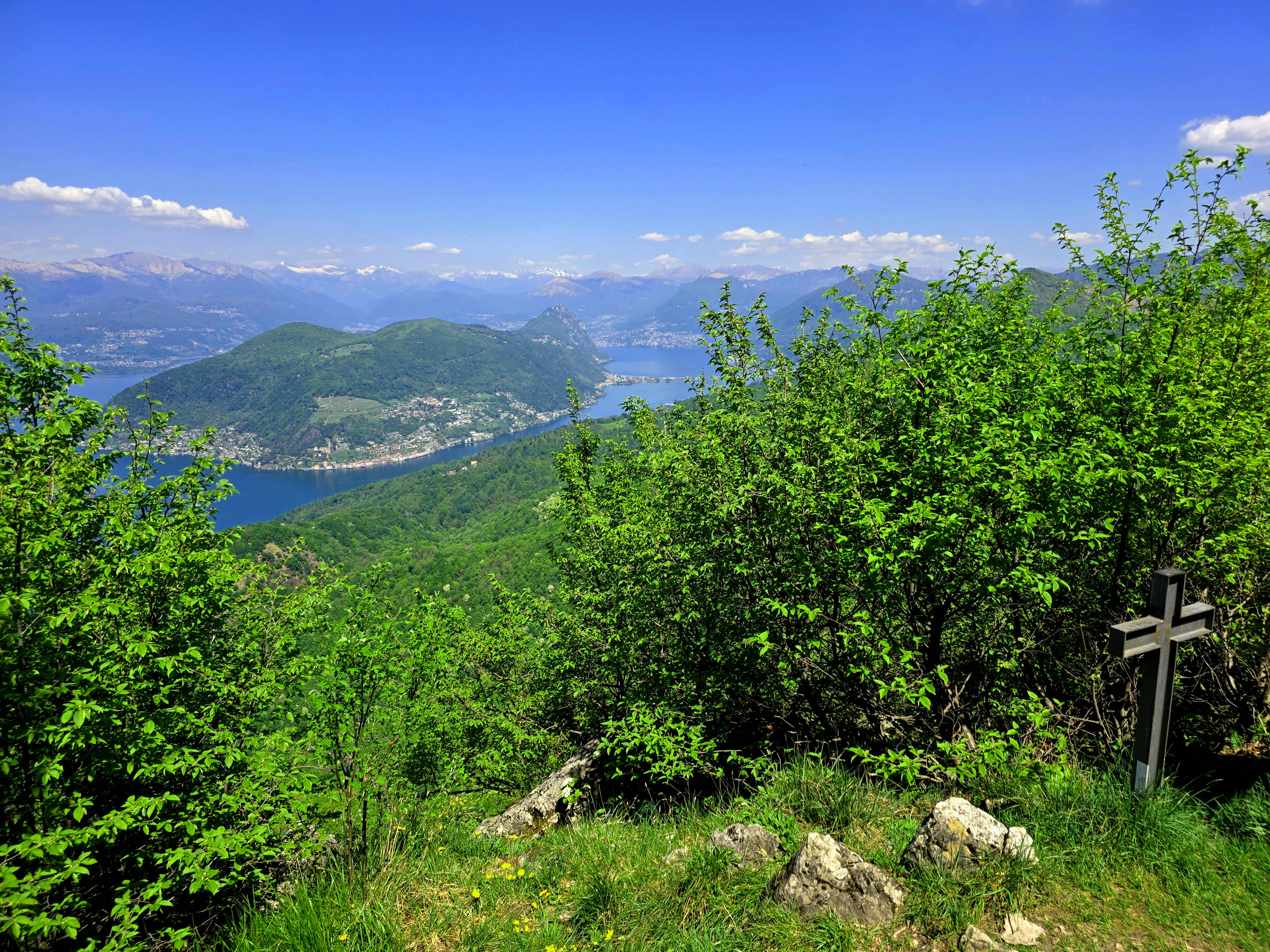
Lugano Lake from Monte Orsa

The church of Santo Stefano, in Romanesque style, was erected at the limit of a crown of houses, which constituted a large and high amphitheatre facing the Valceresio area. The church was enlarged in the 15th century to reach its current size, three wide aisles, divided into four bays, separated by six columns and surmounted by capitals.

== People ==
- Antonio Bottinelli, (1827–1898), sculptor
- Sandy Cane, (1961 - ), the first black mayor of Italy elected in June 2009
- Gianni Danzi (1940–2007), Roman Catholic Archbishop of the Territorial Prelature of Loreto
- Fausto Papetti, (1923–1999), saxophonist

== Twin towns ==
- (United States) Barre, USA
- San Fratello, Italy
