= Giovan Battista Lelli =

Italian painter (1828–1898)

Giovan Battista Lelli (1828 –1898) was an Italian painter.

He was born in San Giovanni Bianco, in the Province of Bergamo, and died in Milan. He painted alpine landscapes of the lake region of North Italy. He was influenced by Gerolamo Induno and Silvio Poma. He was prolific in his output. At Turin, in 1880, he displayed: Promontorio di Bellagio, Lago di Como and Pianura di Colico e Paese di San Maurizio; in 1881 at Milan: Promontorio di Bellagio; Mezzogiorno; Colico; in 1883 again in Milan: Val Menaggio; Lago delpiano; Lago dì Lugano; Strada da Bezzonico a Menaggio; Bosco di faggi vicino al Monte Rosa e Scala dietro al Castelio di Corenno. At Rome, in 1883, he exhibited Monte del Tonale presso Edolo in Val Camonica and Cara di granito nel Monte Orfano; in Turin, in 1884 and at Milan, in 1886, he displayed: Monte Orfano, Griante sopra Cadenabbia, Alto San Bernardo, and Un paese dei Grigioni.
