= Ligornetto =

- Former municipality
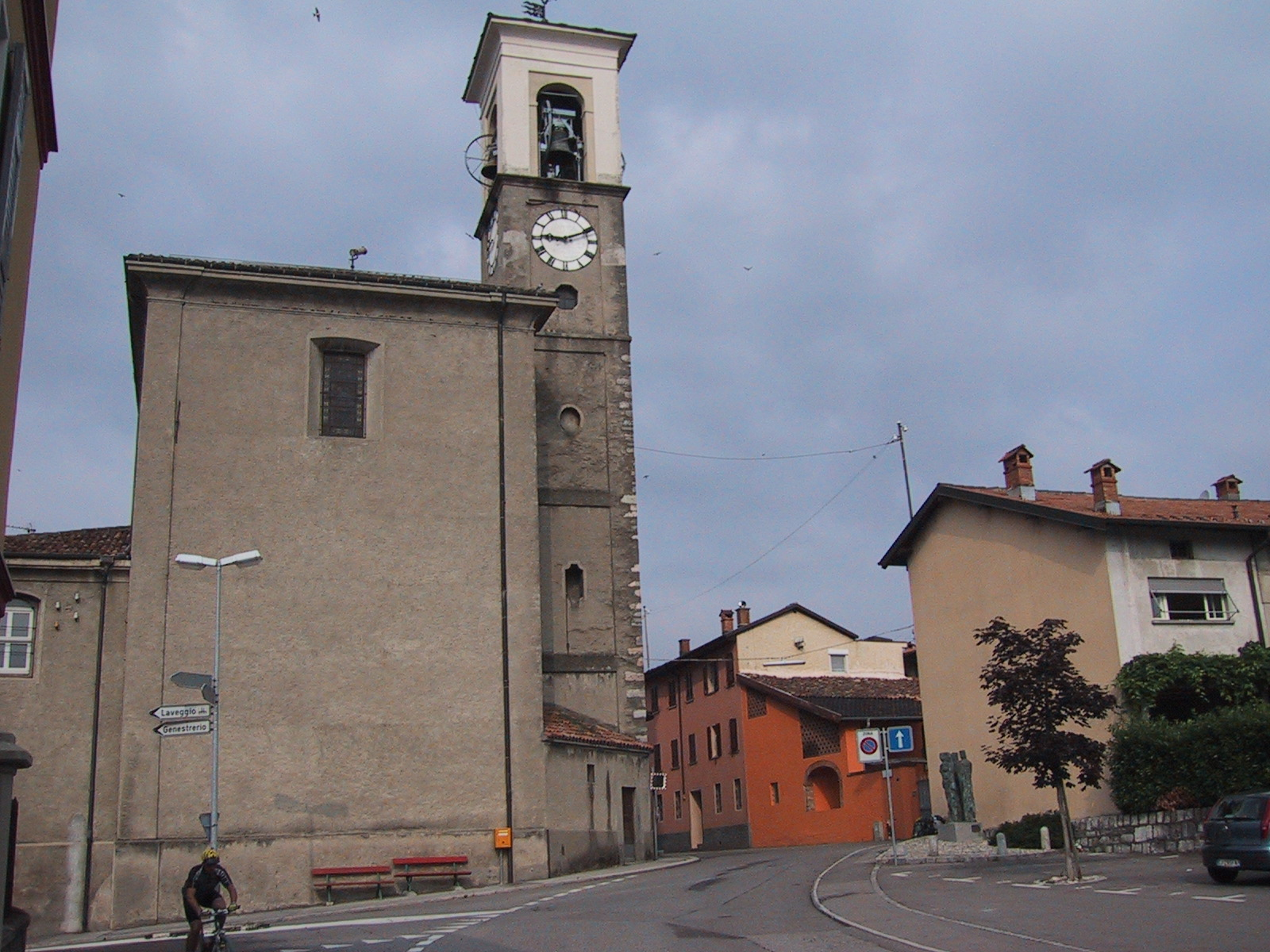

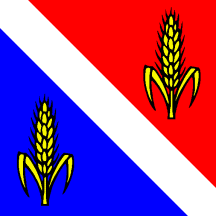
- Flag Coat of arms
- Location of Ligornetto
- Location within Switzerland Location within Canton of Ticino
- Coordinates: 45°52′N 8°56′E
- Country: Switzerland
- Canton: Ticino
- District: Mendrisio

Government
  - Mayor: Marco Pina

Area
  - Total: 2.02 km^{2} (0.78 sq mi)
- Elevation: 362 m (1,188 ft)

Population (Dec 2011)
  - Total: 1,716
  - Density: 850/km^{2} (2,200/sq mi)
- Time zone: UTC+01:00 (CET)
  - Summer (DST): UTC+02:00 (CEST)
- Postal code: 6853
- SFOS number: 5253
- ISO 3166 code: CH-TI
- Surrounded by: Besazio, Clivio (IT-VA), Genestrerio, Rancate, Stabio
- Website: ligornetto.ch

Ligornetto is a municipality in the district of Mendrisio in the canton of Ticino in Switzerland. On 14 April 2013 the former municipalities of Besazio, Ligornetto and Meride merged into the municipality of Mendrisio.

== History ==
Ligornetto is first mentioned in 789 as Logurno.

Roman era remains show that Ligornetto has been inhabited since ancient times. The village is mentioned in documents from the 8th, 9th, 12th and 13th centuries. The latter documents are in connection with farms and land that various institutions in Como owned in Ligornetto. It is mentioned in 1254 as a municipality.

Originally belonging to the Pieve of Balerna, in 1557 Ligornetto became an independent parish. The parish church of San Lorenzo has existed since the 13th century and was rebuilt in the 18th century. The modern Oratory of St. Joseph was mentioned in 844. It was originally consecrated to St. Maria.

In 1898, a museum dedicated to Vincenzo Vela opened in Ligornetto. The Swiss sculptor was originally from Ligornetto, and after his death, he left a bequest to his home town.

Traditionally, it was a small agricultural village that produced mainly grain and wine as well as silkworms and stone from a quarry. Other income came from the seasonal emigration of plasterers and masons. In recent decades, the village's character has been changing with the industrial expansion and an increasing number of cross-border workers. The population growth has led to construction of a number of new houses.

== Geography ==
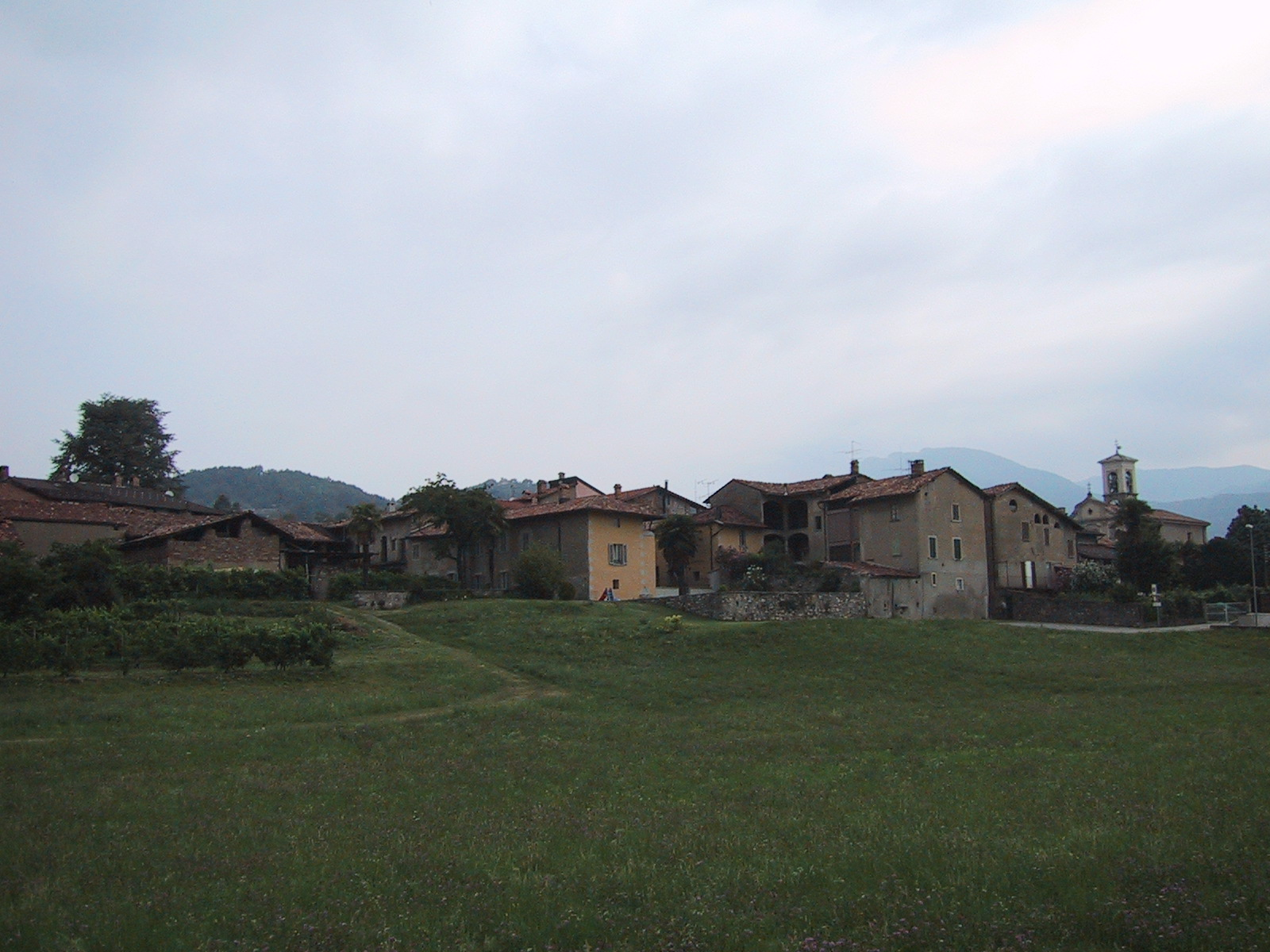
View of Ligornetto from the south

Aerial view (1946)

Before the merger, Ligornetto had a total area of 2.0 km^{2} (0.77 mi^{2}). Of this area, 1.19 km^{2} (0.46 sq mi) or 58.9% is used for agricultural purposes, while 0.45 km^{2} (0.17 sq mi) or 22.3% is forested. Of the rest of the land, 0.72 km^{2} (0.28 sq mi) or 35.6% is settled (buildings or roads) and 0.03 km^{2} (7.4 acres) or 1.5% is unproductive land.

Of the built up area, industrial buildings made up 2.0% of the total area while housing and buildings made up 17.8% and transportation infrastructure made up 10.4%. Power and water infrastructure as well as other special developed areas made up 3.5% of the area while parks, green belts and sports fields made up 2.0%. Out of the forested land, 16.3% of the total land area is heavily forested and 5.9% is covered with orchards or small clusters of trees. Of the agricultural land, 28.7% is used for growing crops, while 12.4% is used for orchards or vine crops and 17.8% is used for alpine pastures.

The former municipality is located in the Mendrisio district, near the Italian border.

== Coat of arms ==
The blazon of the municipal coat of arms is Per bend gules and azure a bend argent between two corn ears or.

== Demographics ==
Ligornetto had a population (as of 2011) of 1,716. As of 2008, 15.2% of the population are resident foreign nationals. Over the last 10 years (1997–2007) the population has changed at a rate of 18.2%.

Most of the population (as of 2000) speaks Italian (90.1%), with German being second most common (5.0%) and French being third (2.3%). Of the Swiss national languages (as of 2000), 70 speak German, 32 people speak French, 1,268 people speak Italian, and 1 person speaks Romansh. The remainder (37 people) speak another language.

As of 2008, the gender distribution of the population was 49.1% male and 50.9% female. The population was made up of 688 Swiss men (40.4% of the population), and 148 (8.7%) non-Swiss men. There were 762 Swiss women (44.8%), and 104 (6.1%) non-Swiss women.

In 2008 there were 20 live births to Swiss citizens and 2 births to non-Swiss citizens, and in same time span there were 7 deaths of Swiss citizens and 2 non-Swiss citizen deaths. Ignoring immigration and emigration, the population of Swiss citizens increased by 13 while the foreign population remained the same. There was 1 Swiss woman who immigrated back to Switzerland. At the same time, there were 8 non-Swiss men and 5 non-Swiss women who immigrated from another country to Switzerland. The total Swiss population change in 2008 (from all sources, including moves across municipal borders) was an increase of 15 and the non-Swiss population change was an increase of 31 people. This represents a population growth rate of 2.8%.

The age distribution, as of 2009, in Ligornetto is; 175 children or 10.3% of the population are between 0 and 9 years old and 192 teenagers or 11.3% are between 10 and 19. Of the adult population, 180 people or 10.6% of the population are between 20 and 29 years old. 242 people or 14.2% are between 30 and 39, 314 people or 18.4% are between 40 and 49, and 228 people or 13.4% are between 50 and 59. The senior population distribution is 178 people or 10.5% of the population are between 60 and 69 years old, 108 people or 6.3% are between 70 and 79, there are 85 people or 5.0% who are over 80.

As of 2000, there were 571 private households in the municipality, and an average of 2.5 persons per household. In 2000 there were 268 single family homes (or 67.3% of the total) out of a total of 398 inhabited buildings. There were 110 multi-family buildings (27.6%), along with 5 multi-purpose buildings that were mostly used for housing (1.3%) and 15 other use buildings (commercial or industrial) that also had some housing (3.8%). Of the single family homes 14 were built before 1919, while 35 were built between 1990 and 2000. The greatest number of single family homes (77) were built between 1919 and 1945.

In 2000 there were 648 apartments in the municipality. The most common apartment size was 4 rooms of which there were 204. There were 15 single room apartments and 210 apartments with five or more rooms. Of these apartments, a total of 571 apartments (88.1% of the total) were permanently occupied, while 66 apartments (10.2%) were seasonally occupied and 11 apartments (1.7%) were empty. The vacancy rate for the municipality, in 2008, was 0.14%. As of 2007, the construction rate of new housing units was 5.6 new units per 1000 residents.

The historical population is given in the following chart:

== Heritage sites of national significance ==
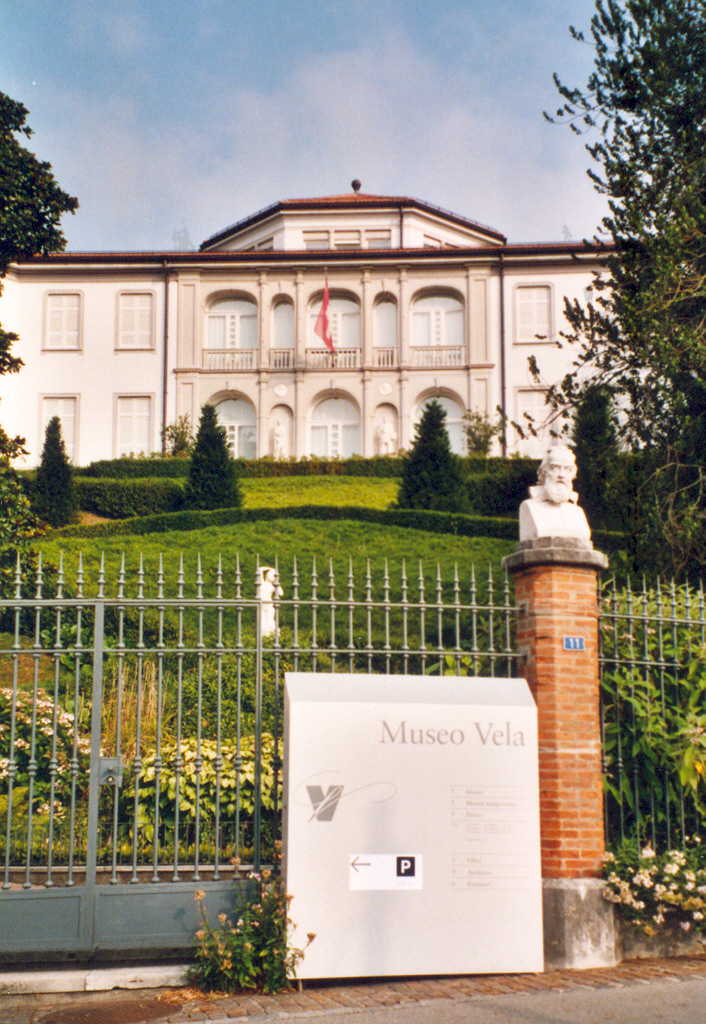
Museo Vela

The Museo Vincenzo Vela is listed as a Swiss heritage site of national significance. The entire village of Ligornetto is listed in the Inventory of Swiss Heritage Sites.

== Politics ==
In the 2007 federal election the most popular party was the CVP which received 31.07% of the vote. The next three most popular parties were the FDP (23.54%), the SP (18.33%) and the Ticino League (12.75%). In the federal election, a total of 605 votes were cast, and the voter turnout was 49.2%.

In the 2007 Gran Consiglio election, there were a total of 1,232 registered voters in Ligornetto, of which 803 or 65.2% voted. 8 blank ballots and 3 null ballots were cast, leaving 792 valid ballots in the election. The most popular party was the PPD+GenGiova which received 205 or 25.9% of the vote. The next three most popular parties were; the PLRT (with 176 or 22.2%), the PS (with 133 or 16.8%) and the SSI (with 116 or 14.6%).

In the 2007 Consiglio di Stato election, 8 blank ballots and 4 null ballots were cast, leaving 791 valid ballots in the election. The most popular party was the PPD which received 196 or 24.8% of the vote. The next three most popular parties were; the PLRT (with 175 or 22.1%), the PS (with 157 or 19.8%) and the LEGA (with 121 or 15.3%).

== Economy ==
As of 2007, Ligornetto had an unemployment rate of 3.17%. As of 2005, there were 56 people employed in the primary economic sector and about 11 businesses involved in this sector. 265 people were employed in the secondary sector and there were 17 businesses in this sector. 201 people were employed in the tertiary sector, with 41 businesses in this sector. There were 663 residents of the municipality who were employed in some capacity, of which females made up 42.2% of the workforce.

In 2008 the total number of full-time equivalent jobs was 426. The number of jobs in the primary sector was 27, all of which were in agriculture. The number of jobs in the secondary sector was 235, of which 194 or (82.6%) were in manufacturing and 41 (17.4%) were in construction. The number of jobs in the tertiary sector was 164. In the tertiary sector; 29 or 17.7% were in wholesale or retail sales or the repair of motor vehicles, 32 or 19.5% were in the movement and storage of goods, 32 or 19.5% were in a hotel or restaurant, 1 or 0.6% were in the information industry, 9 or 5.5% were the insurance or financial industry, 5 or 3.0% were technical professionals or scientists, 8 or 4.9% were in education and 14 or 8.5% were in health care.

In 2000, there were 645 workers who commuted into the municipality and 534 workers who commuted away. The municipality is a net importer of workers, with about 1.2 workers entering the municipality for every one leaving. About 37.7% of the workforce coming into Ligornetto are coming from outside Switzerland, while 0.7% of the locals commute out of Switzerland for work. Of the working population, 4.8% used public transportation to get to work, and 73.9% used a private car.

== Religion ==
From the 2000 census, 1,168 or 83.0% were Roman Catholic, while 65 or 4.6% belonged to the Swiss Reformed Church. There are 135 individuals (or about 9.59% of the population) who belong to another church (not listed on the census), and 40 individuals (or about 2.84% of the population) did not answer the question.

== Education ==
The entire Swiss population is generally well educated. In Ligornetto about 74.2% of the population (between age 25–64) have completed either non-mandatory upper secondary education or additional higher education (either university or a Fachhochschule).

In Ligornetto there were a total of 305 students (as of 2009). The Ticino education system provides up to three years of non-mandatory kindergarten and in Ligornetto there were 44 children in kindergarten. The primary school program lasts for five years and includes both a standard school and a special school. In the municipality, 105 students attended the standard primary schools and 3 students attended the special school. In the lower secondary school system, students either attend a two-year middle school followed by a two-year pre-apprenticeship or they attend a four-year program to prepare for higher education. There were 76 students in the two-year middle school, while 32 students were in the four-year advanced program.

The upper secondary school includes several options, but at the end of the upper secondary program, a student will be prepared to enter a trade or to continue on to a university or college. In Ticino, vocational students may either attend school while working on their internship or apprenticeship (which takes three or four years) or may attend school followed by an internship or apprenticeship (which takes one year as a full-time student or one and a half to two years as a part-time student). There were 21 vocational students who were attending school full-time and 21 who attend part-time.

The professional program lasts three years and prepares a student for a job in engineering, nursing, computer science, business, tourism and similar fields. There were 3 students in the professional program.

As of 2000, there were 3 students in Ligornetto who came from another municipality, while 124 residents attended schools outside the municipality.
