= Waldensian Evangelical Church (Bordighera) =

Coordinates: 43°46′54.30″N 7°39′42.16″E

- (Chiesa valdese)
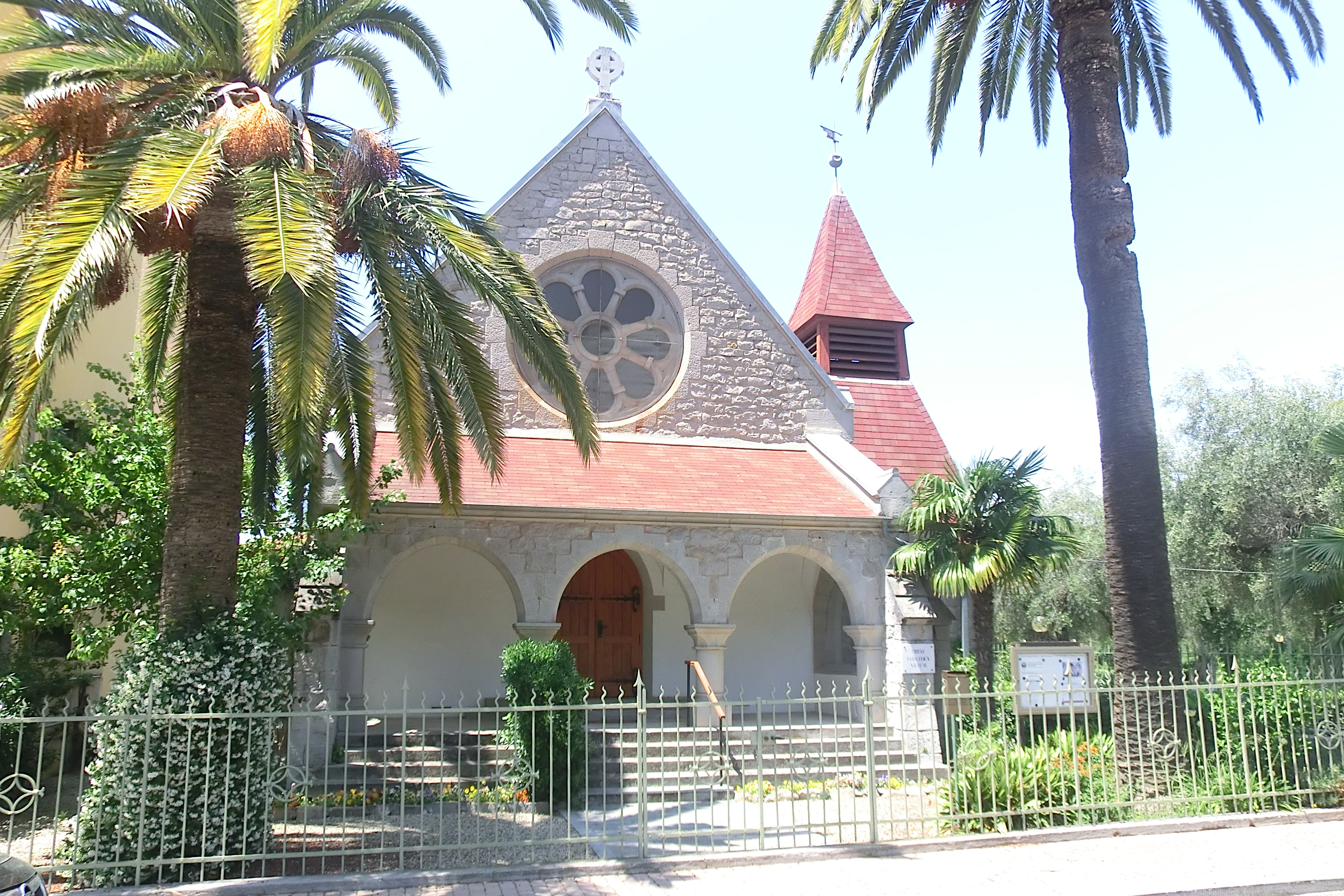
- Façade of the Church.

Religion
- Affiliation: Waldensian Church
- Province: Imperia
- Year consecrated: 1904
- Status: Active

Location
- Location: Bordighera, Italy
- Interactive map of Waldensian Evangelical Church (Bordighera)

Architecture
- Architect: Rudolph Winter
- Type: Church
- Style: Gothic

The Waldensian Evangelical Church is a religious building in Via Vittorio Veneto in Bordighera on the Riviera, province of Imperia.

== History and description ==
In the nineteenth and twentieth century, Bordighera was visited by many British citizens, then followed by guests of other nationalities including Germans. Among the most famous guests were Empress Victoria, wife of Frederick III, German Emperor, who stayed at the Hotel Angst, Baron Friederich von Kleudgen that will eventually settle in the famous Villa Banana which he built, Baron Raphaël Bischoffsheim, the painter Hermann Nestel and the botanist Ludwig Winter.

The Anglicans built their church in 1873 but Protestants continued to be lack a place of worship. In response Baron Moritz von Bernus organized a fundraiser to build a place of worship suitable for Protestants who resided in Bordighera. In 1901 the Baron, with the help of an association of Frankfurt, purchased land in via Bischoffsheim, now Via Vittorio Veneto, to build an Evangelical church, which was inaugurated on March 20, 1904. The church was built by Rudolph Winter, third son of the famous German botanist Ludwig Winter.

The intent of the founders was that the building should not be reserved for the German Lutheran religion. It was therefore made available to believers of other nationalities and denominations.

In 1941, the Waldensian Evangelical Church became the owner of the building and continues with its ecumenical policy. Today the church building is also used for conferences and concerts organized in collaboration with the city of Bordighera.
