= Winter Gardens (Bordighera) =

- Giardini Winter
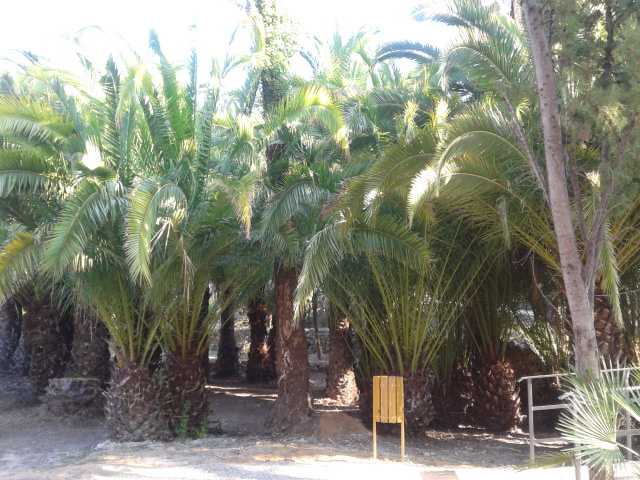
- Palm trees in the Winter Gardens
- Interactive map of Winter Gardens
- Location: via Ludovico Winter 6
- Nearest city: Bordighera, Italy
- Coordinates: 43.7855°N 7.6799°E
- Created: Ludwig Winter
- Designation: Public gardens

The Winter Gardens (Italian: Giardini Winter) were created by the German botanist Ludwig Winter and they are located at 6, Via Ludovico Winter in Bordighera, Liguria, Italy.

== History ==
On 17 May 2015, after being long abandoned, the Winter gardens were reopened to the public. Winter was a passionate botanist and had already made its reputation by collaborating on the Hanbury Gardens. Enchanted by the place and the climate suited to the development of the flora, he decided to settle in Bordighera and create his own botanical gardens. These gardens are particularly famous. They are now part of a private property located close to the Pallanca exotic gardens (via Madonna of the wheel 28). From the road you can still see the famous pergola which is portrayed in various photos and postcards. These gardens incorporated the famous twelve palms of Madonna della Ruota, celebrated by Scheffel in his poem of 1856, entitled "Near Death" and also painted by Hermann Nestel and Friederich von Kleudgen.

In 1877, Ludwig Winter, also created a plant nursery of several thousand square meters between the Arziglia, the old Bordighera fisherman's beach, and the Valley of the Sasso river. Winter had chosen this place because it was already a large palm grove, which was developed in part on terraces contained by stone walls, and in part closer to the coast. The German botanist loved the palm trees and quickly became one of the greatest experts for the acclimatization, the propagation and the transplanting of large specimens. The most important varieties in the gardens were the Phoenix dactylifera, Phoenix canariensis, Phoenix reclined Jubaea chilensis, Livistona australis, etc., but there were more than 60 varieties of palm trees and plants esotiche. The gardens had as their main function to allow exotic plants to acclimatize for then being multiplied and sold. However, the gardens also had a display function. The land was divided into large flower beds that allowed Winter to present its customers with the concepts he might have implanted in their own gardens.

Winter also had the idea of valorising a local tradition, the transformation of palm leaves in decorative items and baskets. He worked with local craftsmen to create new objects such as boxes, carpets, cover pots, magazine racks, etc. Still today in Bordighera, on the occasion of Palm Sunday, palmureli, made of woven palm leaves are distributed.

Winter, who was always looking for new ways to enhance the local heritage, also decided to open a major shop of plants and flowers in via Vittorio Emanuele, close to the Church of the Immaculate Conception or Terrasanta. This shop, which attracted customers from all over the Riviera and was particularly liked by Empress Victoria, wife of Frederick III, who often came to Bordighera.

== Trivia ==
- Winter also gave a major boost to the cultivation of flowers for the production of perfumes, including mimosa, jasmine, lily of the valley, orange blossom and especially the famous Taggia violets. This resulted in the development of distilleries to extract the “mother liquor" which was then sent to Grasse for its transformation in perfume. The most famous example of this development of floriculture for the perfume industry was the birth of the store 'Myres Andracco' , opened by Silvio Andracco, which thanks to its fragrances as "Mimosa Myres," "Brezzamarina" and "Oro di Seborga" had become very popular also in France.
- On 17 January 1954, the city of Bordighera inaugurated a bust in honor of Ludwig Winter in the gardens which are located behind the city hall and next to the Cape esplanade. The statue is the work of local sculptor Vigilo Audacia. The presence of the bust next to the Cape with its pines, may cause some to erroneously call the pine forest the Winter gardens.

== Photo gallery ==
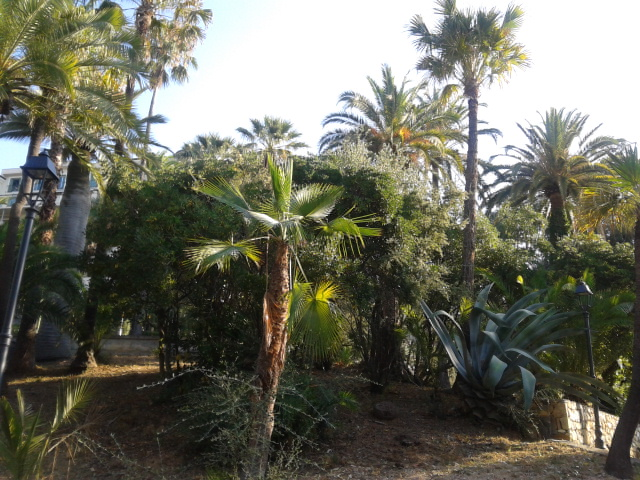
Winter gardens 2

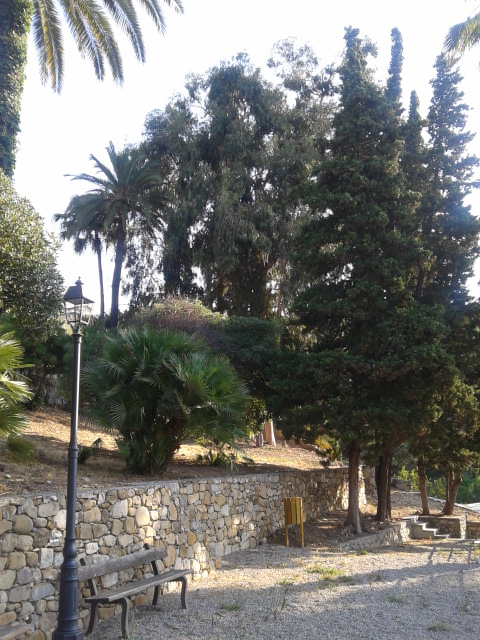
Winter gardens 3

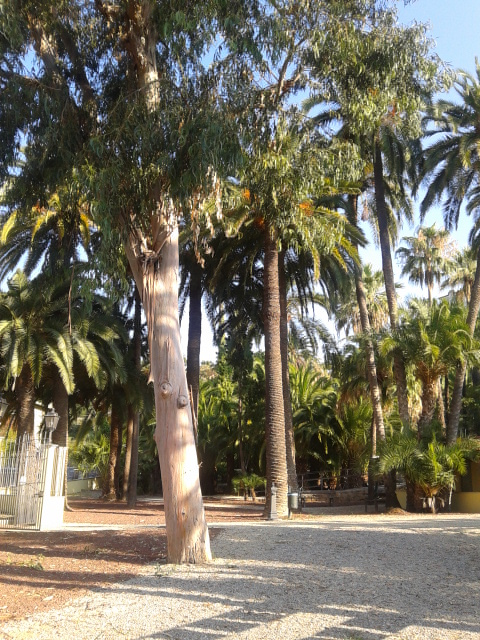
Winter gardens 4

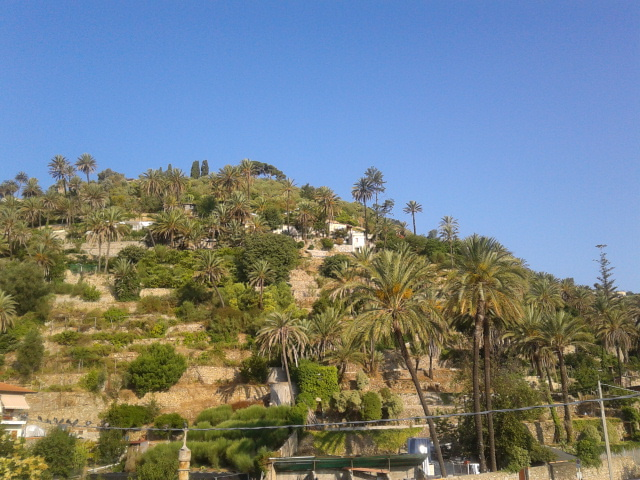
Entry to the Sasso valley
