= Villa Margherita, Bordighera =

Museum of Bordighera, Italy

Coordinates: 43.7830°N 7.6685°E

Villa Margherita (Bordighera)
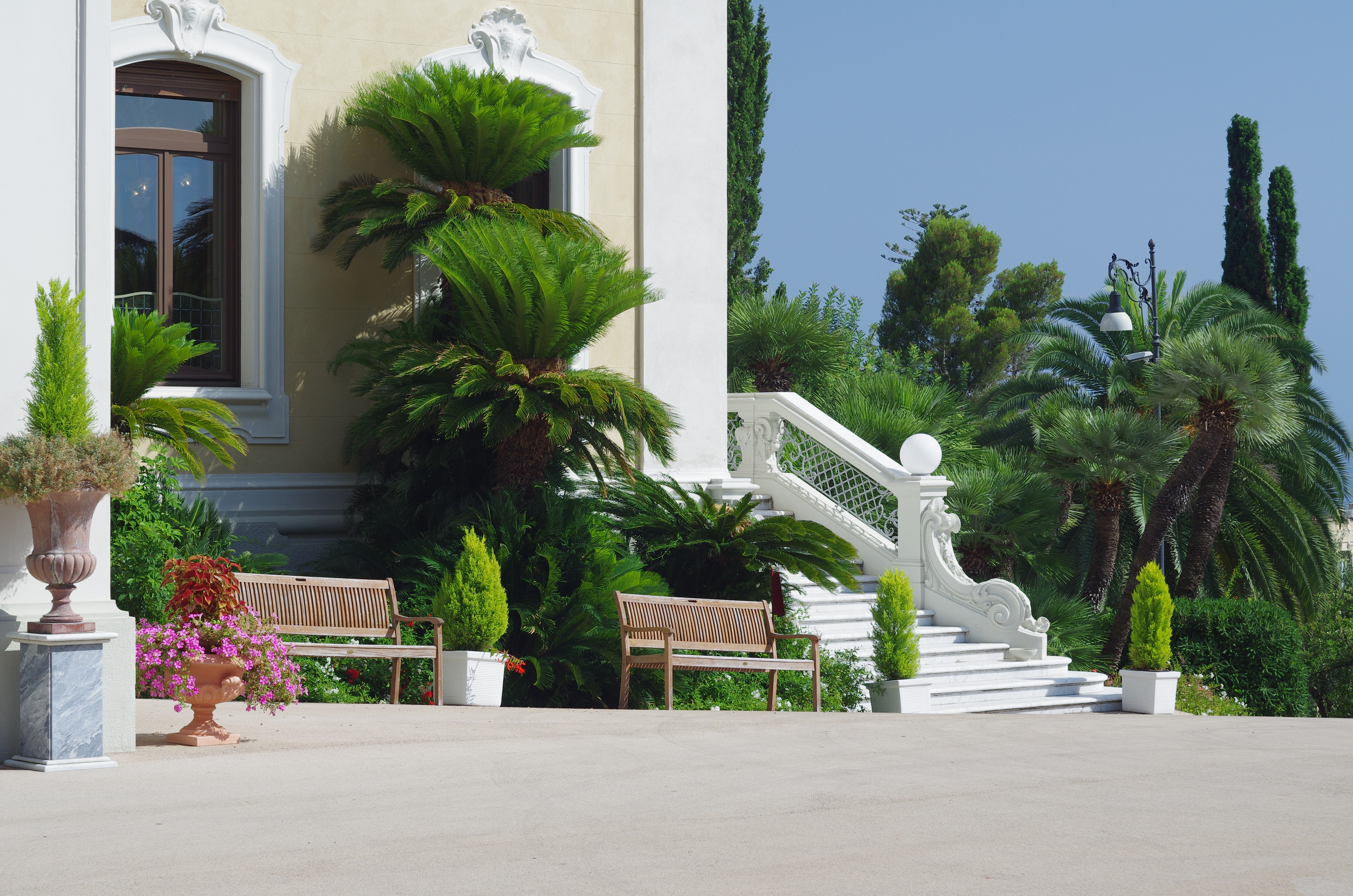
- Villa Margherita (Bordighera)
- Interactive map of the Villa Margherita (Bordighera) area

General information
- Location: Bordighera, Italy
- Construction started: March 1914
- Completed: October 1915
- Client: Margherita of Savoy

Design and construction
- Architect: Luigi Broggi
- Designations: Soprintendenze per i Beni Architettonici e Paesaggistici della Liguria

The Villa Regina Margherita di Savoia is a museum site on the via Romana of Bordighera in Riviera in province of Imperia.

The villa was the private residence of the Queen Margherita of Savoy who often stayed in Bordighera and in Liguria. The building is part of the property protected by the Superintendent of Ministry of Cultural Heritage and Activities and Tourism (Italy).

== History ==
Queen Margherita of Savoy arrived for the first time in Bordighera in September 1879, a guest at the Villa Etelinda. The queen had been badly shaken after the attack that king Umberto I of Italy had suffered in Naples on 17 November 1878 and was having a hard time recovering. To fortify her, the doctors had recommended the Riviera and Bordighera. In January 1880, she returned to Rome, but the stay in Bordighera was so pleasant that the queen returned there several times, staying at the Hôtel Cap which was in Virgilio street, not far from Villa Etelinda. The hotel, which was considered among the most beautiful in the area, was on the side of the hill and enjoyed a splendid view.

In 1914, the Queen bought Villa Bischoffsheim, which had meanwhile become villa Etelinda, the new owner, Lord Claude Bowes-Lyon, 14th Earl of Strathmore and Kinghorne. Villa Etelinda had a huge park, and it was in this park that the queen had built her new house. Works began on 30 March 1914, under the direction of the Italian architect Luigi Broggi, the Queen assigned the design and creation of the gardens to the Prussian landscape designer Ludwig Winter assisted by the Belgium hydraulic engineer Paul-Vincent Levieux.

The villa, built in the baroque style of the eighteenth century, has a basement, a ground floor, two upper floors, and a large terrace on the top floor, from which a walkway gives access to the upper garden.

In the basement, Broggi provided for the local staff services such as ironing, laundry, etc. and technical areas with the boiler and the engine for the elevator. The ground floor includes the hall, the audience hall, the library, the room for the reception and the dining room. The entrance leads through a small door, to the private chapel of the queen.

A massive staircase, lightened by three large windows, leads to the upper floors. The stained glass, still original, is decorated with the double royal coat of arms of Queen Margaret and King Umberto I of Italy, both of Savoy.

On the first floor is the apartment of the queen, composed of a hall, an office, a private room, and a bathroom. Also on the first floor, Broggi had designed three smaller apartments, one for the Lady of the service of the queen and the other for the royal family. On the second floor there was the private apartment of the Lady of the palace, Countess Maria Cristina Pes, the First Gentleman of the Queen, Prince Emilio Barbiano di Belgioioso d'Este, and rooms for guests.

The furniture and original fittings are almost all gone. The windows are still noteworthy, as are decorations over the doors, which represent the Savoy residences most loved by the queen, such as: Palazzo Margherita in Rome, the Savoy Castle in Gressoney-Saint-Jean and the Palazzina di caccia of Stupinigi.

Architect Broggi had equipped the villa with all the comforts of the time, such as an elevator and individual bathrooms for each room. Unfortunately, following a refurbishment, it was decided to retain only the bathroom of the queen. The lift was renovated and replaced for security reasons, but the original cabin, which has been restored, has been preserved and placed next to the dining room.

At the end of October 1915 works were completed and the villa was inaugurated on 25 February 1916. From that moment the queen spent several months each year in Bordighera, usually from May to December. Queen Margherita of Savoy died in Bordighera on 4 January 1926, aged 74. The day after her death, the body was brought to the station and put on the train to be moved to Rome, where she was buried in the Pantheon.

The House of Savoy decided to donate the house to the National Association of Families of Fallen and Missing in War. On 16 September 2008, the city of Bordighera and the Province of Imperia bought the villa.

Over about a two-year period, Villa Margherita was restored thanks to the intervention of the Terruzzi Foundation. The villa houses a private collection assembled by the Milanese tycoon Angelo Guido Terruzzi.

== Trivia ==
Queen Margherita loved art and literature and had invited many artists to Bordighera both in the Villa and in the Cap Hotel, when she was staying there. Among them we can mention: Pompeo Mariani, who was already living in Bordighera, Giosué Carducci, Antonio Fogazzaro, Salvatore Gotta and Riccardo Zanella. In 1922 the painter Vittorio Matteo Corcos was a guest of the queen and painted her portrait.

In April 1925, prince Umberto II of Italy and Princess Marie José of Belgium spent a few days in the Villa. Their first meeting took place in 1916 at the castle of Lispida to Battaglia Terme, in Veneto.

On 4 April 1940, the city inaugurated opened in honour to the queen, a white marble statue by the sculptor Italo Griselli (1880–1950). The statue is located at the foot of the pine forest of the Cape, a short distance from the Church Sant'Ampelio.

In 2012 the Terruzzi family, through the Foundation Anna Fiamma Terruzzi funded entirely the temporary exhibition "A view of the twentieth century", a gallery of works by great artists of the twentieth century such as Giorgio de Chirico, Giacomo Balla, Lucio Fontana, Felice Casorati, Ligabue, Gino Severini and many others.
