= Giuseppe Balbo =

Italian painter

- Born: Giuseppe Balbo; 1 August 1902; Bordighera, Italy
- Died: 26 December 1980 (aged 78); Ventimiglia, Italy
- Known for: Painter, sculptor
- Notable work: "Il soldato", "Self portrait"
- Movement: Post-Impressionism, futurism
- Patrons: Andrea Marchisio

Giuseppe Balbo (August 1, 1902 in Bordighera – December 26, 1980 in Ventimiglia) was an Italian painter.

== Biography ==
Balbo was always attracted by the "magical world of painting". At age 14 in Sanremo he met the Pasquali brothers who introduced him to the world of sculpture. Being born in Bordighera he was interested in the artistic production of all painters who lived and worked in his hometown such as Claude Monet, Pompeo Mariani Friederich von Kleudgen, Hermann Nestel, Giuseppe Ferdinando Piana, etc.

To improve his training he attended the Accademia Albertina of Turin and he had as professor Andrea Marchisio. His original style was heavily influenced by the Impressionism, although showing some elements of cubism. In 1924 he painted "Il soldato", confirming his membership in the futurism movement.

In 1926 he was commissioned to create a painting for the Church of the Immaculate Conception or Terrasanta of Bordighera, entitled "Death of Saint Joseph". In those years, he met the sculptor Adolfo Wildt who had a very large impact on his painting. This influence can be perceived in his famous portrait on yellow background.

Between 1931 and 1946 Balbo lived mainly in Africa, with a short stay in Italy and Paris, where he exhibited in 1938. In 1941 he was taken prisoner by the British in Kenya, and he learned English on this occasion. He returned in Bordighera only in 1946. After returning to his hometown he opened his workshop in Via Vittorio Emanuele 61 and after some time, in the same premises, an art school for "Sunday painters".

In 1947, on the occasion of the return of the relics of Sant'Ampelio a Bordighera, he was commissioned to create a wax statue to contain the relics of the saint. This statue is still visible in the left nave of the St. Mary Magdalene Church.

In 1950, he founded the painting prize "5 Bettole" and in 1952 he organized the first European exhibition of Pollock, Arshile Gorky, Man Ray with the works of Guggenheim Museum. Peggy Guggenheim spentwill spend a few days in Bordighera on the occasion of the exhibition.

He died in Ventimiglia on 26 December 1980. His ashes are kept in the cemetery of Bordighera.

== Giuseppe Balbo’s initiatives ==
In 1950 he created the painting prize "5 Bettole", which was also associated later to a literary prize. In 1951 he obtained from the municipality, a room in the Palazzo del Parco for a small school which then became a more ambitious project, the "Accademia Riviera" to which his name will be added later. On the occasion of renovations of the Palazzo del Parco in 1970, the academy moved to Ventimiglia in via Hanbury, but was then back to Bordighera in 1971.

== Photo gallery ==
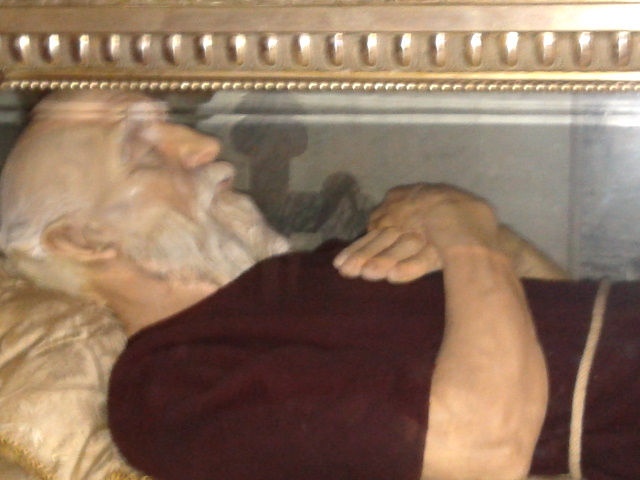
Wax statue with the relics of Sant'Ampelio, Church of St. Mary Magdalen (Bordighera)

== Bibliography ==
- "Jean Cocteau, Peggy Guggenheim e le mostre di pittura americana a Bordighera 1952-1957" by Leo Lecci, De Ferrari Editore (2004), 128 pp. with Cd-Rom. ASIN: B00EGMIOTW
