= Lowe Gardens =

Garden in Italy

Coordinates: 43.782258°N 7.661571°E

- I Giardini Lowe
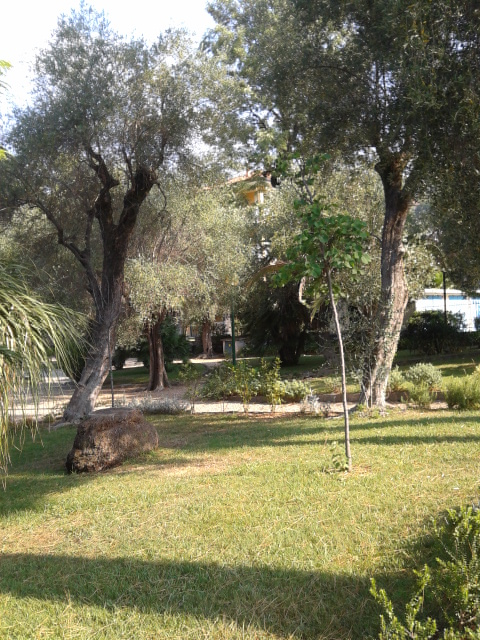
- Giardini Lowe
- Interactive map of Lowe Gardens
- Location: via Vittorio Veneto, 54
- Nearest city: Bordighera, Italy
- Created: Charles Henry Lowe
- Designation: Public gardens

The Lowe gardens are located at 54 Via Vittorio Veneto, in Bordighera, Liguria.

== History ==
The Lowe gardens are one of the many British gifts to a city many of them like and visit regularly. April 26, 1902, Charles Henry Lowe gave these gardens to the city, with a precise goal: "... to promote the leisure of the people in old age and fragile health". The gardens contain more than 60 ancient olive trees, as well as a very old Stone pine, a Grevillea robusta and numerous palms including a Butia capitata. The gardens are almost unchanged from the act of donation, except for the construction of a platform that allows the organisation of open-air concerts in the summer.

Charles Henry Lowe also donated to the city the land to build a small theatre, the Victoria Hall, which was also used to host exhibitions, such as one that remained famous in Bordighera of Hermann Nestel. The building has now been converted into a private residence and is located at 40 Via Vittorio Veneto.

However, the first gift of Lowe to the city was the Lawn Tennis Club, officially recognized as the oldest in Italy, because it was built in 1878, only a year after the Wimbledon lawns. A commemorative plaque, placed on the older court, honours the arrival of the "magic box" of Major Walter Clopton Wingfield which included: a net, two rackets and four tennis balls. Charles Henry Lowe was the first president of the club.

In the beginnings, tennis was seen as a playful moment waiting for teatime. However, rapidly, the game of tennis became popular and the Tennis Club of Bordighera turned into one of the most competitive of the Riviera, even surpassing the one form Monaco. In addition to the club, the "Sirt" (standing for Società Italiana Racchette Tennis) racket factory was established in 1901. The rackets were manufactured in via Roberto, a stone's throw from the club. This period of glory, however, ended with fascism and the Second World War, when many of the club members died or left permanently. The club was bombed and only 3 courts of the original 15 were left.

The Lawn Tennis Club of Bordighera still exists today, it counts 6 courts and is located at 15 Via Antonio Stoppani, a few meters from the Lowe Gardens and the Victoria Hall.

== Gallery ==
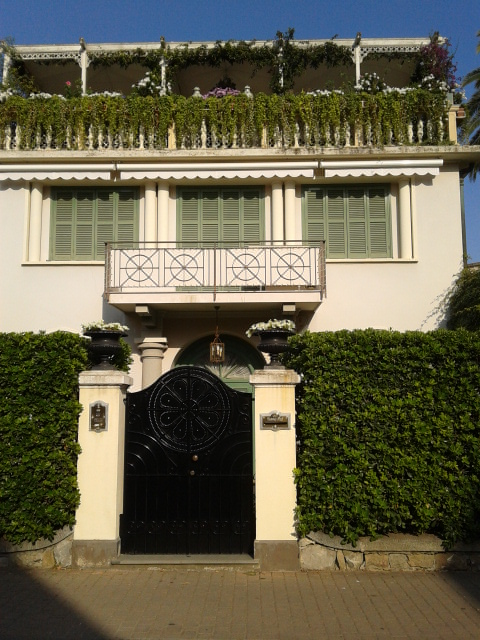
Victoria Hall, facade

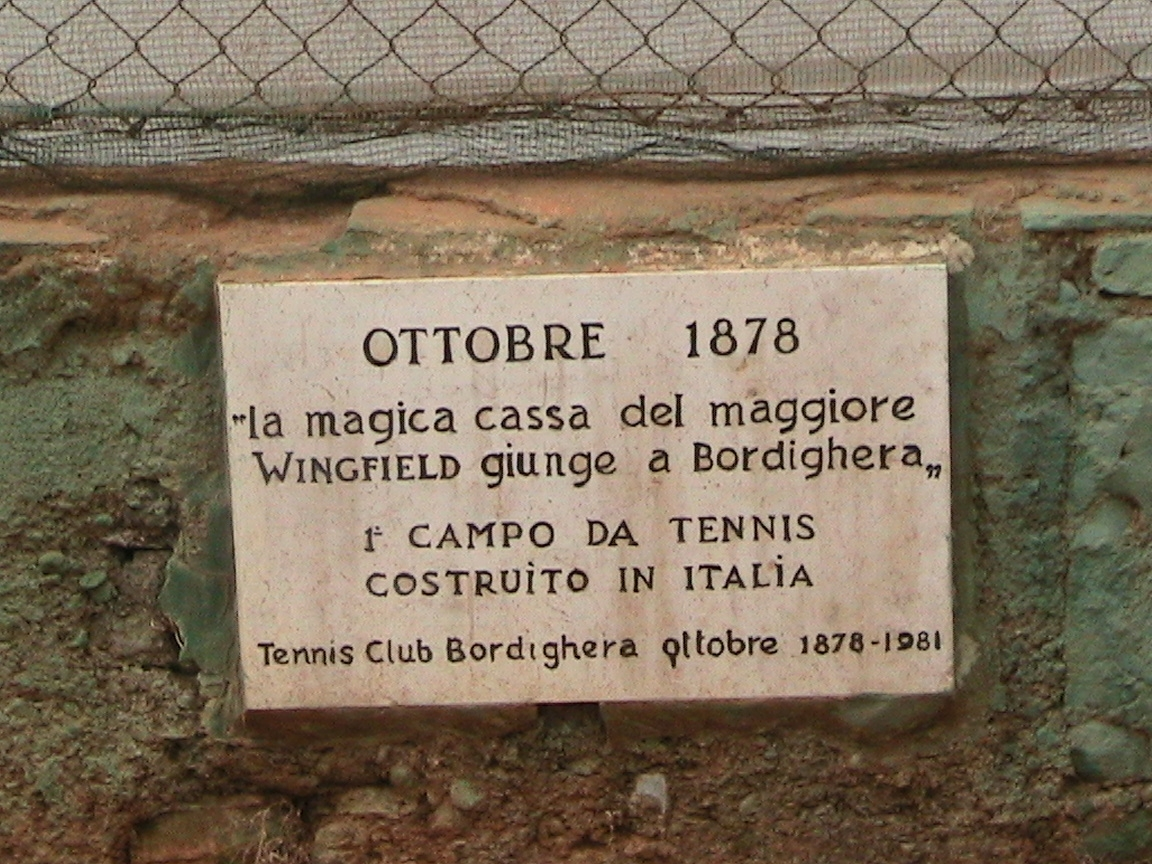
Plate Lawn Tennis Club 1878 (Bordighera)
