= Oratory of San Bartolomeo, Bordighera =

Oratorio di San Bartolomeo
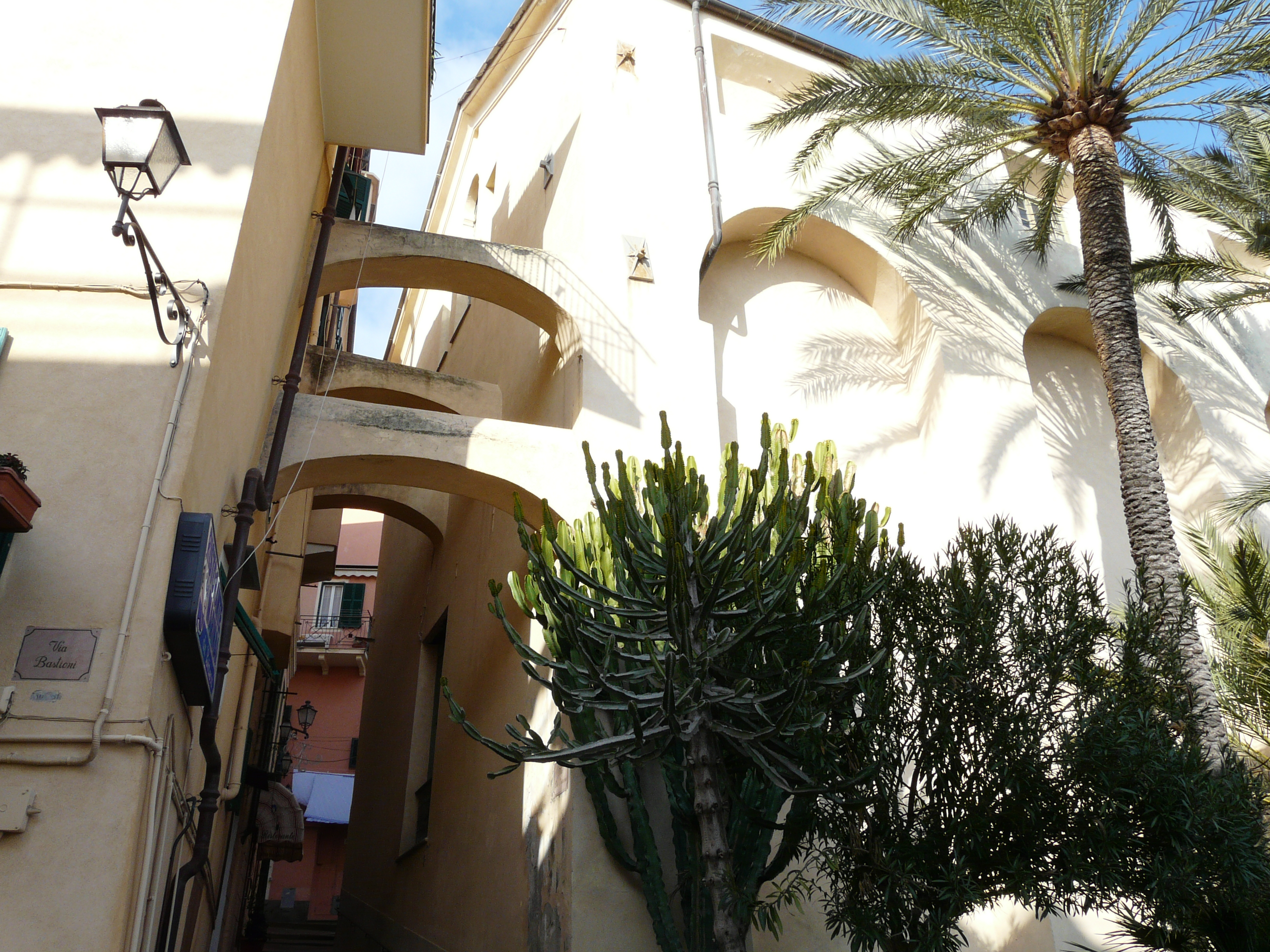
- St. Bartholomew Oratory (Bordighera)
- Oratorio di San Bartolomeo
- 43.7803°N 7.6742°E
- Location: Via dei Bastioni, Bordighera
- Country: Italy
- Denomination: Catholic

History
- Consecrated: 15th century

Administration
- Province: Province of Imperia
- Diocese: Ventimiglia-Sanremo

Clergy
- Bishop: Antonio Suetta
- Dean: Bordighera

The Oratory of Saint Bartholomew (Italian: Oratorio di San Bartolomeo) is a religious building in the centre of old Bordighera in the Riviera, Province of Imperia. The building is close to the Church of Saint Mary Magdalen.

== History and description ==
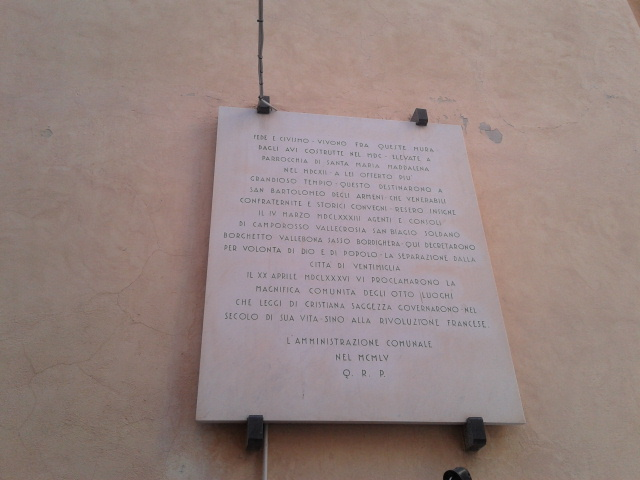
Oratorio San Bartolomeo plaque

The structure, named after Saint Bartholomew the Apostle, was built during the 15th century in the historic centre near the Church of Saint Mary Magdalen. The oratory underwent several changes, of which the most significant was in 1670. It is a single rectangular room decorated with a valuable organ purchased in 1804 by the organist of Oneglia Luigi Niggi. On the four walls of the room are four statues representing the four doctors of the Church: Ambrose, Gregory, Augustine and Jerome. The author is uncertain, it might be either Peter Notari or Peter Lucchesi.

On the altar is a wooden statue of Saint Bartholomew, made by the Genoese Agostino Vignola in 1865. Behind it one can admire a painting of the eighteenth century The Virgin and Child, St. John, St. Bartholomew and St. Benedict. On the sides, there are two scenes of Life of St. Bartholomew, and on the ceiling a great image of the saint painted by the Roman Ernesto Sprega in 1892. Sprega was known at the time for his work at the palace chapel of the Prince's Palace of Monaco, dedicated to John the Baptist.

The oratory is famous, as documented by a plaque on the facade, for the meeting of March 3, 1673 when representatives of the towns of Camporosso, Vallecrosia, San Biagio della Cima, Soldano, Borghetto San Nicolò, Vallebona, Sasso and Bordighera agreed on the separation from Ventimiglia and the establishment of the Magnificent Community of Eight Places .
