= Giuseppe Ferdinando Piana =

Italian painter (1864–1956)

- Born: Giuseppe Ferdinando Piana; 3 December 1864; Ceriana, Italy
- Died: 29 April 1956 (aged 91); Bordighera, Italy
- Known for: Painter
- Notable work: "Studio d’artista" (1898), "Ultima onda" (1919)
- Movement: Post-Impressionism
- Patrons: Andrea Gastaldi

Giuseppe Ferdinando Piana (3 December 1864 - 29 April 1956) was an Italian painter.

== Life and career ==
Piana shows from an early age a strong aptitude for painting. It was Ernest Meissonier who, during one of his stays in Bordighera at Villa Garnier, recommended to his parents that he study the arts. In 1882 Giuseppe Ferdinando Piana moved to Turin to study all'Albertina Academy where he had as professors Francesco Gamba and Andrea Gastaldi. It is in Turin that he made his first paintings: "A ponenete di Bordighera, campagna ligure", "Politica rustica" and in 1898 "Studio d'artista" that will be purchased by the government.

In 1903 he moved to Sesto San Giovanni, he exhibited at the Permanent show in Milan, where he presented "Peace", which received unexpected praise. In 1906 he was invited to the National exhibition in Milan where he presented "Cortile dei leoni a Granada", "La danza delle olive" and "Mare dopo la pioggia". The latter two paintings were purchased by the Galleria d'Arte Moderna (Milan). In 1919 he participated in the Quadrennial Turin presenting "Ultima onda" and in the same year he became a member of the prestigious Brera Academy.

Besides painting, he also studied the fresco technique and Queen Margaret commissioned him one for Villa Etelinda. Having lived in Bordighera, he got to know all the local artists of his time, including Charles Garnier, Mosé Bianchi, Hermann Nestel, Friederich von Kleudgen, Giuseppe Balbo and Pompeo Mariani. This last one will be one of his closest friends, and he'll introduce Mariani to Marcellina Caronni, who will then become his wife.

Piana always devoted special attention to the colours of Bordighera and of the neighbouring countries, demonstrating the technique of watercolour and oil, in particular for vivid glimpses of the rich vegetation, landscapes and bright sun. He became the personal professor of the Queen Mother and met De Amicis, of whom he made a portrait during his stay in Bordighera.

Several exhibitions of his paintings were organised, including a particularly rich one in 1954 at the Palazzo del Parco in Bordighera and a very significant one for the type of works on display at the Gallery Bolzani Milan in 1968.

Among his favourite students was the most beloved Fernando Pelosini (1901-1982) to whom he left all his painting material. Giuseppe Ferdinando Piana died in Bordighera in 1956 at the age of 92.

== Bibliography ==
- R. Falchi - E. Pfeifer, Giuseppe Ferdinando Piana pittore, Bergamo, Lucchetti, 1990
