= Sant'Ampelio, Bordighera =

Coordinates: 43.7774°N 7.6738°E

Sant'Ampelio
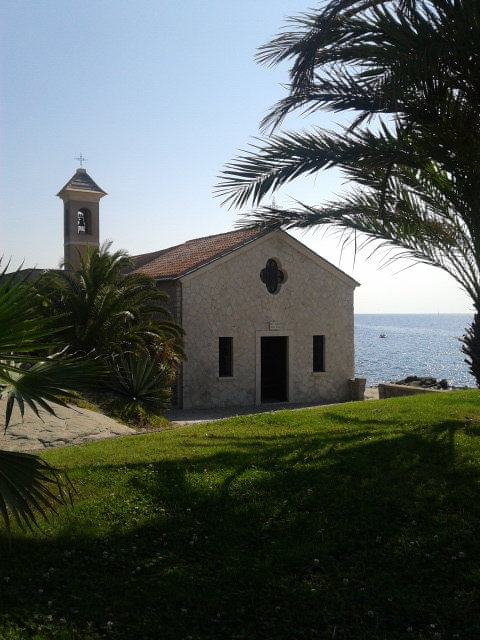
- Church of Saint Ampelio
- Sant'Ampelio
- Location: Bordighera
- Country: Italiy
- Website: Sito della parrocchia

History
- Status: National monument
- Consecrated: 11th century

Architecture
- Style: Romanesque architecture

Administration
- Province: Province of Imperia
- Diocese: Ventimiglia-Sanremo

Clergy
- Bishop: Antonio Suetta
- Dean: Bordighera

The church of Sant'Ampelio is located on Cape Sant'Ampelio, at the end of the "Promenade Argentina" in Bordighera in Liguria, Italy. The church is part of the properties protected by the Superintendent of Ministry of Cultural Heritage and Activities and Tourism.

== History ==
The original church was built in the eleventh century in pure Romanesque architecture. The church depended on the powerful Montmajour Abbey belonging to the Order of Saint Benedict.

In the 15th and 16th century the building was enlarged and received the wooden statue of Sant'Ampelio that appears on the altar. The crypt, which is illuminated by small windows overlooking the sea, has a block of La Turbie stone, which, according to a legend, was the bed of Saint Ampelio. Still according to that legend, Saint Ampelio died right on his stone bed on October 5 428.

After the uprising of 1140, the Republic of Genoa decided to punish the city by depriving the population of the relics of the saint and moved them in the Church of St. Stephen, in the more faithful city of Sanremo. On 14 May 1258 the city of Genoa decided to move back the relics, this time at the Abazzia di Santo Stefano which is located in Genoa. It was at this time that it was decided to appoint Saint Ampelio patron of blacksmiths.

In 1947, the archbishop of Genoa, Giuseppe Siri, finally decided to return the relics to Bordighera. The saint's relics were loaded on a boat and came to Bordighera on August 16. His remains were brought in procession to the Church of St. Mary Magdalen (Bordighera) and placed in the second chapel on the right side. The chapel contains a glass case in which there is a wax statue containing the relics of the saint. The statue and the frescoes decorating the chapel (1947), are the work of the Bordighera painter Giuseppe Balbo.

In 2014, works began on the restoration of the church, which ended with the re-opening to the public on May 24, 2015. The church is still operating with the celebration of Masses and weddings.

== Celebrations ==
Saint Ampelio, which is the city's patron saint, is celebrated on May 14, the day in which the city of Sanremo was deprived of the precious relics. The celebrations start a few days before with various events and reach their peak on the 14th with the procession and the fireworks taking place at Cape Saint Ampelio. Saint Ampelio was chosen as the patron saint of the city, not only because he chose the Cape as his permanent home, but also because, according to the legend, he planted the first seeds of Date palm that he had brought from his native Egypt It is therefore thanks to Saint Ampelio that the Ligurian town can claim the title of "Queen of palms".

== See also ==
- Bordighera
