= The Misunderstood Love =

- Italian: L'Amore Incompreso
- Directed by: Riccardo Di Gerlando
- Written by: Riccardo Di Gerlando
- Produced by: Sanremo Cinema
- Starring: Andrea Bonella; Sandra Colombi; Marco Pingiotti; Jessica Zambellini
- Cinematography: Simone Caridi
- Music by: Matteo Consoli
- Release date: July 25, 2013
- Running time: 10 minutes
- Country: Italy
- Language: Italian

The Misunderstood Love (in Italian L'Amore Incompreso) is a 2013 Italian dramatic short film directed by Riccardo Di Gerlando.

== Synopsis ==
A man witnesses the physical mutation of a young woman with Down syndrome.

Set in the Italian region Liguria and more specifically at the Hanbury Gardens and Bordighera’s Villa Etelinda, the movie deals with the theme of disability emphasizing how ephemeral is the distinction between normal and different, especially when related to love.

The protagonists are two young adults with Down syndrome. Holding hands, they picture themselves living their pure and honest love in an imaginary world, inspired by a few posters hung on an old wall.

She imagines herself as a long blonde haired girl, he pictures himself as an attractive young man, passionately in love. They seek, look, and meet each other. By meeting each other in their fantasies, they actually meet themselves in reality, as they are, in a touching bond of love and happiness.

== Awards ==
The Misunderstood Love has been screened in over 20 film festivals worldwide. It won the following awards:

- Award Disability Issues Accolade Global Film Competition – Web Award (USA)
- Best Short Movie Richmond Diversity Film Festival – Los Angeles (California, USA)
- Best Actor Festival CinEuphoria ad Andrea Bonella – Lisbona (Portogallo)
- Best Short Movie Festival CortoCultura by Petrosino – Trapani (Italia)
- Best Short Movie MakarFest by Mazzarrone – Catania (Italia)
- Best Director Festival CortiIncontri by Sant’Urbano – Pordenone (Italia)

It has been selected in the following festivals:

- Official Selection 12th Kalpanirjhar International Short Fiction Film Festival (India)
- Official Selection 3rd Extraordinary Film Festival – Namur (Belgio)
- Official Selection Sprout Film Festival – New York City (New York, USA)
- Official Selection 21st International Festival of Local Televisions – Kosice (Slovacchia)
- Official Selection Viareggio Shakespeare Film Festival – Lucca (Italia)
- Official Selection Cervignano Film Festival – Udine (Italia)
- Official Selection Fluvione Corto Festival – Ascoli Piceno (Italia)
- Official Selection CortoBoomArt by Torre del Lago – Lucca (Italia)
- Official Selection IV Concorso Corto e MALeCAVAT – Potenza (Italia)
- Selection David di Donatello 2014
