= Pallanca exotic gardens =

Botanical garden in Liguria, Italy

The Pallanca exotic gardens
- Giardino esotico Pallanca
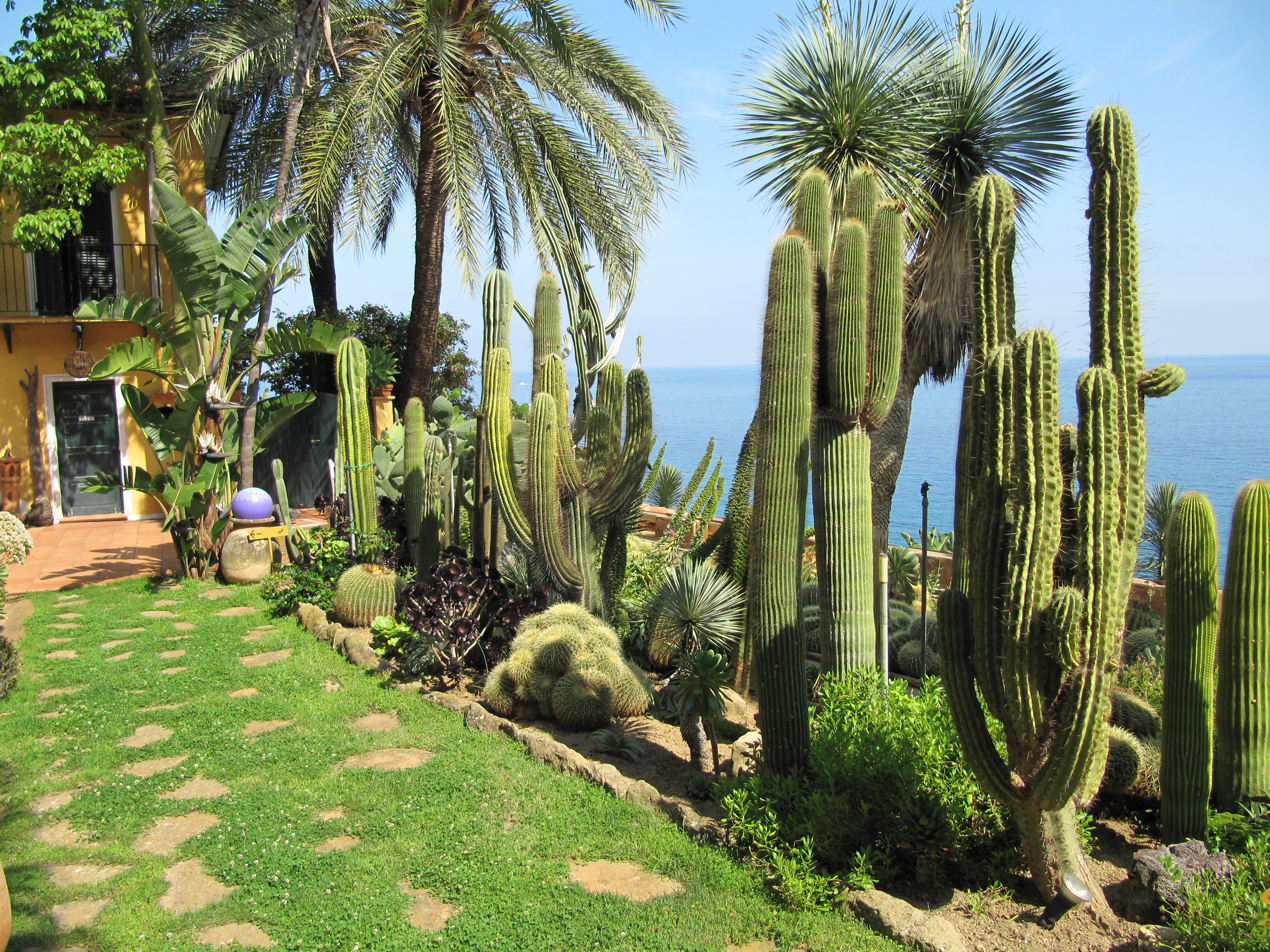
- The Pallanca exotic gardens

- Location within Italy
- Location: via Madonna della Ruota 1
- Nearest city: Bordighera, Italy
- Coordinates: 43°47′17″N 7°41′08″E
- Created: Giacomo Pallanca
- Designation: Public gardens

The Pallanca exotic gardens, which has a major collection of cactus and succulent plants of Europe, is at via Madonna della Ruota 1 in Bordighera, Liguria, Italy.

== History ==
In 1861, Giacomo Pallanca abandoned the traditional family business of olive production in Airole, to join the German botanist Ludwig Winter. Pallanca will then work with Winter for more than 20 years. During this period he also passed his passion to his son Bartolomeo who, from an early age, decided to work with his father and with Winter.

In 1910, Bartolomeo Pallanca left Winter and established its own gardens of ornamental plants and flowers. There was an interruption during the war years, but Bartolomeo resumed its activity with the help of his son Giacomo and together they decided to specialize in succulent plants. The plant nursery quickly became a point of reference, and Pallanca will be asked to collaborate in the design of several gardens, including the Montjuïc park in Barcelona and Trauttmansdorff gardens in Merano.

Since 1989, thanks to Barth, son of Giacomo Pallanca, the plant nursery, which continues its activities, has been open to the public. In the 10,000 square meters of gardens you can admire more than 3000 varieties amongst which a Copiapoa from Chile which has more than 300 years and a Neobuxbaumia polylopha more than 6 meters high stand out.

== Photo gallery ==
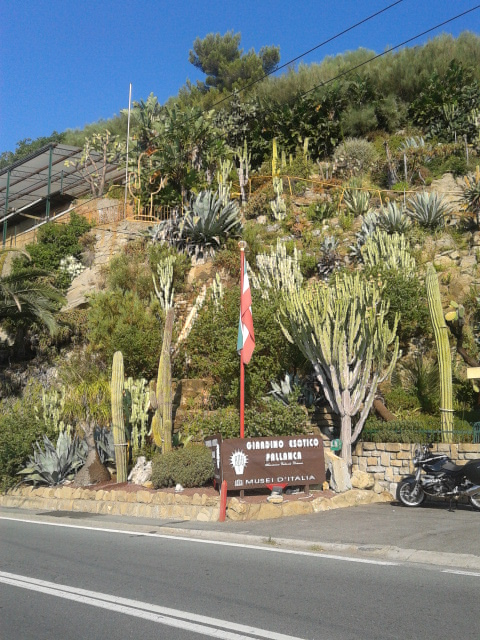
The Pallanca exotic gardens

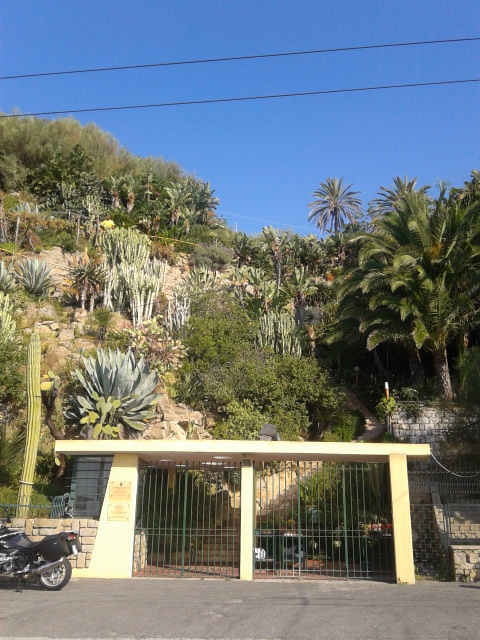
Giardini Pallanca 2, entrance
