= Sardenaira =

Pizza dish without cheese from Liguria

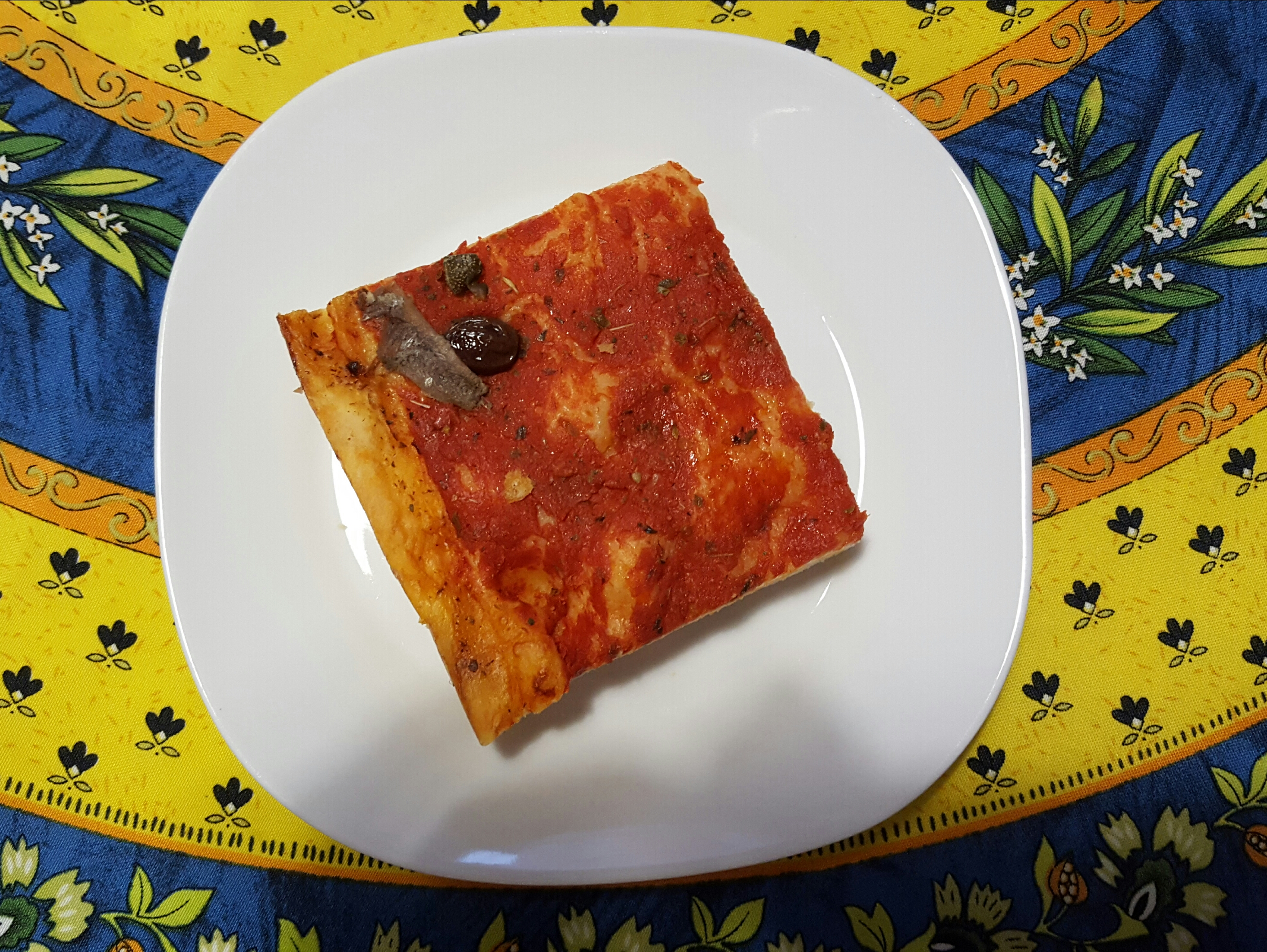
Sardenaira

Sardenaira (also known as pissalandrea, pizza all'Andrea, piscialandrea, pizzalandrea, pissadella or sardenaira) is a pizza dish, without cheese, from the Liguria region of Italy. It is very similar to the pissaladière. Although termed a pizza, some consider it more akin to a focaccia.

== Name ==
It is known as sardenaira or pizza all'Andrea, after admiral Andrea Doria (1466–1560), whose favorite food was the dish: a slice of bread with olive oil, garlic, and salted anchovy.

== History ==
The dish predates the better-known Neapolitan pizza. Since the dish was created before the Columbian exchange, traditionalists do not add tomatoes.

== Variations ==
In the city of Sanremo, in western Liguria, it is garnished with salted anchovies, local olives, garlic cloves, and capers.

== See also ==
- Cuisine of Liguria
- List of pizza varieties by country
