= Villa Etelinda =

Coordinates: 43.7829°N 7.6672°E

Villa Bischoffsheim or Villa Etelinda
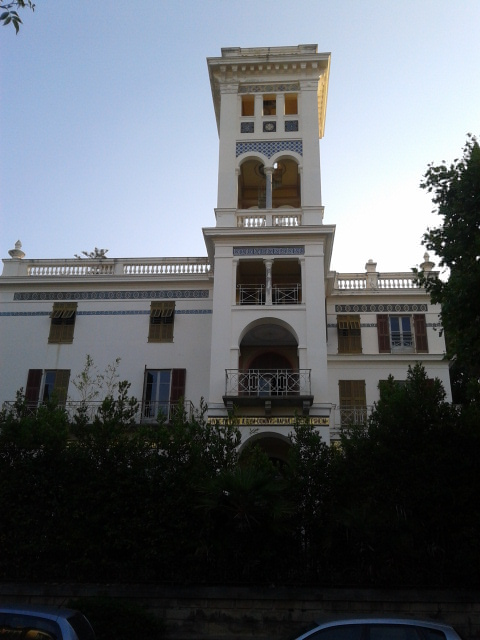
- Villa Bischoffsheim or Villa Etelinda.
- Interactive map of the Villa Bischoffsheim or Villa Etelinda area

General information
- Location: Bordighera, Italy
- Construction started: ca. 1873-1875
- Completed: ca. 1875
- Client: Raphael Bischoffsheim

Design and construction
- Architect: Charles Garnier
- Designations: Soprintendenze per i Beni Architettonici e Paesaggistici della Liguria

The Villa Etelinda is a villa of the 19th century located at 38 Via Romana in Bordighera, province of Imperia in Liguria. Originally named Villa Bischoffsheim, the house was renamed in 1896 as Villa Etelinda by Claude Bowes-Lyon, 13th Earl of Strathmore and Kinghorne (paternal grandfather of Queen Elizabeth The Queen Mother). The villa is part of the property protected by the Superintendent for Architectural Heritage and Landscape of Liguria.

== History ==
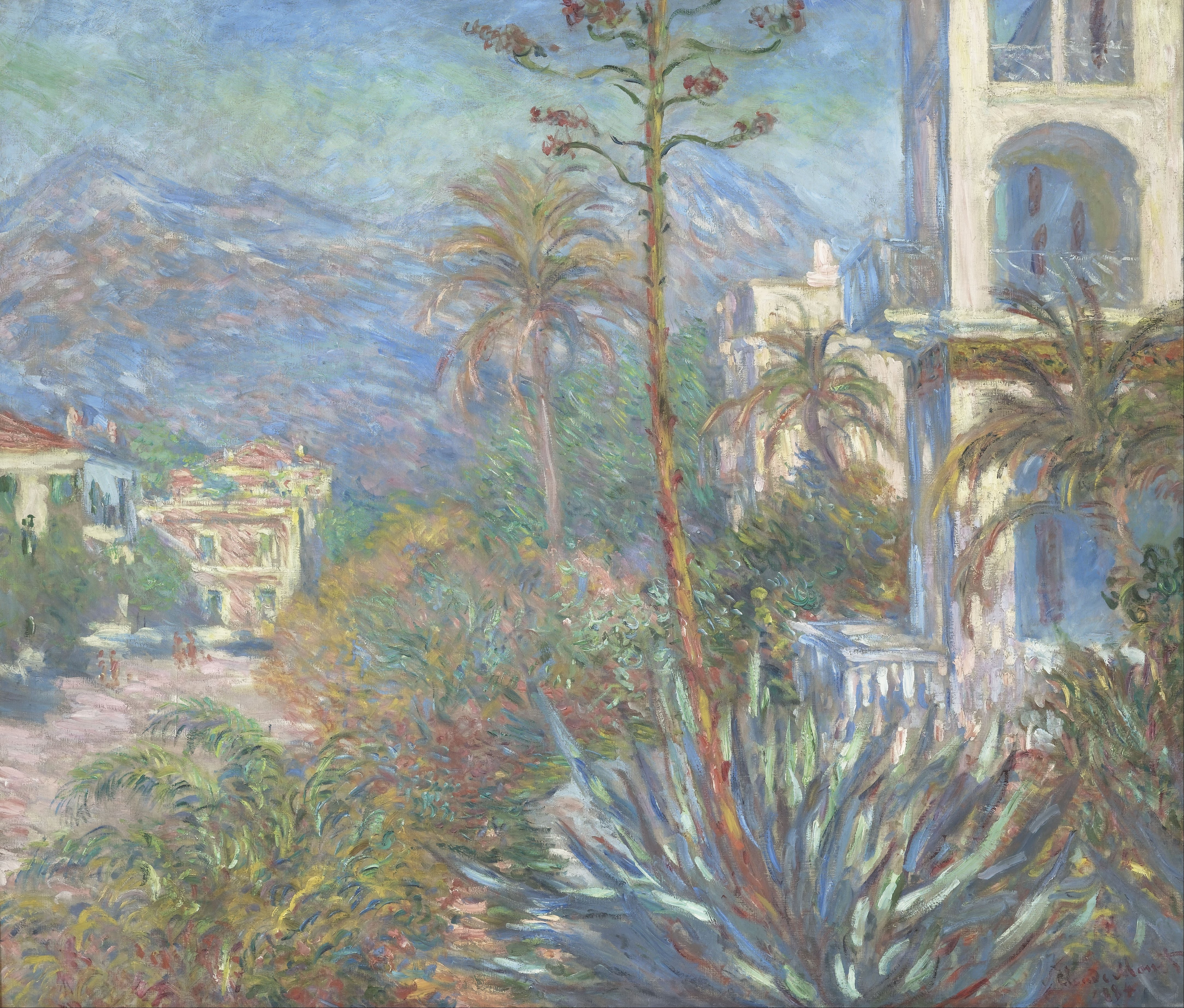
Painting by Claude Monet, the Musée d'Orsay: Les Villas à Bordighera representing part of Villa Bischoffsheim (its tower).

The villa was built in Bordighera on the Via Romana by Raphaël Bischoffsheim, hence the name of the villa. Bischoffsheim was a banker of German origin who lived in Paris. He had met the architect Charles Garnier probably thanks to his father, who owned a large room next to the yards of the Paris Opera, where sometimes concerts were held. In 1873 Bischoffsheim commissioned Garnier to build him a villa in Bordighera. The first drawings foresaw an ambitious project, both as regards the surface, than the styles and materials. Probably the villa had been placed in a higher position than the current one, both in order to enjoy a better view and to create a more imposing effect on visitors. Unfortunately the ardour of Bischoffsheim cooled and while designing the final plans Garnier received the order to cut costs. The architect was therefore forced to reduce the size and eventually adopted solutions very similar to those used for Villa Garnier.

Unfortunately there were disagreements between the rich German banker and the municipality of Bordighera. Bischoffsheim was having problems in enforcing the commitments made when he lent the moneys in December 1875 to the city to upgrade the Roman road. Bischoffsheim, who had bought land in the area and was building his villa, intended to upgrade the old mule track into an elegant path. He even had a project designed by Garnier. The loan had been bound to the project by the French architect, but the city council accepted the loan whilst approving a different project. It was only thanks to an awareness campaign by the citizens that the Garnier project was finally accepted in June 1877. Another disappointment for Bischoffsheim came from the lack of enthusiasm for another of his proposals: to build an astronomical observatory on Montenero. Bischoffsheim bothered by the conflict with city officials decided to move its sphere of interests to France and funded an Observatory on the heights of Nice in 1878.

Of the original project, the villa kept some elements including the beautiful and slender tower, an element that Garnier had already used for his own villa. Another element which was kept is the polychrome mosaics on the facade and on the tower which are reminiscent of Moorish decorations. Of particular elegance is the RB monogram located between the arches of the loggia which dominates the entrance to the villa. The interior consists of a large entrance hall with an elegant circular mosaic on the floor. On the west side there are the living room and the dining room, and on the east side, the pool hall. From the atrium departs an impressive staircase leading to the upper floor and to the rooms.

The villa was completed in 1875, Bischoffsheim stayed there for some time and received numerous prestigious guests, including also Louis Pasteur, but he quickly rented out the villa. In 1879 the future Queen Margherita of Italy was a guest of the villa with her mother Princess Elisabeth of Saxony, Marchioness of Rapallo and Dowager Duchess of Genoa.

Some of those who were guests rented the villa and, on 14 April 1896, it was bought by Scottish Aristocrat Claude Bowes-Lyon, 13th Earl of Strathmore and Kinghorne, who changed its name to Villa Etelinda. The name was changed to honour the success obtained by his daughter Mildred Marion Bowes-Lyon with her opera "Etelinda", which premiered in Florence in 1894. Lady Mildred was one of the first composers who presented her own work on stage. This was such a novelty that her name was made public only on the second night when the audience called for the author to appear on stage. The Bowes-Lyon family had already stayed in Bordighera for some years. As of 1910, Elizabeth Bowes-Lyon, the future Queen Mother, would come regularly each winter to Bordighera, with her family. Later she returned with her daughter, the future Queen Elizabeth II, to spend the colder months, but they stayed at Villa Poggio Ponente which is situated on the outskirts of Bordighera near Vallecrosia.

In 1913, the villa and the huge garden were sold to the Italian Queen Mother Queen Margherita.

== Garden ==
The garden of the villa was designed by the Prussian landscape designer Ludwig Winter assisted by the Belgium hydraulic engineer Paul-Vincent Levieux.
