= Friederich von Kleudgen =

German painter

- Born: 23 February 1856; Würzburg, Germany
- Died: 22 June 1924 (aged 68); Bordighera, Italy
- Known for: Painter
- Notable work: “Nido di pesci” (in english Fish’s nest), “Serpente marino” (in english Sea Serpent)

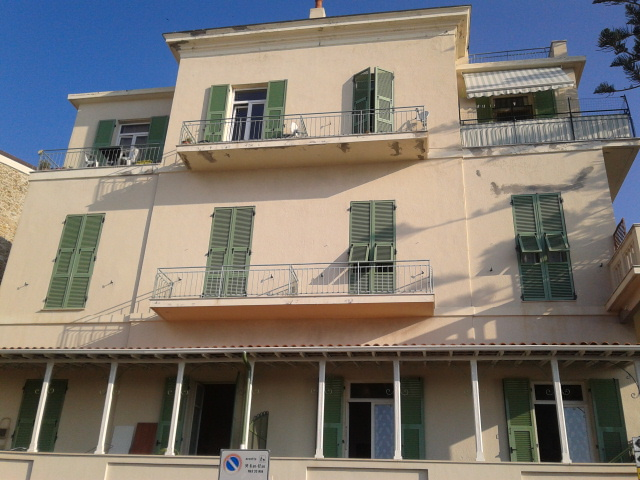
Front of Villa Banana

Baron Friedrich von Kleudgen (23 February 1856 – 22 June 1924), sometimes known by his nickname Fritz, was born in Germany and studied painting in Weimar. He later moved to the Dresden Academy of Fine Arts where he met Adrian Ludwig Richter. Like many artists of his time, he visited Italy, with extended stays in Naples and Venice.

In 1873 he arrived in Bordighera with his wife and stayed at the Pensione Calvauna, which later became Coffee Cadama, until 1884. In the city he found a small German community and fascinated by the climate and light, decided to settle in the Ligurian town. In 1885 he built his home just outside the walls of old Bordighera, near the port of Magdalena and the old cemetery. The house, which he named "Villa Banana", and that is on the 4th of Via dei Colli, still exists today but was converted into an apartment building.

In 1891 he married his second wife, Elizabeth Pudmensky. They had three children: Frieda, William (mountaineer who died in 1929) and Luise who died in 1898. The only surviving child was Baroness Frieda von Kleudgen Peano, who in 1971 wrote a book on her father's life, "My father". The daughter remembers that on the terrace of the house in the summer evenings, von Kleudgen often fiddled with bordigotti friends including the painter and Mayor GF Piana. The father loved the simple life of the village and often spoke with fishermen returning from the Bay dell'Arziglia.

He was fascinated by the sea, which he painted in numerous paintings. His paintings portray the sea in various states of calm and storm, conveying the full force of nature. His most famous paintings are the "fish's Nest" and the "Sea Serpent" which can be seen at the Bicknell Museum. Some of his paintings are on display at the Town hall of Bordighera but the majority is in private collections. Another subject he liked to paint were the paths of Bordighera.

He also had close ties of friendship with numerous bordigotti of different welfare states and represented them in his paintings. He was a friends of the other painters and artists who lived in Bordighera as Pompeo Mariani, Giuseppe Ferdinando Piana, Hermann Nestel, Charles Garnier and of course Ludwig Winter.

In 1884 Claude Monet portrayed him while he painted a window of Villa Garnier. Kleudgen reproduced in a series of watercolors the bordigotti he liked so much. Some of these works became popular because they were taken up in postcards of the time.

He died in Bordighera on 22 June 1924, at the age of 68 years.
