= Raphaël Bischoffsheim =

French banker and politician (1823–1906)

Raphaël-Louis Bischoffsheim
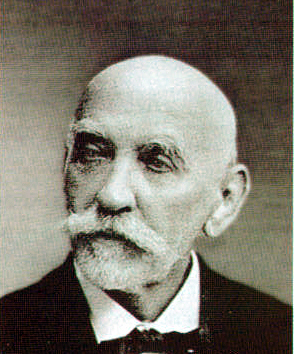

Deputy of the National Assembly for Alpes-Maritimes
- In office 1 January 1881 – 9 November 1885
- Prime Minister: Léon Gambetta; Charles de Freycineti; Charles Duclerc; Armand Fallières; Jules Ferry

Personal details
- Born: 22 July 1823 Amsterdam, Kingdom of the Netherlands
- Died: 20 May 1906 (aged 82) Rome, Italy
- Party: Independent
- Education: École Centrale des Arts et Manufactures
- Occupation: Banker, politician, patron
- Awards: Legion of Honour

Raphaël-Louis Bischoffsheim (22 July 1823 – 20 May 1906) was a French banker and a member of the prominent Bischoffsheim family.

== Family background ==
Raphaël-Louis’ father, Louis-Raphaël Bischoffsheim, was born in Mainz in 1800 and as an early orphan, he had to leave high school to work at the bank of Hayum Salomon Goldschmidt. In 1820, he left Frankfurt to create his own bank in Amsterdam. In 1822, he married the sister of Benedict Hayum Goldschmidt, Amelia. In 1850, the family moved permanently to Paris, where he opened one of the three branches of his bank.

== Life and career ==
Raphaël-Louis had already been sent to Paris by his father in 1842 to study at the École Centrale des Arts et Manufactures. After graduation, he was appointed as inspector of the railway line in northern Italy belonging to his father. He worked there until 1873, when he took over from his father the management of the family's banking group. On 24 April 1880, he obtained French nationality.

In 1873, Bischoffsheim commissioned architect Charles Garnier to build a villa in Bordighera, which was called Villa Bischoffsheim and finished in 1875. Bischoffsheim, who was a very generous person, had started investing and making plans to improve the city. What was closest to his heart was the construction of an observatory on the Mount Bego. Unfortunately, the municipalities proved unreceptive to the proposal of the banker, and Bischoffsheim, who had already had problems with money loaned to the city for improving the Via Romana, decided to move his center of interests back to France.

His passion for astronomy had already driven him to invest in the observatories of Paris, of Montsouris and of the Pic du Midi. When Bordighera did not accept his proposal for an observatory, Bischoffsheim built one in Nice on Mont-Gros, providing it with all the latest equipment and making it a center of excellence. The observatory was opened in October 1887. His contribution to science and society was such that Bischoffsheim received from the French Government the Legion of Honour and in 1889, at the Universal Exposition of Paris, two gold medals: one for the Nice Observatory and another for the professional school of the Boulevard Bourdon in Paris.

In 1881, he was chosen to represent the district of Nice in the Chamber of Deputies, but not wanting to join any party, he was not re-elected in 1885. Instead, he was re-elected in 1889 for Nice and, in 1893, for Puget-Théniers (see list of deputies on French wikipedia).

In 1890, he was elected as a free member of the French Academy of Sciences.
