= Hermann Nestel =

German painter

- Born: Hermann; 10 May 1858; Stuttgart, Kingdom of Württemberg
- Died: 1905; Ventimiglia, Italy
- Known for: Painter
- Notable work: "Vallone del Sasso" "Pomeriggio a Bordighera"

Herman Nestel (1858-1905) was a German painter.

== Biography ==
Hermann Nestel was born in Stuttgart and, from an early age, showed a particular aptitude for the arts. He began his artistic training in his hometown and then moved to Munich and Berlin. Like many artists of the time, he made his trip to Italy to complete his training.

In 1882 he was commissioned by the German Wilhelm Spemann to illustrate the Ligurian and French coasts, from Nice to La Spezia. The drawings of Nestel were used to illustrate the book "Die Riviera", written by Woldemar Kaden.

In 1887 he decided to settle in Bordighera. There, he met the botanist and landscape architect Ludwig Winter with whom he became friend. In Bordighera, he continued to collaborate with German publishers, in particular with the magazines "Gartenlaube" and "Über Land und Meer".

In Bordighera, one of Nestel's daughters married Antonio, the first-born of Ludwig Winter. Nestel then began a collaboration with Winter in the creation of gardens, without however interrupting his work as a painter. One of his most beautiful paintings is undoubtedly the "Vallone del Sasso" now housed at the International Institute of Ligurian Studies (IISL).

The painter loved to represent in his paintings not only the landscape, but also life in Bordighera. His well-known painting "Afternoon in Bordighera" represents fishermen and rocks. He had the opportunity to exhibit his works not only in Bordighera, memorable was the one at the "Victoria Hall" in Via Vittorio Veneto, but also in Turin and Germany.

Nestel was a friend of the narrow group of intellectuals and artists who had so enriched the life of the Ligurian town, as Pompeo Mariani, Giuseppe Ferdinando Piana, Charles Garnier, Clarence Bicknell and of course the countrymen Ludwig Winter and Friederich von Kleudgen.

He died at the age of 47 in 1905. His grave is in the cemetery of Bordighera.

== Photo gallery ==
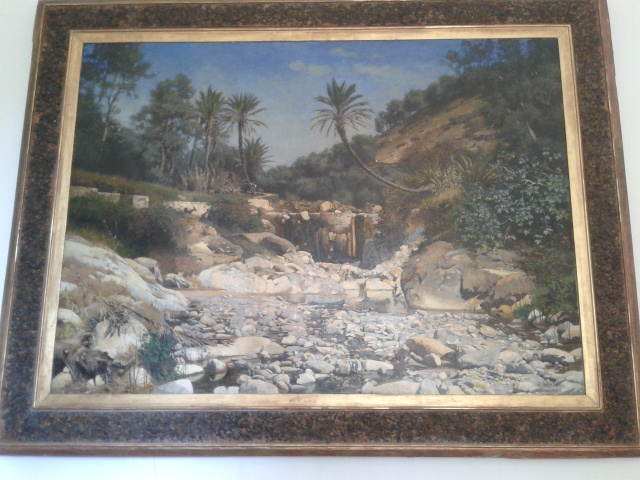
"Vallone del Sasso" Hermann Nestel

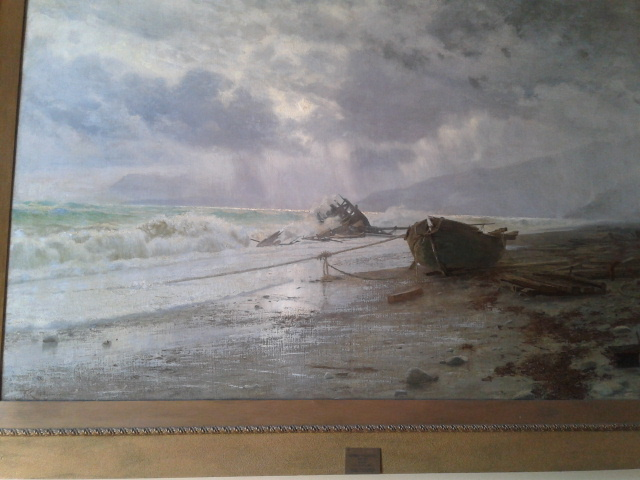
"Marina" Hermann Nestel

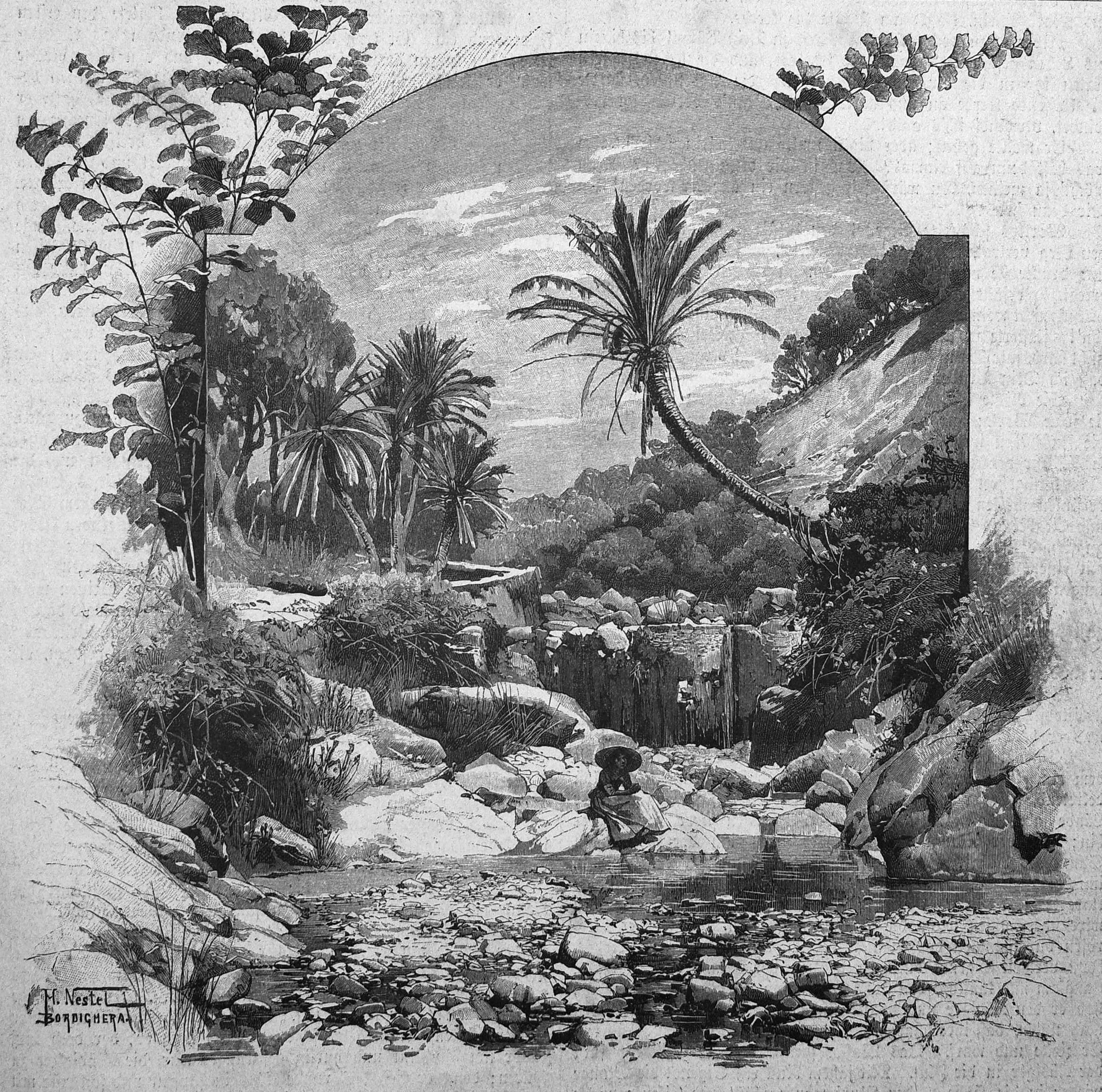
Vallone del Sasso (1894)
