= Church of St. Mary Magdalen (Bordighera) =

Coordinates: 43.7805°N 7.6737°E

Chiesa di Santa Maria Maddalena
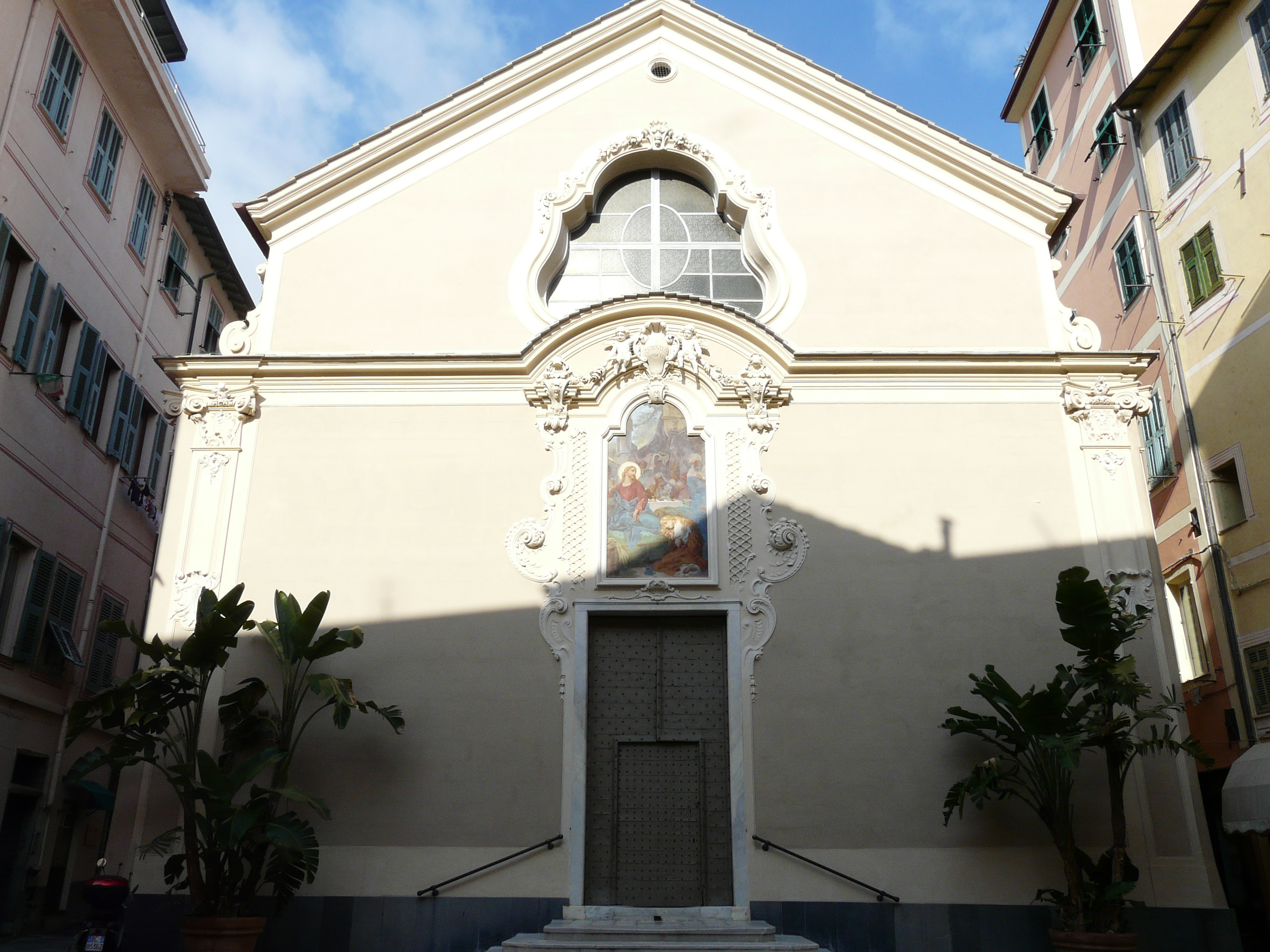
- Church of Saint mary Magdalene
- Chiesa di Santa Maria Maddalena
- Location: Bordighera
- Country: Italy

History
- Consecrated: 1617

Architecture
- Functional status: Chiesa parrocchiale
- Style: Rococo

Administration
- Province: Province of Imperia
- Diocese: Ventimiglia-Sanremo

Clergy
- Bishop: Antonio Suetta
- Dean: Bordighera

The church of Saint Mary Magdalene is a church located in Piazza del Popolo in the centre of Bordighera on the Riviera in Province of Imperia, Liguria, Italy. The church is home to the parish of Bordighera and of the Nervia Valley diocese of Ventimiglia-Sanremo. The church is part of the properties protected by the Superintendent of Ministry of Cultural Heritage and Activities and Tourism (Italy).

== History and description ==
Built in the early 17th century, the church was consecrated in 1617 and later renovated in 1866 embellishing it with new gilded stucco. According to local tales, the residents of the parish paid for the renovations with the spontaneous donation of jewelry to the parish priest.

Between 1881 and 1883 there was a second restoration, and it seems that the pastor, Father James Avenue, due to the very small budget, urged businessmen, artists and intellectuals to participate in various ways in the restoration of the religious building. Thanks to a letter of businessmen Mombelli and Bulgheroni, we know that the plans were sent to Charles Garnier (architect). Without reliable data it can only be supposed that Garnier provided some simple advice to the restoration of the church.

The facade, decorated with Rococo style stucco is from 1906.

Above the portal is a fresco depicting Mary Magdalene (1742) by Giacomo Raimondo, subsequently upgraded in 1922 by Luigi Morgari. The Stucco, dating from 1670, are the work of Francesco Marvaldi (1647-1706), member of the family of Marvaldi Candeasco at Oneglia, famous architects of the time. The chandelier in the middle of the vault is a gift from Queen Margherita of Savoy.

On the main altar is a marble statue of the 18th century, the '’'Maddalena in Gloria'’', designed by Filippo Parodi and possibly carved by his son Domenico Parodi between 1714 and 1717. The wooden statue of the Our Lady of the Rosary of 1702 is placed on a side Rosary altar, while the famous wax statue in which are placed the relics of Sant'Ampelio - patron of Bordighera - is positioned in the second altar on the right of the church.

The Bell tower, separated from the church, stands above a Loggia of the late Middle Ages, dominating the profile of the Old Town with a Spire decorated with painted Maiolica tiles. Historically it was a medieval watchtower, used by the inhabitants to watch for pirate boats coming from the sea, which was frequent in that period. The tower was later elevated to become in the 18th century the current bell tower.

== Photo gallery ==
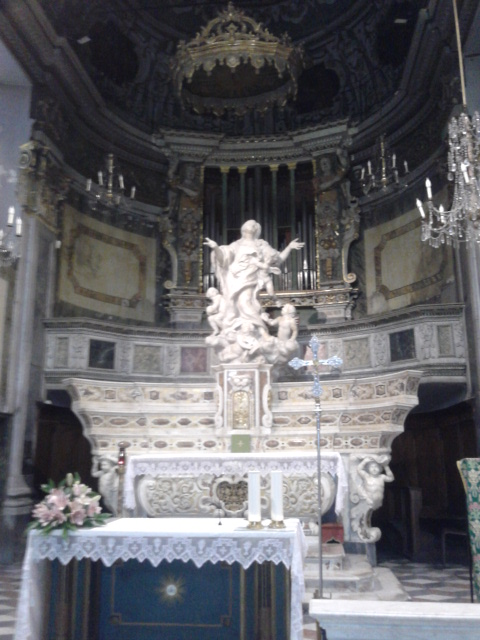
Main altar of St. Mary Magdalen Church

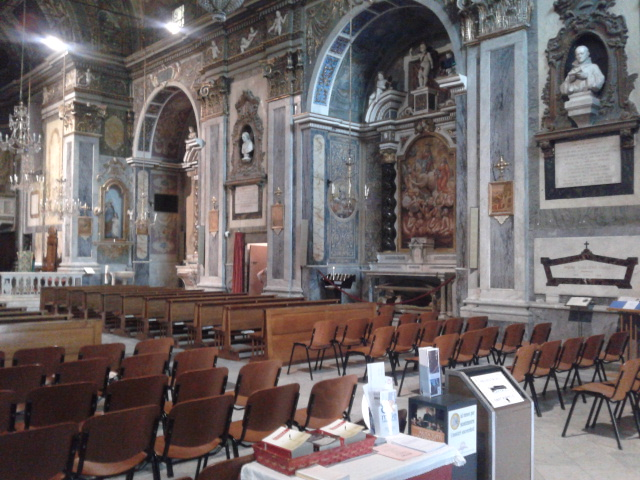
Church St. Mary Magdalen inner right view

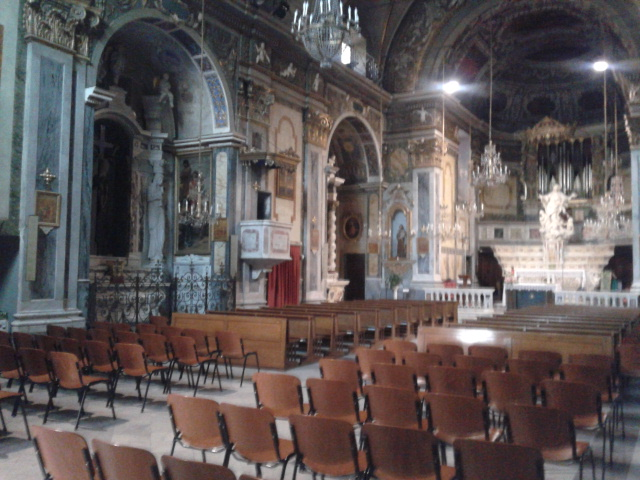
Church St. Mary Magdalen inner left view
