= Pompeo Mariani =

Italian painter (1857–1927)

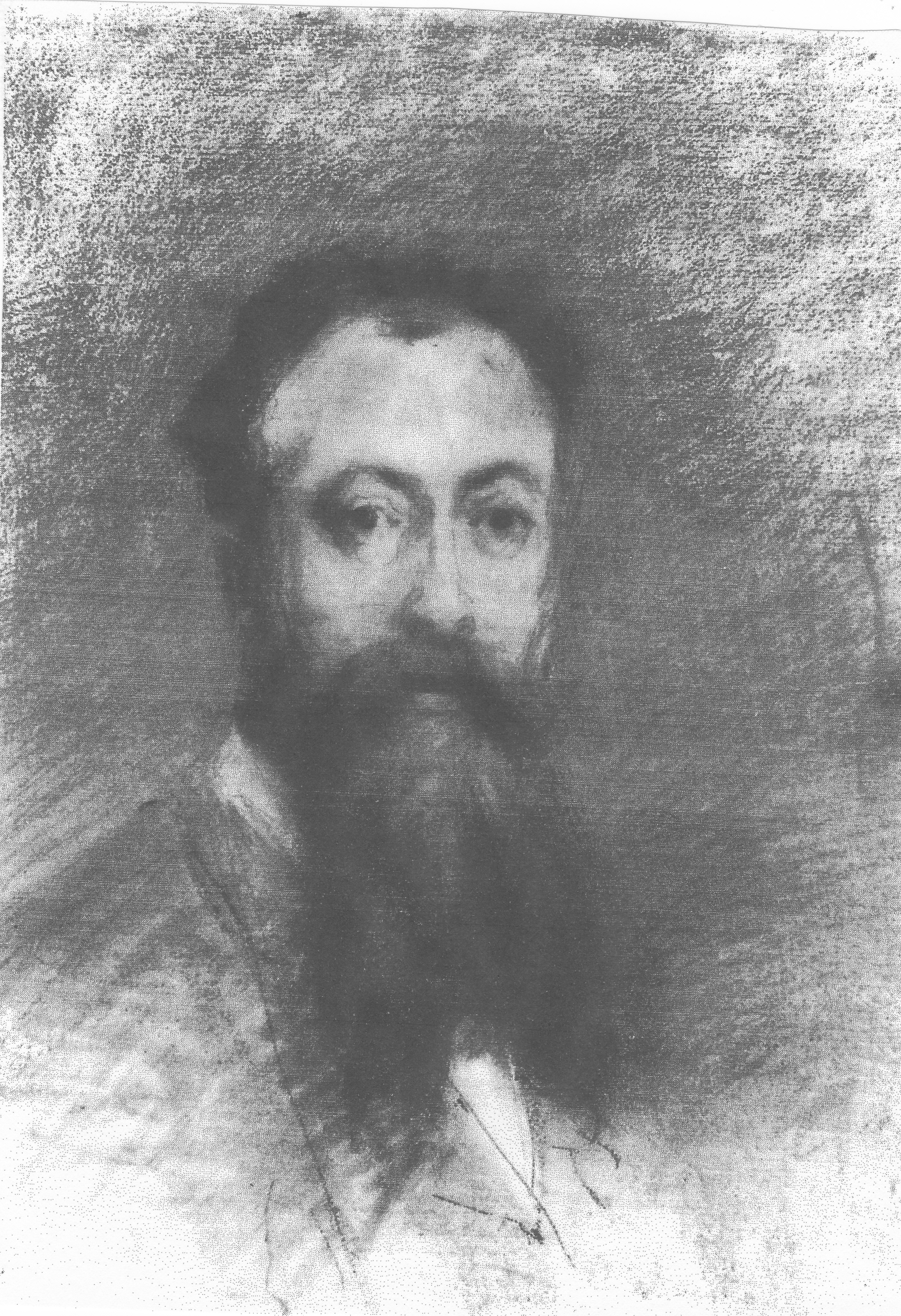
- Pompeo Mariani, self portrait (1908)
- Born: 9 September 1857; Monza, Italy
- Died: 25 January 1927 (aged 69); Bordighera, Italy
- Known for: Painter
- Notable work: "Il saluto al sole morente" (1884), "La partenza di Graibaldi dallo scoglio di Quarto" (1892, Roma Galleria nazionale d'arte moderna), "La sala dei passi perduti" (1913 Roma, Galleria nazionale d'arte moderna )
- Movement: Impressionism

Pompeo Mariani (9 September 1857 – 25 January 1927) was an Italian painter.

== Biography ==
Mariani was born in Monza, Province of Milan. The nephew of the painter Mosè Bianchi, he abandoned a career in banking to devote himself entirely to painting. His apprenticeship began in 1879 under the guidance of the painter Eleuterio Pagliano, who introduced him to life studies. A trip to Egypt with Uberto Dell’Orto in 1881 provided subjects for the works shown at the Brera exhibitions of the next two years. He focused on landscape painting and began to specialise in seascapes in 1883, when he first stayed on the coast of Liguria. The first views of the Zelata area outside Pavia appeared in 1894. His art is characterised by subtle sensitivity in the investigation of the reflection of light on water, captured in different seasons and times of the day to achieve highly atmospheric effects. It was at the beginning of the new century that he began to combine naturalistic landscapes with depictions of the elegant world of high society in fashionable gatherings and cafés. His vast production of landscapes and portraits was regularly presented at the major national and international exhibitions and won numerous official awards.

In 1882, an oriental sketch and his Woods in Park of Monza won him the Fumagalli prize at an exhibit at the Brera Academy, and in the same year, his Port of Genoa and Rain at Genoa won him a gold medal at the International Exhibition of Nice. In 1884 won the Umberto prize of 4000 lire with his painting Salute to the Dying Sun. His painting of Vaporino rimorchiatore was purchased for the Galleria Nazionale D'Arte Moderna in Rome. He painted a Portrait of General Garibald in for the Italian association in Valparaiso, Chile. In 1885 he won a gold medal at Paris for his Orientalist sketches and a silver medal at London, for his sea-scapes. He was made an honorary Associate of the Brera Academy. . He painted in 1888: Favola d' Esopo; Burrasca; and Bacio furioso. Among other works are: L'ora che volge il desìo; Sorge la luna; D' autunno radon le foglie; and Porto di Genoa al tramonto. In 1889, he sent to Paris two paintings, Cantuccio di primavera and Acqua a catinelle. He died in Bordighera, Province of Imperia, aged 70.

== Photo gallery ==
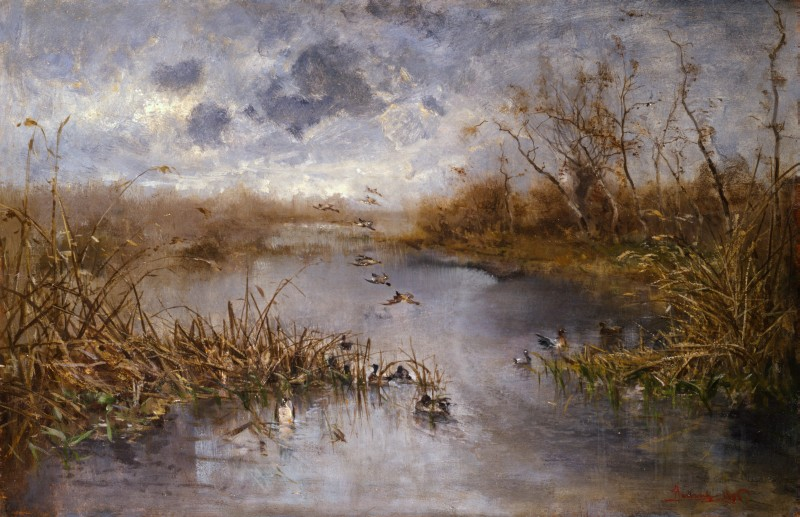
Cascina Zelada

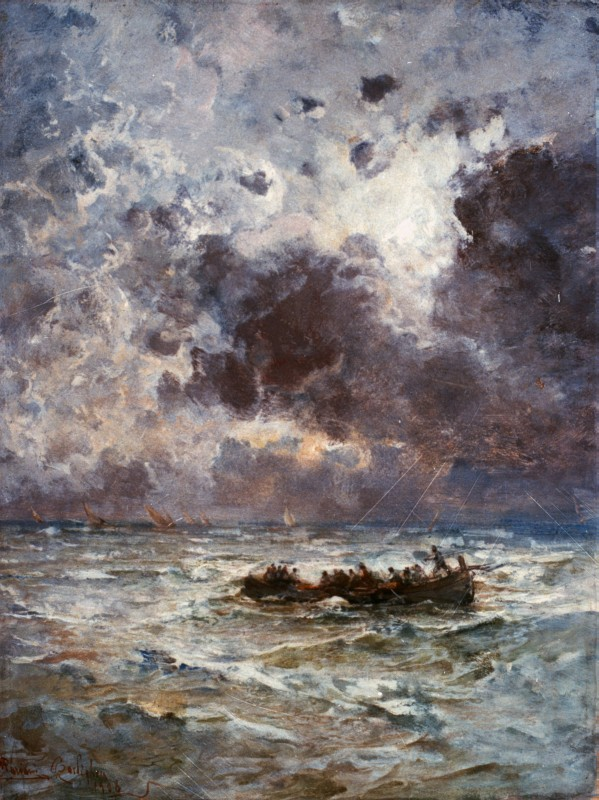
Marine at Bordighera

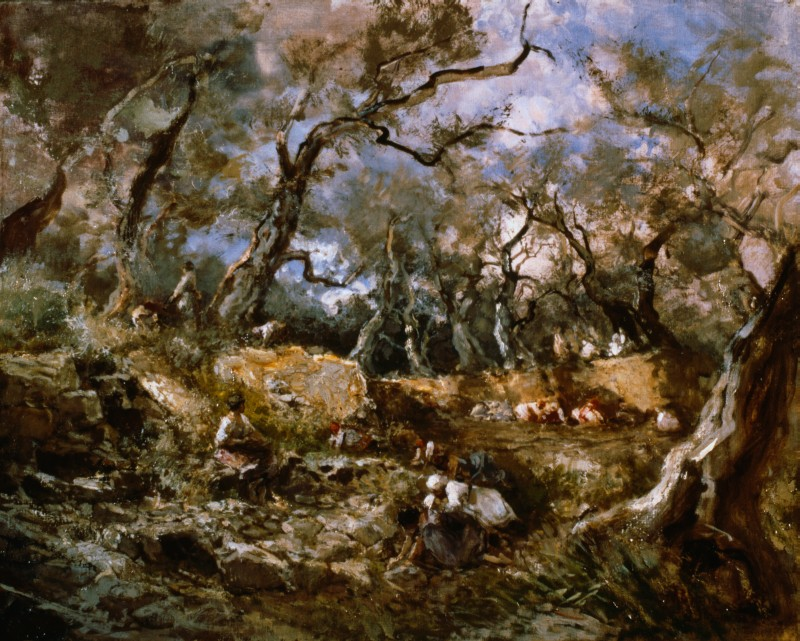
Mariani Pompeo, Ulivi a Bordighera o La raccolta delle olive a Bordighera

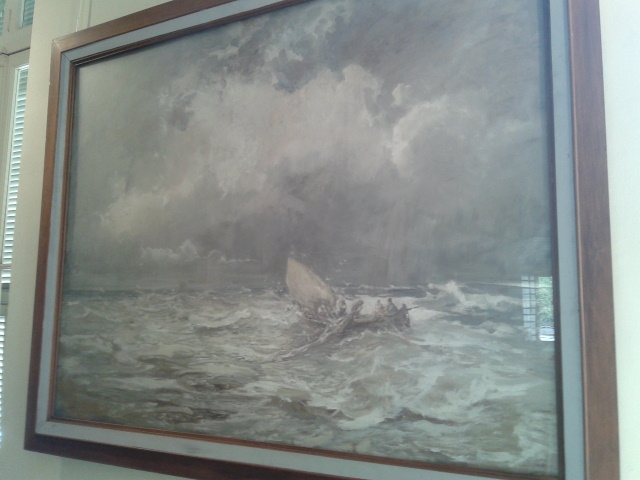
Burrasca a Bordighera, Pompeo Mariani 1915

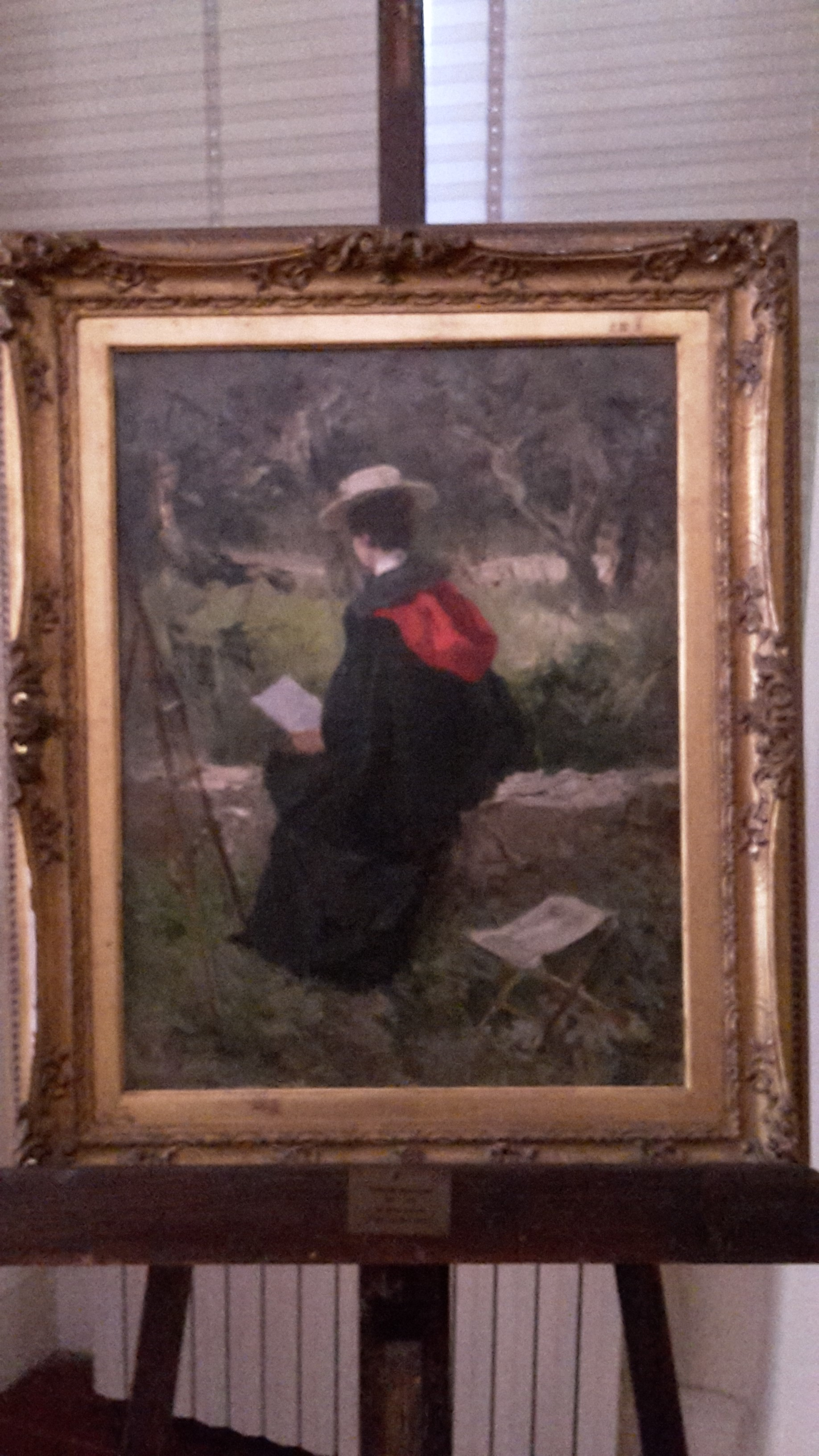
La Nana pittrice, Pompeo Mariani 1898

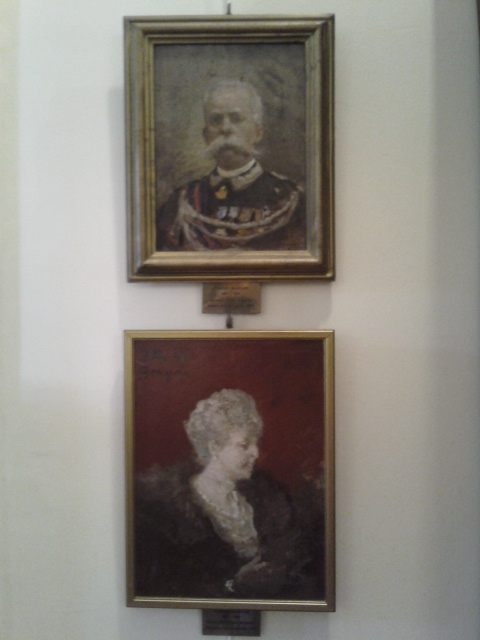
Portaraits of King Umberto I and Queen Margherita, Pompeo Mariani

== See also ==
- List of Orientalist artists
- Orientalism
