= Ludwig Winter =

German landscape architect (1846–1912)

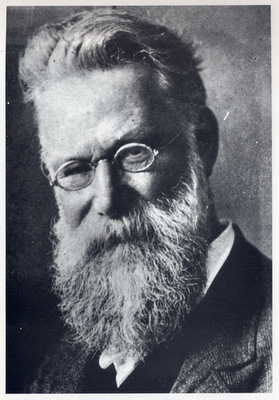
- Winter in 1905
- Born: August 9, 1846; Heidelberg, Prussia
- Died: 12 July 1912 (aged 65); Mannheim, Germany
- Occupation(s): Botanist, garden designer
- Known for: Giardini Botanici Hanbury

Ludwig Winter (August 9, 1846 – July 12, 1912) was a German botanist, nurseryman and landscape designer, creator of gardens such as the Giardini Botanici Hanbury, noted for introducing tall palms and other foreign species to the Ligurian riviera.

== Biography ==
Born in Prussia, the son of a bookseller, the family moved to Leipzig where he studied botany and became a gardener at Erfurt.

After two years at Erfurt he went to the School of Horticulture in Potsdam, graduating in Botanics, and then became head gardener at the Botanical Garden of Poppelsdorf near Bonn. In 1867 he went to the Paris World Exposition and settled there, working first as a labourer and then as head gardener in the Tuileries Garden.

As the Franco-Prussian War approached, the increasingly tense atmosphere in Paris forced Winter to move south via Marseilles and Cannes to Hyères in the Côte d'Azur, where he worked as a plant illustrator for Charles Huber Freres & Co, a prominent nursery and principal source of novelty plants during that period.

In 1869, Thomas Hanbury began work on his botanical gardens at Mortola and engaged Winter as a botanist. He devoted himself to this garden for five years, importing a wide variety of plants from Australia, New Zealand and California and acclimatising them to Liguria. When the work at Mortola was complete in 1874, Winter moved to Bordighera from where he designed and collaborated on many gardens, parks and nurseries on the Ligurian Riviera and the Costa Azzurra, as well as introducing and breeding roses, acacias and other flowers.

In 1875, he created an experimental nursery at Vallone del Sasso, where he brought a wealth of rare tropical plants including palms, lianas and ficus. He designed beautiful gardens, such as those for the Empress Eugenie at Cap Martin, Prince Hohenlohe in San Remo, the Countess Foucher de Careil in Mentone, Villa Zirio in San Remo, Villa Bischoffsheim in Bordighera and Borgo Storico Seghetti Panichi in Ascoli Piceno. The most celebrated is the Giardino di Madonna della Ruota, on the road between Bordighera and Ospedaletti.

== Gardens and parks ==
Five of Winter's gardens survive:

- Giardini Botanici Hanbury at Mortola, Ventimiglia
- La Madonna della Ruota, Bordighera
- Villa Wilmott, Imperia
- Winter Gardens, Vallone del Sasso, Bordighera
- Borgo Storico Seghetti Panichi, Ascoli Piceno

== Plant breeding ==
Hybrids bred by Winter include

- Acacia x deneufvillei, Acacia x hanburyana, Acacia x siebertiana
