= Riviera =

Riviera (pronounced [riˈvjɛːra]) is an Italian word which means 'coastline', ultimately derived from Latin rīpa, through Ligurian rivêa. It came to be applied as a proper name to the coast of Liguria (the Genoa region in northwestern Italy) in the form Riviera ligure, then shortened in English.

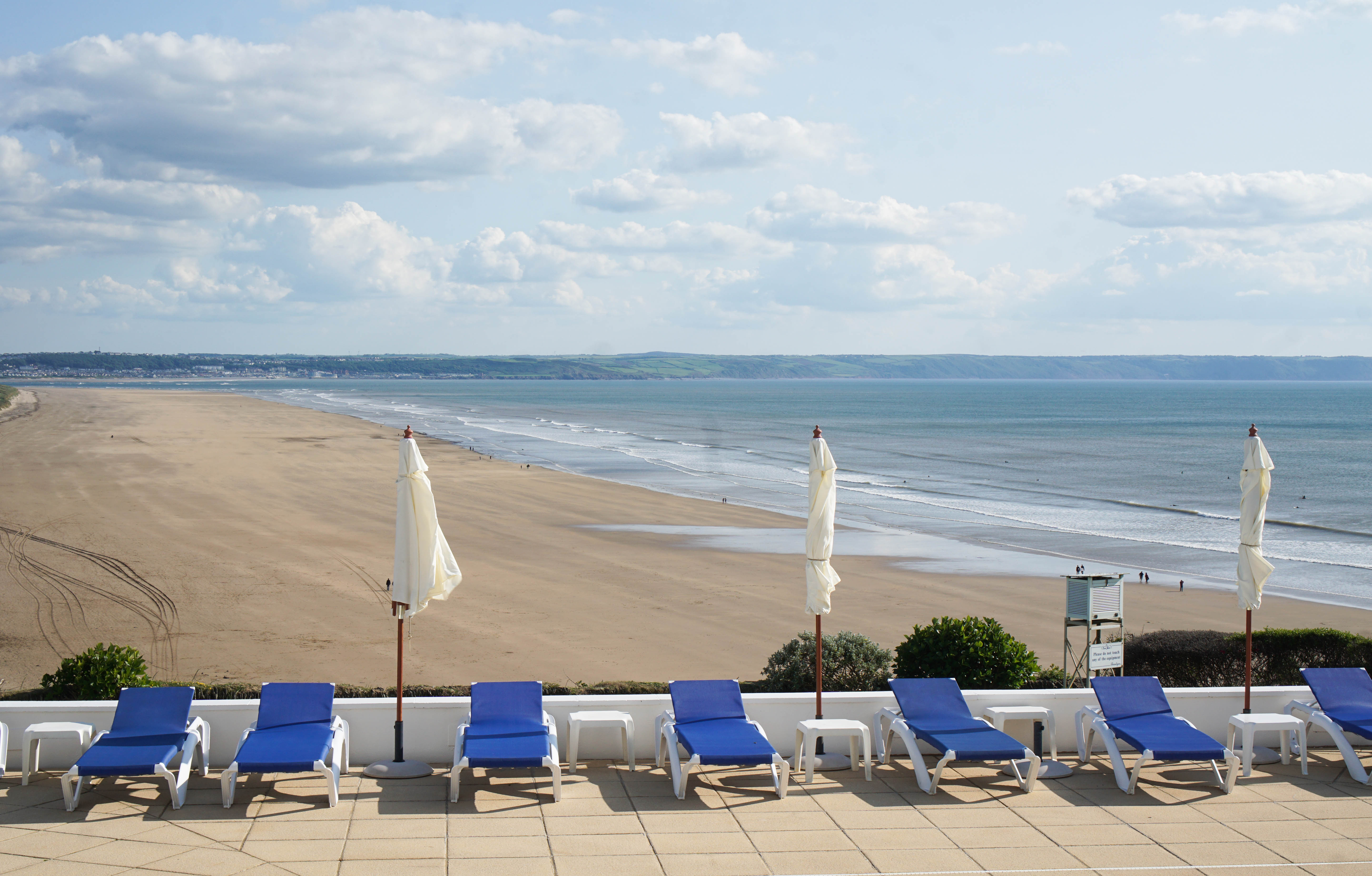
The English Riviera (Torbay): A popular tourist destination, Torbay's sandy beaches, mild climate, and recreational and leisure attractions have given rise to its nickname of the English Riviera.

Riviera may also refer to:

== Africa ==
- Kalk Bay Riviera (Riviera Kalk Bay or Coasta Kalk), to the west of Cape Town, South Africa
- Red Sea Riviera, the eastern shore of Egypt

== North America ==
=== Mexico ===
- Riviera Maya, the Caribbean coast of the Yucatán Peninsula
- Mexican Riviera, the southwestern coast of Mexico, including Acapulco
- Riviera Nayarit, another part of Pacific coast of Mexico

=== United States ===
- California Riviera, Santa Barbara, California
- Florida Riviera, Fort Lauderdale, Florida
- Florida Riviera, Sunny Isles Beach, Florida
- Irish Riviera, Scituate, Massachusetts
- Hollywood Riviera, a region of Redondo Beach, California

== Asia ==
- Bengali Riviera, coastal region in Cox's Bazar and St. Martin's Island in Bangladesh
- Chinese Riviera, coastal region in Zhuhai, China
- Philippine Riviera, often used to refer to northern coasts of Nasugbu, near Manila, including Punta Fuego and Hamilo Coast.
- Thai Riviera, stretching from Phetchaburi to Chumphon

== Europe ==
=== Central ===
- Riviera, a skyscraper in Warsaw, Poland

=== Eastern ===
- Bulgarian Black Sea Coast, also known as the Bulgarian Riviera, formerly part of the Red Riviera.
- Caucasian Riviera, of Russia and Georgia
- Southern Coast of Crimea, also known as "Crimean Riviera"
- Jurmala near Riga in Latvia, once known as the Baltic Riviera

=== Southern ===
- Albanian Riviera
- Athens Riviera, the Saronic Gulf coastline of Athens
- Budva Riviera, in Montenegro
- Italian Riviera (Riviera ligure), the coast of Liguria, northwestern Italy
- Makarska Riviera, in Croatia
- Portuguese Riviera (Riviera portuguesa, Costa do Sol or Costa do Estoril), along Estoril to the west of Lisbon
- Slovene Riviera
- Spanish Riviera (Costa del Sol), in Andalusia, southern Spain
- Turkish Riviera (Türk Rivierası), the southwestern coast of Turkey

=== Western ===
- English Riviera, Torbay
- Thames Riviera, an area of London, United Kingdom that includes Tagg's Island
- French Riviera (Côte d'Azur), the southeastern coast of France
- Swiss Riviera, on Lake Geneva, also known as Riviera vaudoise (Swiss Riviera may also refer to Quinten on the northern shore of Lake Walen)

== Former ==
- Austrian Riviera, former term used for the coastline of the defunct Austrian Empire
