= Istituto Internazionale di Studi Liguri =

Educational institution in Bordighera, Italy

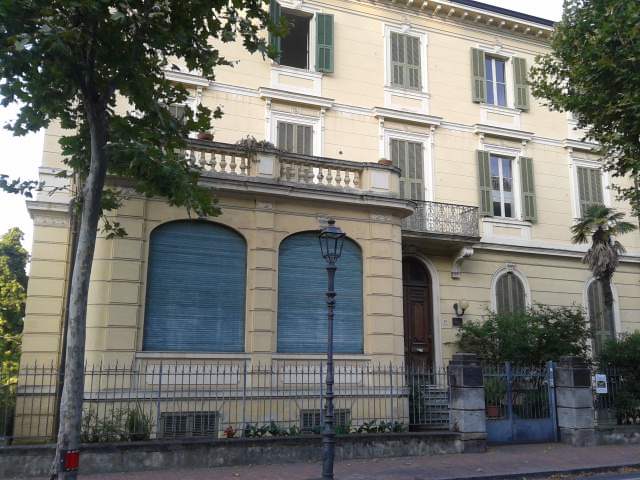
- Founders: Margaret Berry; Nino Lamboglia
- Established: 1937
- Focus: Ligurian studies
- Formerly called: Società Storico-Archeologica Ingauna e Intemelia
- Address: Via Romana 39
- Location: Bordighera, Imperia, Italy
- Coordinates: 43°46′55″N 7°40′04″E
- Interactive map of Istituto Internazionale di Studi Liguri
- Website: iisl.it

The Istituto Internazionale di Studi Liguri (Eng.: International Institute of Ligurian Studies) is an educational institution in Bordighera, Imperia, devoted to the study of the history of Liguria and all the coastal regions of the Mediterranean that were originally populated by the Ligurians. The building is located at Via Romana 39 and once housed the Hotel Scandinavia.

== History ==
The creation of the International Institute of Ligurian Studies is credited to the partnership between Margaret Berry and Nino Lamboglia. In 1888, Clarence Bicknell built the Bicknell Museum at Via Romana 39, and when he died in 1918, he left the museum to the municipality of Bordighera, which planned to relocate it. Bicknell's grandson Edward Elhanan Berry, together with his wife Margaret, fought to keep the museum intact, and after five years, the municipality withdrew its plans to rehouse it. Thus, in 1924, the museum was transformed into an independent institution and its collections, at the time essentially linked to botany and prehistory, were expanded to include local art, history, and traditions.

In 1932, the first historical association of the Italian Riviera, the Società Storico-Archeologica Ingauna e Intemelia (Ingauna and Intemelia Historico-Archaeological Society), was formed in Albenga. Margaret Berry, whose husband Edward had died in Rome in 1931, was one of the first members of the society, and in agreement with Professor Nino Lamboglia, she established the headquarters of the association at the Bicknell Museum.

The transformation of the Ingauna and Intemelia Historico-Archaeological Society into the Institute of Ligurian Studies took place in 1937, and Lamboglia became its manager. In 1947, the "international" epithet was added to the name, with the aim of strengthening cooperation between scholars on the Italo-French coast.

The institute currently has twenty-one sections, of which sixteen are in Italy, three in France, and two in Spain. In Italy, it is particularly active in Liguria, Piedmont, Lombardy, and northwestern Tuscany — these being the regions closely corresponding with the territories formerly populated by the Ligurians. In France, the institute is particularly active in the Rhone Valley and in general in the south of the country, within the borders of ancient Gallia Narbonensis.
