= International Civic Library =

- Biblioteca Civica Internazionale
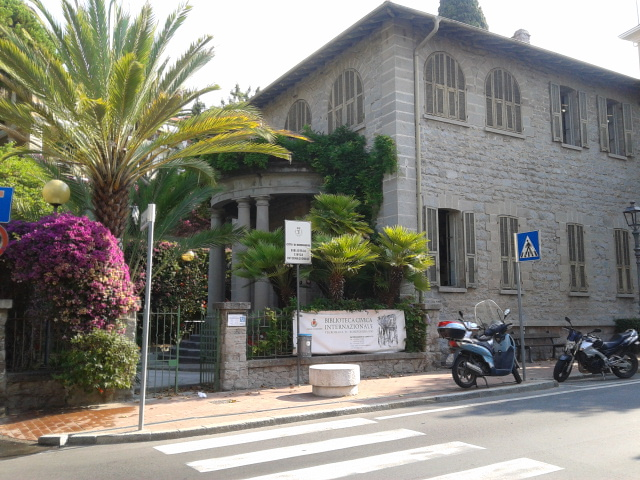
- International Civic Library, Bordighera
- Location: Bordighera, Italy
- Type: National library
- Established: 1910

Collection
- Items collected: Books, newspapers, magazines, databases, collection of digital pictures of Bordighera.
- Size: 60.000 books, 950 old digitized photos of the Victorian Bordighera.

Access and use
- Access requirements: Free access. Membership required for loans.

Other information
- Website: www.bordighera.it/cultura/biblioteca_civica

The International Civic Library of Bordighera is at 52 via Romana.

== History ==
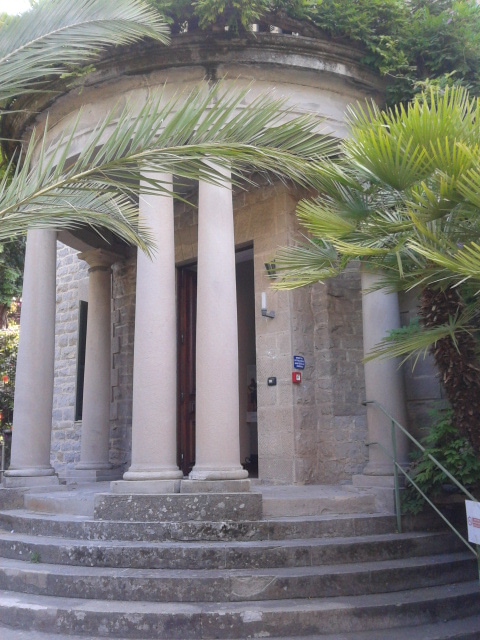
Entry of the International Civic Library

The first library of Bordighera was founded by the British in 1880 and was in the city’s Anglican Church.

In 1910, the British community decided to build a dedicated library on Via Romana to host a growing collection. Funds were gathered by Clarence Bicknell, who designed a Victorian stone building with a façade embellished by a semi-circular portico, supported by six columns, and made even more beautiful by the presence of a wisteria now centenary.

After the Second World War, the library was bought by the city of Bordighera and restored in 1985 by the Genoese architect Gianfranco Franchini, particularly known for his work with Renzo Piano at the Centre Pompidou of Paris. The library boasts the title of "International" because it has a collection of about 40,000 volumes in Italian, 20,000 in English, 6,000 in French and 3,000 in German. The library also has a collection of about 950 old, digitized photos of the Victorian Bordighera.
