= Fielding-Druce Herbarium =

Herbarium at Oxford University, UK

- Established: 1621
- Focus: Collection of about 1,000,000 botanic specimens, of which there are at least 35,000 types.
- Head: Dr. Stephen Harris
- Faculty: Department of Plant Sciences, University of Oxford
- Address: South Parks Road, Oxford
- Location: Oxford, Oxfordshire, England
- Website: Fielding-Druce Herbarium

Account of the Herbarium of the University of Oxford by George Claridge Druce in 1897

Fielding-Druce Herbarium, part of the Department of Biology, University of Oxford, located on South Parks Road, in Oxford, England. A herbarium is a collection of herbarium sheets, with a dried pressed specimen of the botanic species, whether they were bound into a book by one dedicated individual, or have been amassed into huge collections. They are like plant ID cards. As paper was expensive, multiple specimens are normally mounted on one sheet. The 2 cores of the Herbarium collection, are bequeathed to the University from Henry Fielding (1805-1851) containing a non-British and Irish collection. It also covers most taxonomic groups and geographical areas. It is particularly rich in nineteenth century material from the Americas and south and south east Asia. The other core a British and Irish collection from George Claridge Druce (1850-1932) in 1932, this is particularly rich in specimens from Oxfordshire, Buckinghamshire and Berkshire. Other collections were added later.

== History ==
It was established in 1621, they include the oldest herbarium in the United Kingdom and the fourth oldest herbarium in the world. Collectively, they hold approximately 1,000,000 botanical specimens (including at least 35,000 types) from across all taxonomic groups and geographic regions. Four of the more significant pre-19th century herbaria are those of Robert Morison, William Sherard, Johannus Dillenius and John Sibthorp. The earliest collected plant specimens dates back to around 1606.

== The collection ==
It includes collections from;

- Robert Morison (1620-83); who became the first professor of botany in 1669, a post that he held until 1683. He had written several books on Botany.
- William Sherard (1659-1728),(Sherardian Library of Plant Taxonomy) and The Sherard herbarium; he was endowed the Oxford University Chair of Botany. On his death in 1728, he left the university £3000 for the endowment of the chair, as well as his library and the herbarium. all on the condition that Dillenius should be appointed the first professor. He also left his herbarium of 12,000 sheets and his library and paintings.
- Johann Jacob Dillenius (1684-1747), Dillenius's Historia Muscorum; German born but then moved to the UK. In 1734 Dillenius was appointed Sherardian professor of botany at Oxford. His manuscripts, books and collections of dried plants, with many drawings, were bought by his successor at Oxford, Dr. Humphry Sibthorp (1713–1797), and ultimately passed into the possession of Oxford University. In 1907, G. Claridge Druce described The Dillenian Herbaria.
- John Sibthorp (1758-1796), The Sipthorpian herbarium, His herbarium (of three collections; contains 2,462 Flora Graeca specimens, 70 Flora Oxoniensis specimens and 444 miscellaneous specimens) are stored within the Fielding-Druce Herbarium.
- William Dampier (c. 1697–1698); The first scientific collection of flora from Western Australia was by William Dampier near Shark Bay and in the Dampier Archipelago in 1699. Then when his ship the Roebuck was wrecked on Ascension Island, he saved his plant collection to give to the herbarium. It contains 24 sheets of Australian plant specimens. In September 1999, they were then loaned to Western Australia for the 300 year celebration.
- Jacob Bobart the Younger (2 August 1641 – 28 December 1719); in 1683, he lectured as botanical professor at Oxford. In 1699 he brought out the third part of Morison's Historia Plantarum,
- Charles du Bois (bap. 1658-1740); a treasurer of the English East India Company, du Bois used his connections to members of London's botanical circle, including Hans Sloane, James Petiver, and Leonard Plukenet to amass a collection of more than 14,000 specimens. His most significant partnership was with the surgeon Edward Bulkley, who was stationed at the Company factory of Fort St. George. As a result, over a quarter of the collection was sourced using du Bois's East India contacts, and many contain vernacular Tamil names.
- Mark Catesby (24 March 1683 – 23 December 1749); an English naturalist who studied flora and fauna in the New World. He was recommended by William Sherard to collect. Between 1729 and 1747 Catesby published his Natural History of Carolina, Florida and the Bahama Islands, the first published account of the flora and fauna of North America.
- Aylmer Bourke Lambert (2 February 1761 – 10 January 1842); a British botanist, one of the first fellows of the Linnean Society. He had acquired a number of significant herbarium collections including those of Johann Reinhold Forster, Archibald Menzies and Henry de Ponthieu. When he died his collection of 50,000 preserved plant specimens, was auctioned in 317 lots and now specimens can be found in botanical collections around the world. Including Kew, St Petersburg, Berlin and Oxford.
- James Eustace Bagnall (7 November 1830 – 3 September 1918); he made important contributions to the Floras of the counties surrounding his home in Birmingham. One of his earliest publications, in 1874, was a moss Flora of Warwickshire. His herbarium and papers are held by the Library of Birmingham. National Museum Cardiff has 125 of his bryological specimens. Other herbaria hold specimens he collected (including the Fielding-Druce Herbarium)
- Clarence Bicknell (1842-1918); a British vicar, amateur archaeologist, botanist, artist, Esperantist, author and philanthropist. He founded the Bicknell Museum in Bordighera, Italy. He had collected up to 100 specimens from Italy, Majorca and Corfu.
- Maria Antonina Czaplicka (25 October 1884 – 27 May 1921); collected 47 botanical specimens in Siberia for the herbarium

== Former Staff ==
- Frank White, (born in Sunderland 5 March 1927; Demonstrator in Forest Botany, Oxford University 1948-55, University Lecturer 1955-94, Curator, Forest Herbarium 1961-92, Curator, Fielding-Druce Herbarium 1971-92, Distinguished Research Curator, Oxford University Herbaria 1992-94; died in Oxford 12 September 1994). In 1971, White was established as the Curator of the Oxford University herbaria, the Forest Herbarium and the Fielding-Druce Herbarium. These herbaria collections formed the majority of his own research, and while some of his curatorial duties were neglected in the process, he achieved a great deal of work.
