= Nino Lamboglia =

Italian archaeologist (1912–1977)

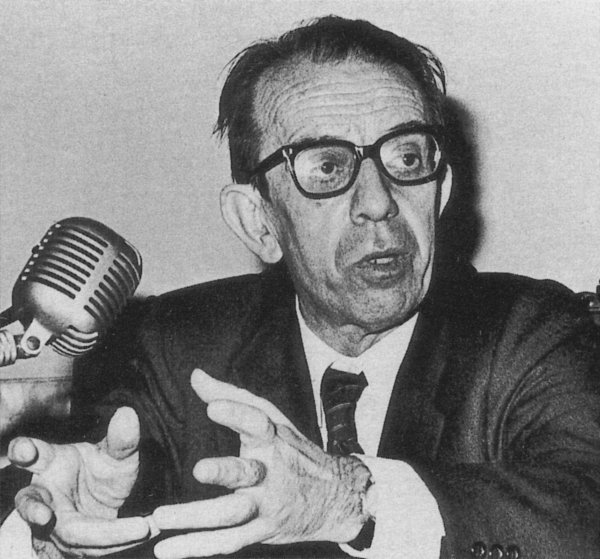
- Lamboglia in 1972
- Born: Giovanni Lamboglia; 7 August 1912; Porto Maurizio (now part of Imperia), Italy
- Died: 10 January 1977 (aged 64); Genoa, Italy
- Education: University of Genoa
- Scientific career
- Fields: Archaeology
- Workplaces: Istituto Internazionale di Studi Liguri; University of Genoa
- Academic advisors: Giovanni Niccolini

Giovanni "Nino" Lamboglia (7 August 1912 – 10 January 1977) was an Italian archaeologist. In 1942 he established the Istituto Internazionale di Studi Liguri at Bordighera and directed it until his death, developing it into a leading centre for the study of ancient Liguria. He introduced stratigraphic excavation into Italian classical archaeology and worked out a chronology of Roman pottery, including classifications of Campanian black-gloss ware and of late Roman red-slip ware that remained attached to his name. From 1950 he was among the first to carry out underwater excavation in the Mediterranean, and throughout his career he was active in protecting and restoring the monuments of Liguria.

== Life ==
=== Early life and education ===
Lamboglia was born on 7 August 1912 at Porto Maurizio, a town that in 1923 was merged with Oneglia to form Imperia. He was the son of a schoolteacher. At the age of seventeen he published his first paper, on a Roman inscription from Villa Faraldi. He graduated in letters at the University of Genoa in 1933 with a thesis in archaeology, discussed under the ancient historian Giovanni Niccolini.

=== Ligurian studies before the Second World War ===
In 1932 Lamboglia was among the founders of the Società Storico-Archeologica Ingauna at Albenga, which grew into the Istituto Internazionale di Studi Liguri, established at Bordighera in 1942. He based the institution at the Museo Bicknell in Bordighera, and through it and its predecessor society he founded and edited several scholarly journals and monograph series, among them the Rivista di Studi Liguri, published from 1934. He also directed the municipal library of Albenga from 1934 to 1937, reopening it after a long closure. From 1938 he began excavating the Roman town of Albintimilium at Ventimiglia, where he treated the pottery as a chronological guide and drew up the first typology of Campanian black-gloss ware. He defined his research area as prehistoric and Roman Liguria in the wide sense, between the Rhône and the eastern Apennines.

=== Second World War ===
During and after the war Lamboglia organised the protection of the artworks, antiquities and library collections of western Liguria, including those of the Biblioteca Aprosiana of Ventimiglia, whose reorganisation he directed in the early 1950s. After Italy entered the war in June 1940 he took part in the Italian nationalist and irredentist campaign directed at Nice and Menton. He circulated propaganda under the transparent pseudonym "Nino Lamlia", including the 1940 pamphlet Ritorno a Mentone italiana, was involved in setting up the Italian administration of occupied Menton, and issued through the Institute studies supporting Italian claims in the county of Nice. He later described these writings as a youthful error.

During the Italian occupation of Nice, from November 1942 to September 1943, he began the first modern excavations at Cemenelum in Cimiez. The 1943 campaign ended on 20 July, when a Resistance attack seriously wounded him and the co-director Maria Vittoria Sardino. After the fall of the Fascist regime this political material disappeared from the institute's publications and he returned to impartial scholarship, though he remained unwelcome at Nice until the late 1950s.

=== Later career and death ===
Lamboglia became inspector and then adjunct superintendent of the Superintendency of Antiquities of Liguria, and from the 1950s he directed excavations in Liguria, Sicily and Rome. In 1970 he was appointed lecturer in medieval archaeology at the University of Genoa. He belonged to the Società Ligure di Storia Patria from 1931 and to the Ligurian Academy of Sciences and Letters, and was a corresponding member of the National Institute of Roman Studies. He died in a car accident in the port of Genoa on 10 January 1977.

== Archaeological work ==
=== Stratigraphy and the chronology of Roman pottery ===
At Albintimilium and other Ligurian sites Lamboglia developed a stratigraphic method of excavation, recording deposits in sequence rather than searching selectively for finds, and this approach became influential in Italian archaeology. He was a specialist in Roman ceramics. His study of the chronology of Roman pottery appeared in a definitive edition in 1950, and he produced classifications of terra sigillata and of Campanian ware, the late Roman red-slip series in particular remaining attached to his name.

=== Underwater archaeology ===
In 1950 Lamboglia undertook the excavation of a Roman shipwreck off Albenga, one of the first archaeological interventions on a submerged wreck in the Mediterranean. With French and Spanish colleagues he set up a permanent international body for the charting of underwater sites, the Forma Maris Antiqui, and he commanded the first vessels fitted out for the work, the corvette Daino, which he obtained from the Italian Navy, and later the former trawler Cycnus. He founded the Roman Naval Museum and a centre for underwater archaeology at Albenga, and organised a series of international congresses on the subject, held at Albenga in 1958, Barcelona in 1961, Nice in 1970 and Lipari in 1976.

=== Heritage protection and restoration ===
From 1951 Lamboglia turned increasingly to the restoration of the major monuments of Liguria, among them the 5th-century baptistery and the Gothic cathedral of Albenga and the cathedral and baptistery of Ventimiglia. He directed the reconstruction of the prehistory museum at the Balzi Rossi between 1946 and 1954, the restoration of the museum of Ventimiglia from 1950, and from 1960 the management of the Hanbury botanical garden at La Mortola.

== Legacy ==
Lamboglia's stratigraphic method and his ceramic chronologies became reference points for Roman archaeology, and his pottery type-series continued in use after his death. A commemorative congress, "I Liguri dall'Arno all'Ebro", was held in his memory at Albenga in 1982. The Istituto Internazionale di Studi Liguri, which he had led for over thirty years, has continued its activity.

== Selected works ==
- Topografia storica dell'Ingaunia nell'antichità (1933)
- Il trofeo di Augusto alla Turbia (1938)
- La Liguria antica (1941)
- Gli scavi di Albintimilium e la cronologia della ceramica romana (1950)
- Per una classificazione preliminare della ceramica campana (1952)
- Albenga romana e medievale (1957)

== Bibliography ==
- Compan, Michel (2000). "Un archéologue de la Ligurie: Nino Lamboglia (1912–1977)" (PDF). Archéam (7). Cercle d'Histoire et d'Archéologie des Alpes-Maritimes: 49–52.
- "Lambòglia, Nino". Enciclopedia on line. Rome: Istituto dell'Enciclopedia Italiana.
- Petrucciani, Alberto (2003) [first published 19 July 2003; updated 1 May 2020]. "Lamboglia, Nino". Dizionario bio-bibliografico dei bibliotecari italiani del XX secolo. Associazione italiana biblioteche.
