= Anglican Church (disambiguation) =

Anglican Church ("English Church") refers to Christian churches in the Anglican tradition.

Anglican Church may refer to:

- The Church of England, mother church of the Anglican Communion
- The Anglican Communion or one of its member churches worldwide, including:
  - Anglican Church of Australia
  - Anglican Church of Canada
  - Anglican Church in Aotearoa, New Zealand and Polynesia
- Anglican Church (Bordighera), in Italy
- Anglican Church (Bucharest), in Romania
- Anglican realignment
- Continuing Anglican movement
