= Joseph Hogarth =

British print publisher and retailer

Joseph Hogarth (1801-1879) was a British fine art print publisher, print seller, frame maker and art restorer. He operated from various locations in central London in the middle decades of the nineteenth century. He was working in the field by 1826 and the business continued to operate till 1890, by which time it was under the direction of his two sons.

== Early life ==
Joseph Hogarth is believed to have been the son of Joseph and Ann Hogarth. He was born in London and christened at St Pancras Old Church in 1801.

He was living at 30 Denton St, Somers Town, London, by 1826, at which time he was described as a "print colourer and mounter." He married Ellen Taylor in 1827 at St Luke's, Finsbury. The couple had at least four children. Residential directories indicate the couple lived at 11 Somers Town Terrace from 1828 till 1832 by which time he was described as a "print colourer, artist and stationer."

When his daughter Anne was christened in 1834 he was operating from 60 Great Portland Street as a printseller. Occupational directories describe him as a "mounter and inlayer of prints and drawings" by 1839. He described himself as a 39-year-old "print mounter" in the 1841 census. The 1851 census notes that he and his family were living above their gallery in the Haymarket. It was located just a few doors away from the Haymarket Theatre. The business is known to have operated, as Joseph Hogarth, or, Joseph Hogarth & Sons, from the following locations in London.

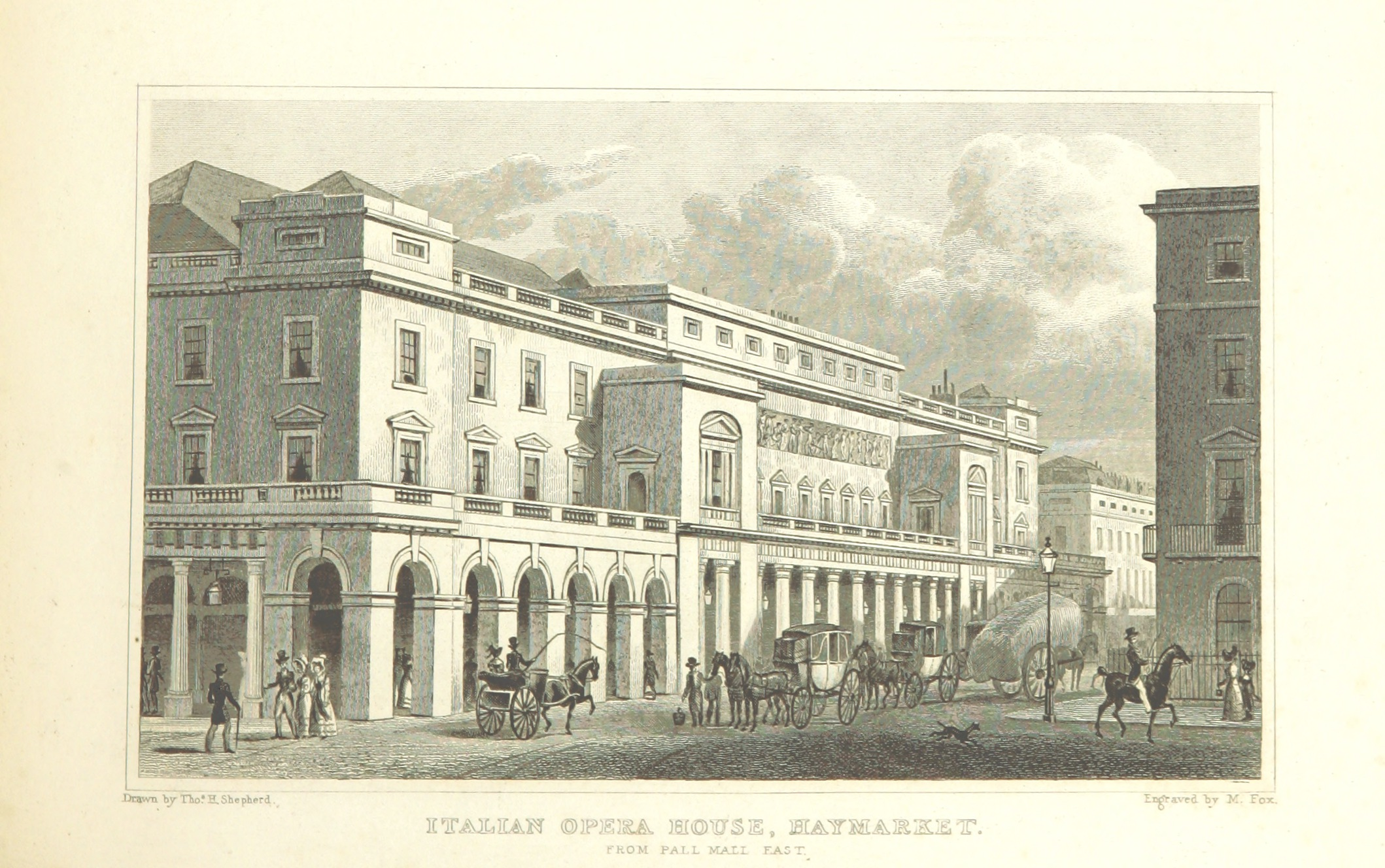
Haymarket, London, 19th century

- New Road, opposite St Pancras Church (1832)
- 60 Great Portland Street (1835-1845)
- 5 Haymarket, London (1845-1866)
- 96 Mount Street, Grovesnor Square (1866-1886)
- 473 Oxford Street (1887-1890)

The 1861 census reveals the business was still operating from a gallery at 5 Haymarket in the centre of London. It had twelve employees, including Hogarth's two daughters and his son, George. His transition from a print colourer and framer to a publisher and seller of quality high-art prints was facilitated by his business partnership with the London merchant Elhanan Bicknell.

== Elhanan Bicknell ==
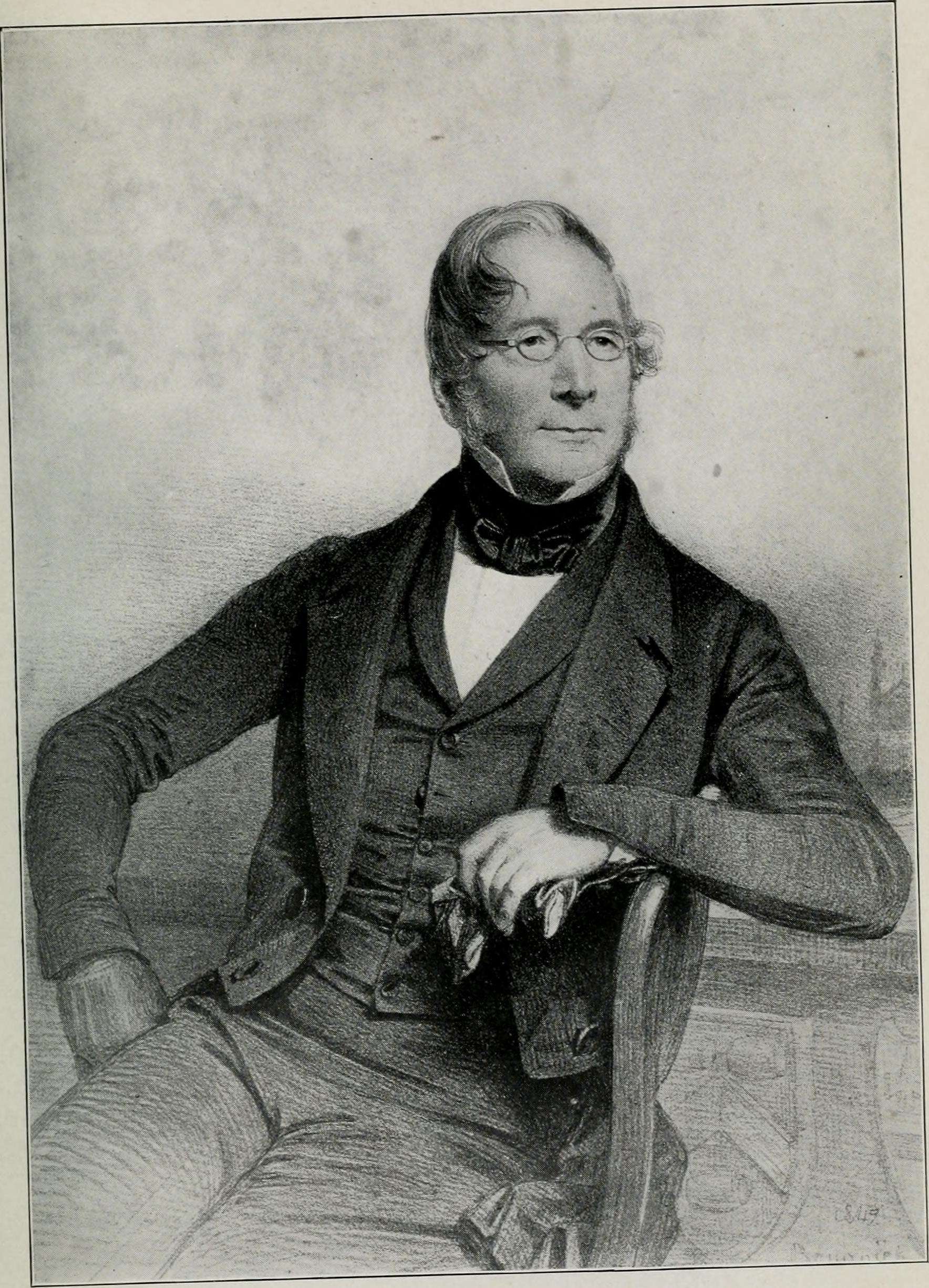
Elhanan Bicknell, 1850s

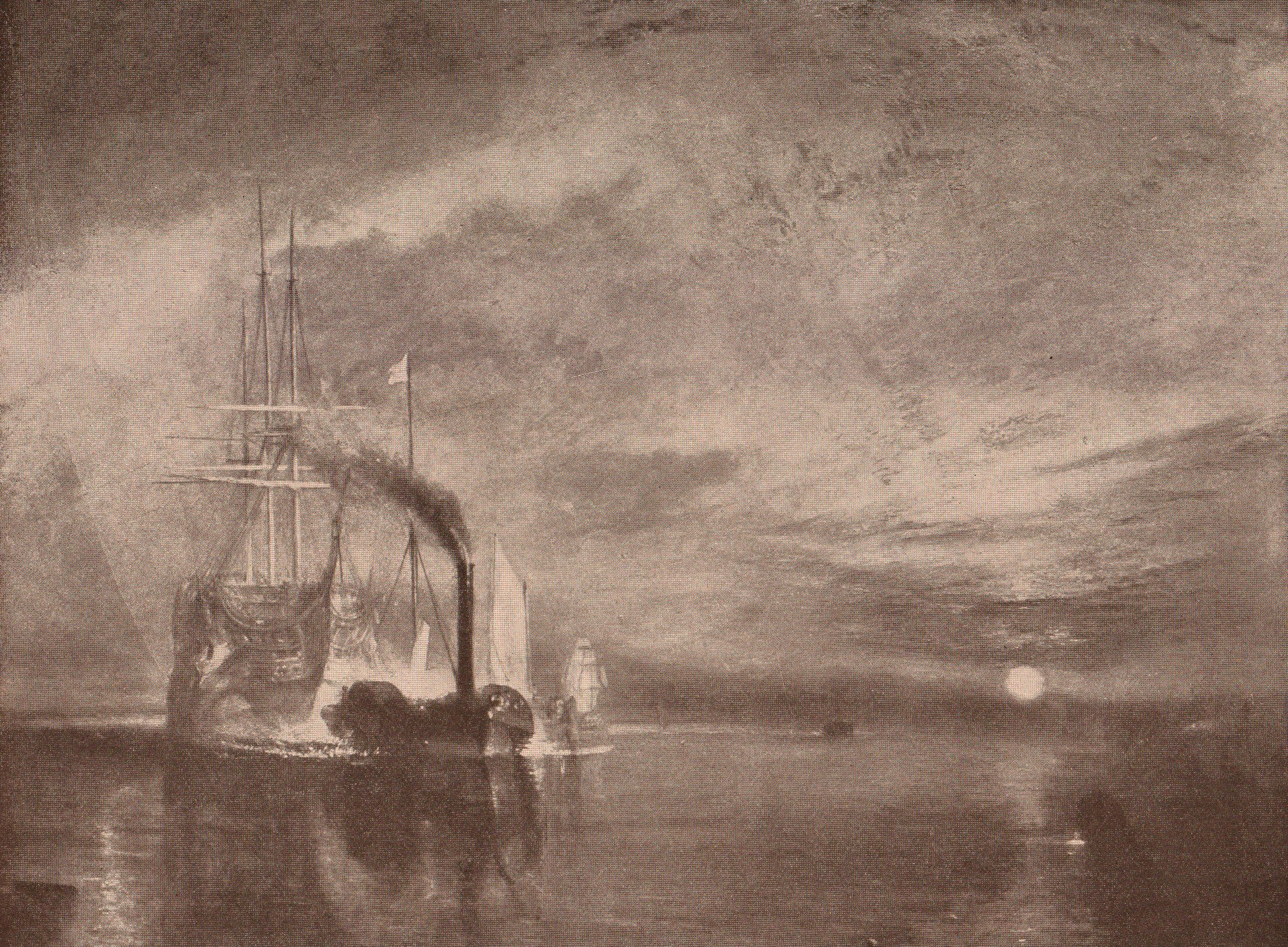
The lithograph of J. M. W. Turner's, The Fighting Temeraire, the engraving of which was financed by Bicknell

Elhanan Bicknell (1788-1861) was a successful London businessman and patron of the arts. He began to collect contemporary British art in 1828, often buying direct from the artists rather than from galleries. He would have needed the services of someone to mount and frame his paintings and drawings and this probably brought him into contact with Hogarth. Bicknell was a silent partner in a number of promising commercial enterprises, only becoming directly involved in order to resolve some pressing financial or legal issue. This pattern seems to have been repeated in his association with Hogarth. The partnership began about 1832 and continued till August 1854 when it was formally dissolved.

One of the first fruits of this association was, The works of William Hogarth; in a series of one hundred and fifty steel engravings, by the first artists, with descriptions and a comment on their moral tendency, Vol. 1, a 64-page volume published by Joseph Hogarth and others in 1833. It is unclear if there is a family connection between Joseph Hogarth and the artist William Hogarth.

There is little doubt that Bicknell's financial backing allowed Hogarth to move from colouring and framing prints to the more capital intensive business of commissioning and publishing high-quality engraving and lithographic prints which he then sold in his gallery. The two men also seem to have been friends as Hogarth named one his sons George Bicknell Hogarth.

As well as buying original art works, Bicknell encouraged artists he favoured by funding prints of their works. One notable example is J. M. W. Turner's painting, The Fighting Temeraine (1838) which Bicknell paid to have engraved and printed.

== High-art reproductions ==
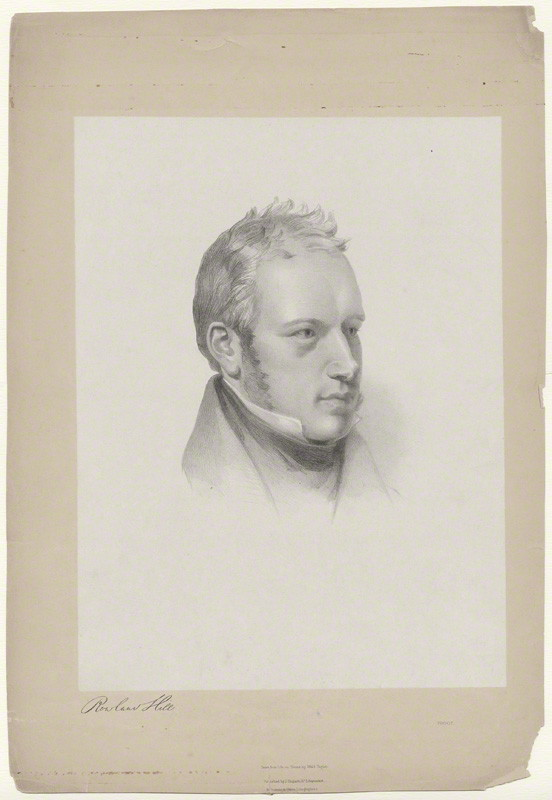
Lithograph of Sir Rowland Hill, published by Joseph Hogarth, mid 19th century

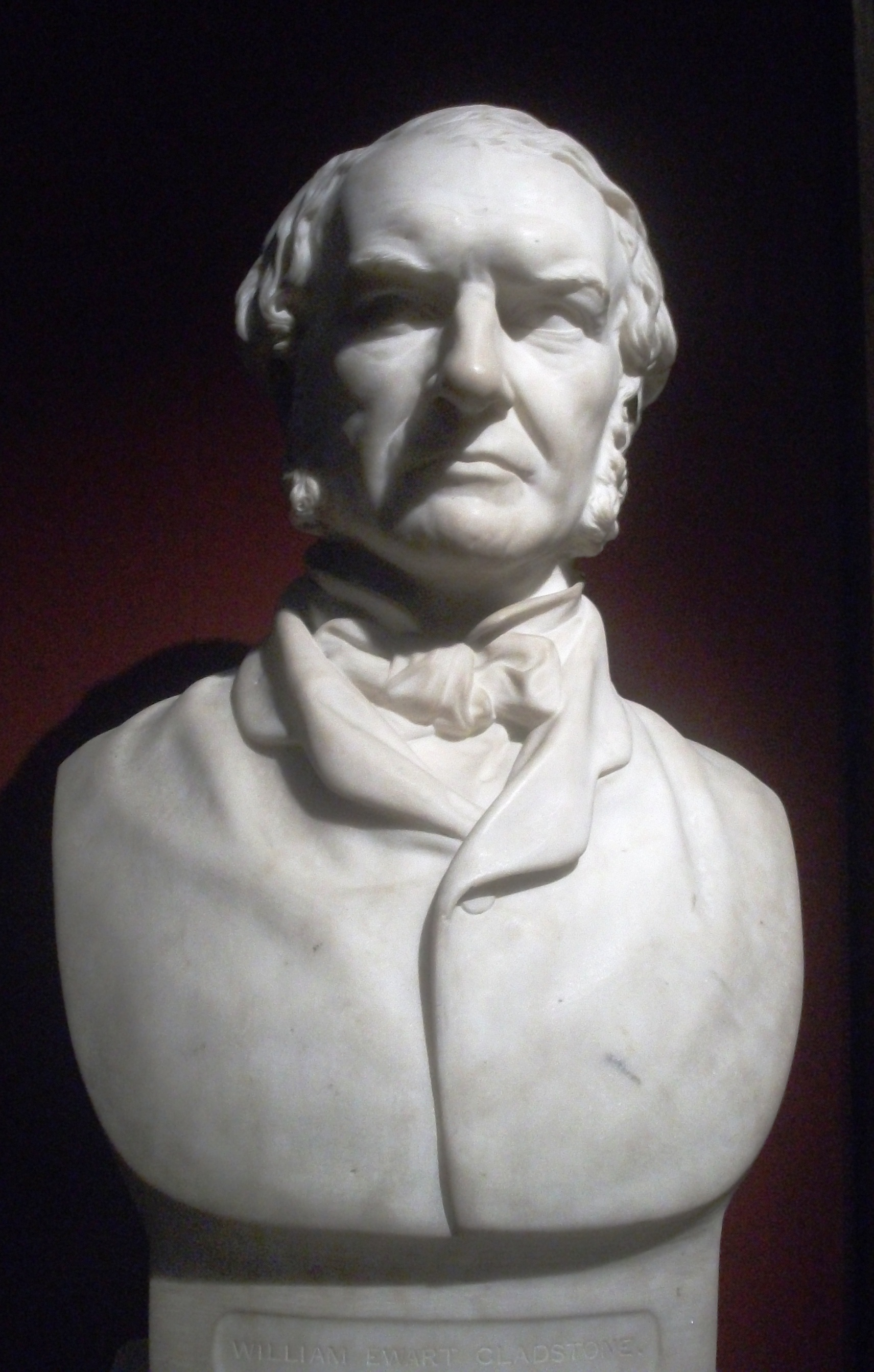
Hogarth sold high-quality glazed porcelain busts of British Prime Minister William Gladstone. They were based on this original marble bust of Gladstone by sculptor Thomas Woolner

A billhead for the business indicates Hogarth was regularly publishing reproductions of paintings and drawings by 1848. Royal patronage could enhance a firms status and an 1864 letterhead says Hogarth was print-seller and picture-frame maker to the Prince of Wales. As well as selling framed high-art prints to aristocrats and the wealthy, many others visited his gallery. Among these was Charles Dickens and Florence Nightingale.

Hogarth provided his services to public art galleries. He was asked to frame some drawings by George Richmond for the National Portrait Gallery. In 1862 he was employed to repair, mount, frame and glaze drawings in the collection of the Bodleian Library, Oxford. He was also employed to repair and restore damaged prints, paintings and maps in public and private collections. In the 1860s Hogarth mounted, framed, and cleaned various works by artist John Constable for his son Charles Golding Constable. A trade card from the 1870s promote the services of Hogarth & Sons as picture restorers.

The firm had a major clearance sale of prints, books of prints and water-colour drawings in 1854. These were sold at auctions held over 18 evenings in June 1854. Among the publications offered for sale was the entire remaining stock of Finden's Royal Gallery of British Art (1838-40). After the auction, the 48 engraved plates used to produce the illustrations were destroyed in the presence of the purchasers in order to increase the value of those just sold and reduce the possibility of low quality pirated copies being produced.

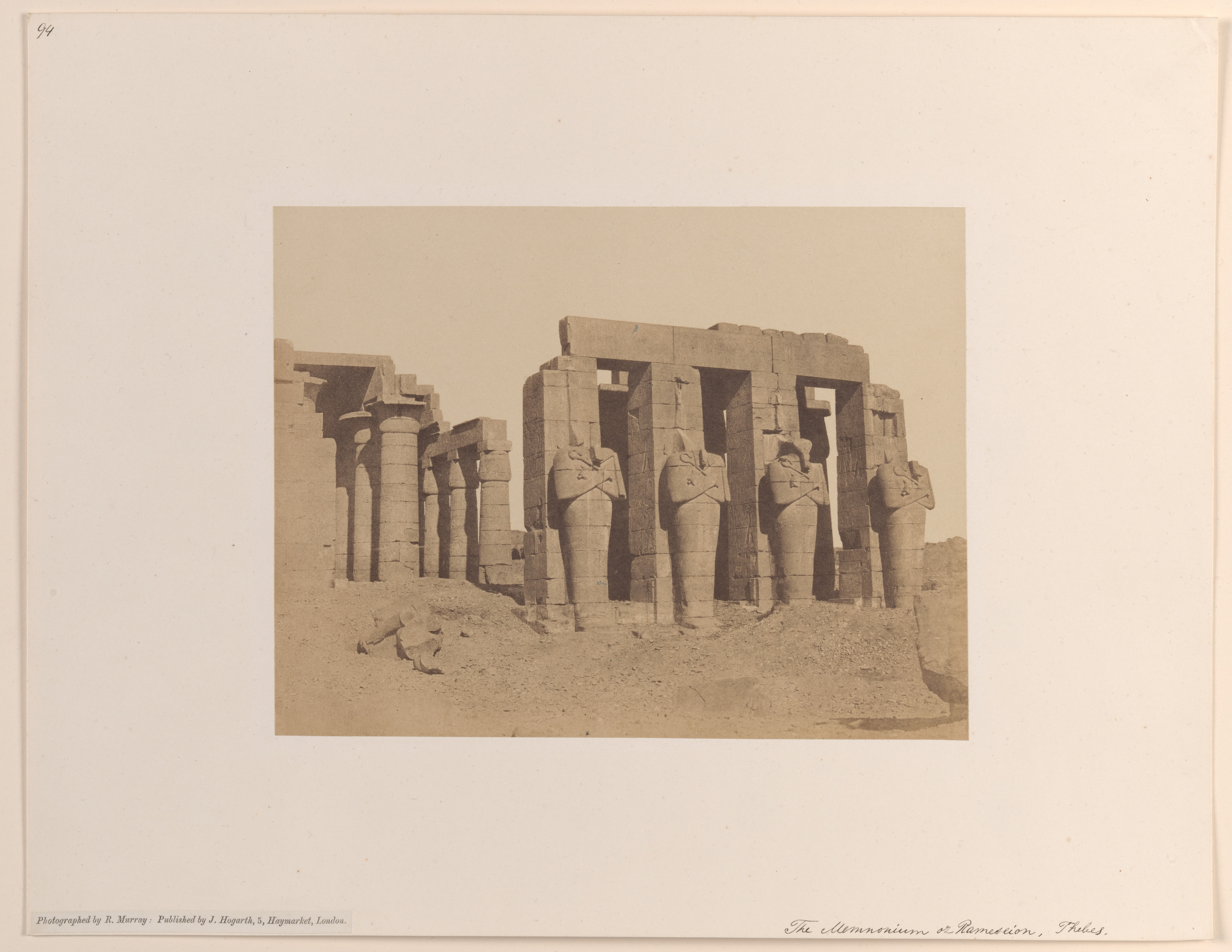
Robert Murray (photographer), "The Memnonium or Rameseiom, Thebes," published by J. Hogarth, 5 Haymarket, 1854-1856

Pirated copies of original art works were a problem for high-end dealers like Hogarth. Such copies were often shoddy and sold at prices that undercut legitimate galleries who only sold registered copies, the price of which included a royalty paid to the original artist.

In the 1860s, Hogarth was the sole London agent for Staffordshire potter John Stark who produced, among other things, ceramic copies of a bust of British Prime Minister William Gladstone by sculptor Thomas Woolner. Pirated copies of the bust were common and in 1866 Joseph and Andrew Hogarth had a physical altercation with a producer of such pirated copies when he was seen passing their gallery with an arm full of busts, including one of Gladstone.

Hogarth also purchased original works of art. These may have been bought to re-sell, to be engraved or to become part of his own private collection. He owned at least one painting by J. M. W. Turner and another by George Romney He sold one portfolio of drawings by William Blake to John Ruskin.

The rise of photography saw the firm in the 1850s begin to publish and offer for sale albums of high quality photographs of landscapes, buildings and people.

Joseph Hogarth died in October 1879 and he was buried on the western side of Highgate Cemetery. After his death his sons took over the business.

== Second generation ==
George Bicknell Hogarth (1844-1890) was named in the 1871 census as a dealer in works of art from 96 Mount Street. The business mounted a collection of portrait drawings by Sir Francis Chantrey for the National Portrait Gallery in the late 1880s. On the letterheads of their business papers at the time the firm noted that their services included, "Specially prepared hand made mounts, free from all chemical & other impurities, for the preservation of water colour drawings." George and Andrew David Hogarth were trading as J. Hogarth & Sons, picture dealers of 473 Oxford Street when the firm became bankrupt in 1890. Andrew Hogarth (1847-1906) later traded from 196 Goldhawk Road, Shepherd's Bush.

== Legacy ==
Joseph Hogarth was a leading publisher and retailer of high quality reproductions of paintings, drawings, busts and photographs in London in the middle decades of the nineteenth century. The central locations of his various galleries, the longevity of the business and the value of Hogarth's estate (£6,441) at his death in 1879 suggest the business was well patronised.

Hogarth produced reproductions of art works for the general public. Prints, books of prints, and photographs published by Hogarth are held in public and private collections where they are used for research.

Hogarth may have been the originator of a type of black-and-gilt frame called the Hogarth frame.
