= Elhanan Bicknell =

British businessman and shipowner (1788-1861)

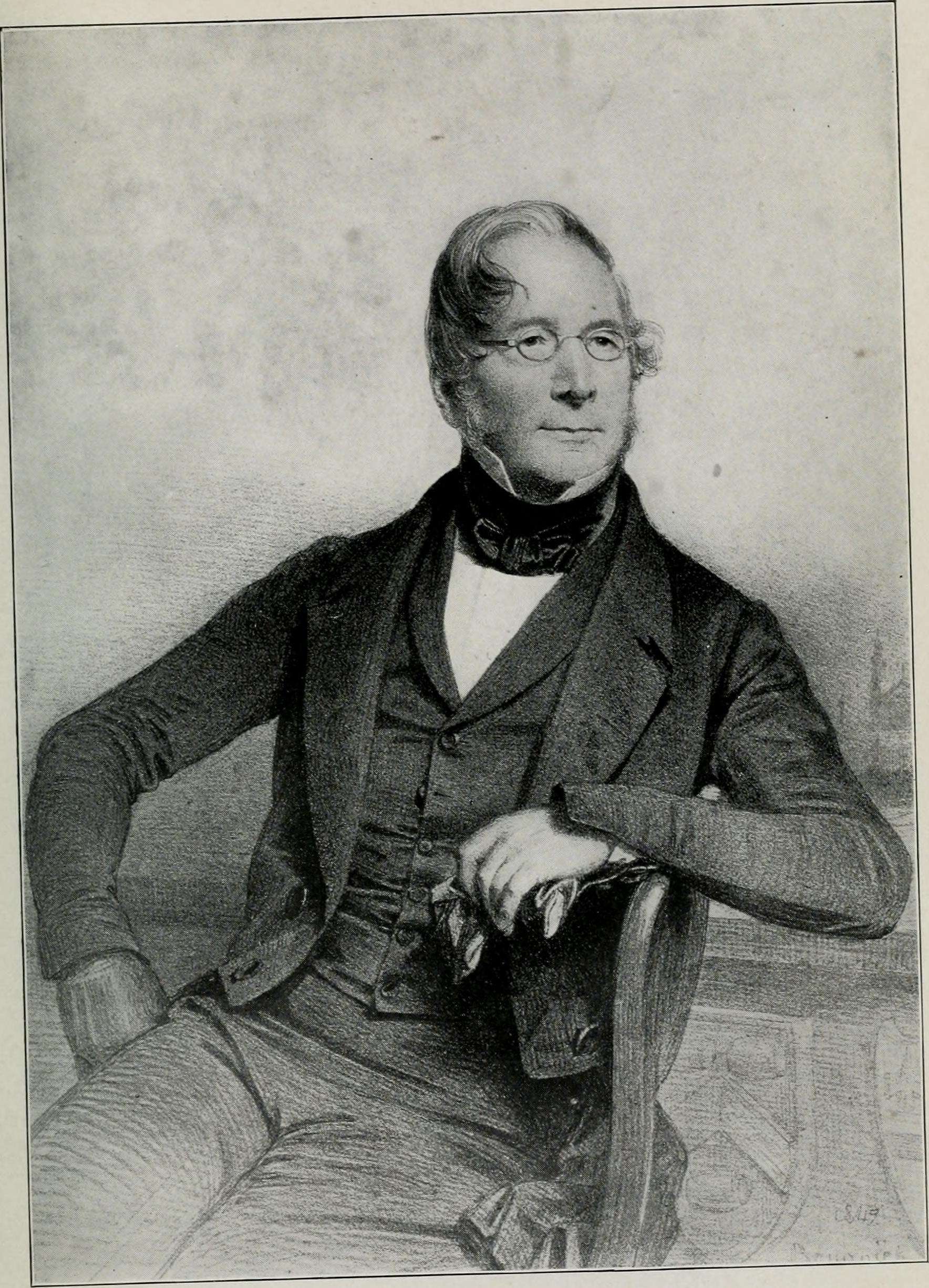
- Elhanan Bicknell
- Born: 21 December 1788; Blackman Street, London
- Died: 27 November 1861 (aged 72); Herne Hill, London
- Occupations: Businessman and shipowner
- Years active: 1809-1861
- Children: Elhanan Bicknell, Herman Bicknell, Clarence Bicknell
- Parent(s): William Bicknell, Elizabeth Bicknell

Elhanan Bicknell (21 December 1788 – 27 November 1861) was a successful London businessman and shipowner. He used his wealth as a patron of the arts, becoming one of the leading collectors of contemporary British art.

== Early life ==
Elhanan Bicknell was born 21 December 1788, in Blackman Street, London, the son of William Bicknell, serge manufacturer, and Elizabeth Bicknell, née Randall, of Sevenoaks, Kent.

His father had attended John Wesley's school at Kingswood, Bristol, and entertained Wesley in Blackman Street when he came to preach at Snow's Fields in Southwark. Another minister who was a family friend was Elhanan Winchester, author of Universal Restoration; after whom the son was named. William Bicknell bought the copyright of this work in the year of his son Elhanan's birth, and on finding that he had made money on the deal, gave it back to the author in 1789.

Elhanan Bicknell was educated by his father, who, having established a school at Ponder's End in 1789, when Elhanan was an infant, removed it to Tooting Common in 1804; and there among Elhanan's schoolfellows, was Thomas Wilde, afterwards Lord Chancellor Truro.

In 1808 Bicknell was sent to Caus Castle, near Shrewsbury, to learn farming; but at the end of a year this project was abandoned.

== In business ==
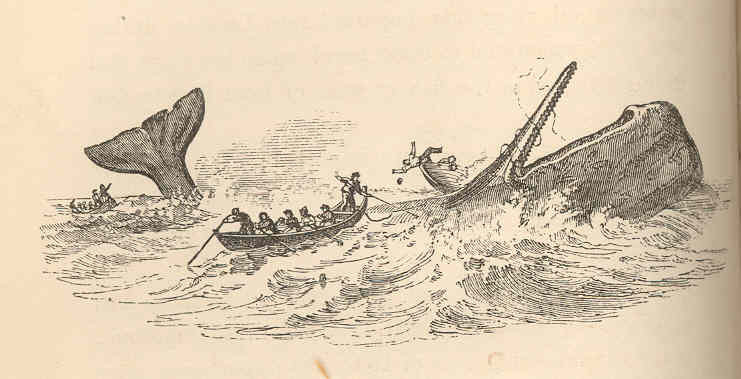
Sperm whale with whalers, 1839 illustration

Bicknell returned to London late in 1809 and soon after he joined a business run by his uncle, John Walter Langton (1746-1822). Langton had established himself as a tallow chandler at Newington Butts, about a mile south of London Bridge, by 1788. Bicknell became a partner in the business about 1809 and the following year he married his cousin, Langton's daughter Hannah. She was the first of his four wives with whom he had a total of thirteen children. The business partnership was also productive and saw the firm become the leading oil merchants and spermaceti refiners in London by 1835. Bicknell was also part-owner of a number of South Sea whaling ships.

There were setbacks along the way. In 1820 a major fire broke out in the boiling works and destroyed much of the building, causing £2,000 in damage. A severe thunderstorm in 1846 produced large hailstones that smashed the windows in the buildings in the compound. It was reported in the press, "the extensive premises of Langton and Bicknell have scarcely a pane left." The business was located opposite St Mary's Church near Elephant and Castle. A friend and close business associate there at Newington Butts was fellow oil merchant and shipowner, Thomas Sturge.

About 1835 Bicknell anticipated agitation for the repeal of the navigation laws would injure his business interests, yet he magnanimously supported the movement, together with the abolition of all protection; and when the crippling of his undertakings and his income came, he accepted it.

Langton & Bicknell, as a business, continued to operate till 1907, long after the death of the original partners.

== Collector ==
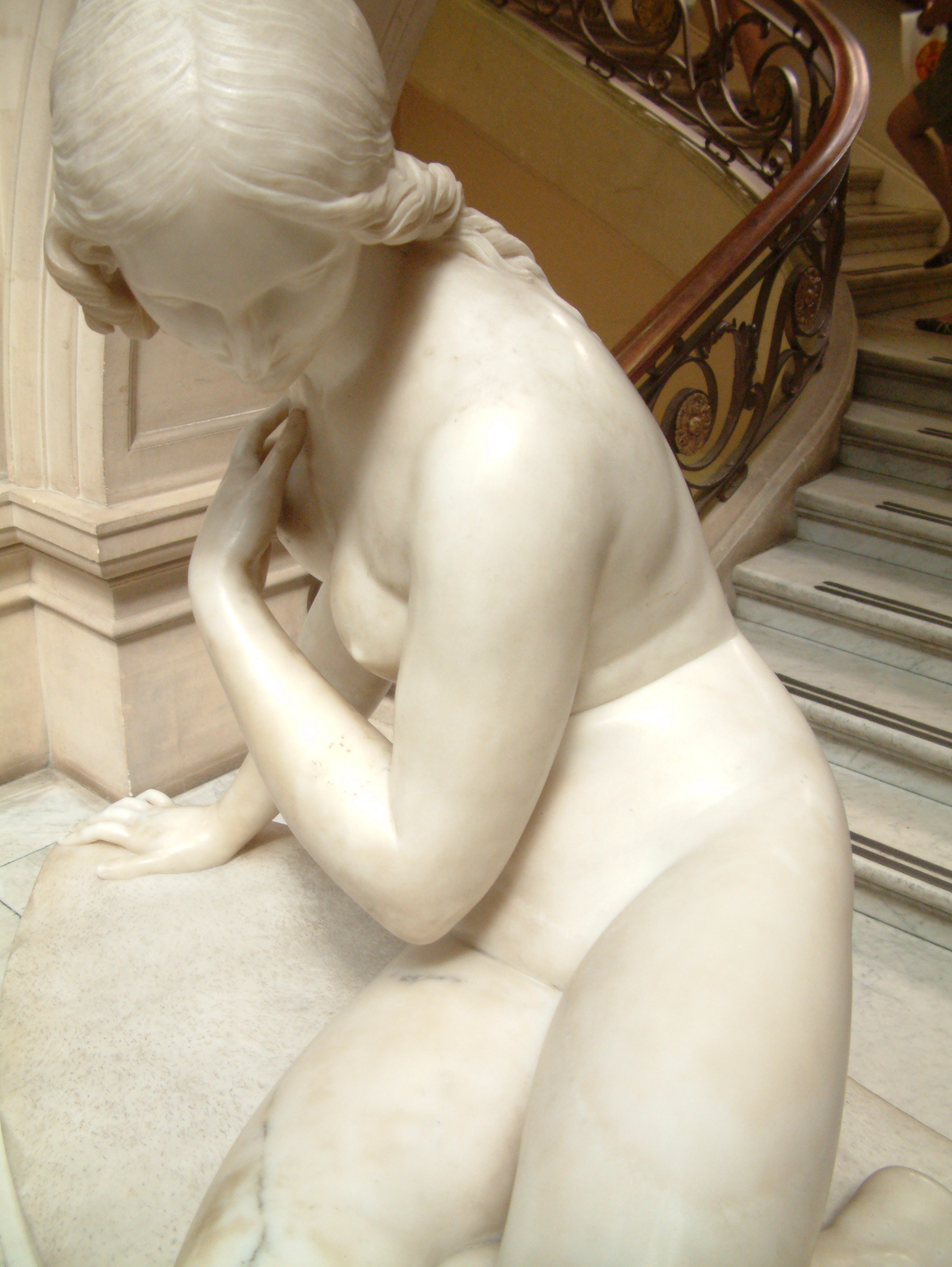
Eve at the Fountain by Edward Hodges Baily, was displayed with Elhanan Bicknell's collection

Bicknell occupied a large house at Herne Hill, Surrey, from 1819. In 1828 he began what became a major collection of pictures by contemporary or recent British artists. By 1850, he had collected some of the works of Thomas Gainsborough, J. M. W. Turner and numerous others including David Roberts, Edwin Landseer (such as Doubtful Crumbs), George Clarkson Stanfield, Thomas Webster, William Collins, William Etty and Augustus Wall Callcott. He became personally acquainted with most of the artists, entertained them in his home and paid them well. The house did not have a Long gallery, so Bicknell placed these works, with pieces of sculpture such as Edward Hodges Baily's Eve at the Fountain, throughout the rooms, and opened his house to art connoisseurs. Gustav Friedrich Waagen published a description and listing by room in his Treasures of Art in Great Britain. A visitor who came to see the collection in 1857 said, "It could not have been formed in better taste." This may have been John Ruskin who lived nearby and made regular visits to see the paintings of, "my always kind neighbour."

Published comments by Ruskin and other art experts made Bicknell's collection well known and may have contributed the high prices it fetched when broken up after his death. A contemporary writing about the high prices paid for fine art in the 1860s said, "the fancy prices quoted are nearly all for pictures from famous collections; and some for the Bicknell pictures, for example, would almost suggest that as much was due to the name of the collector as the merit of the picture."

Bicknell bought many of Turner's finest works before Ruskin's advocacy brought the artist to public prominence. In 1841 he paid Turner £250 for a painting of gondolas in Venice. That painting, Guidecca, La Donna Della Salute and San Giorgio (1840), changed hands in 2006 for US$35.8 million, setting a new record for a British work of art sold at auction.

== Unitarianism ==
In politics and in theology Bicknell was an advanced liberal. He supported Unitarianism, was a principal contributor to the building of the Unitarian chapel at Brixton, and gave to the British and Foreign Unitarian Association. (The chapel on Effra Road was destroyed in the Blitz in 1941.) He was a member of the committee for the erection of, and a substantial donor to, the 1820s campaign for South Place Unitarian Chapel under William Johnson Fox, which evolved into today's Conway Hall Ethical Society.

He was a member of the Worshipful Company of Vintners, one of the oldest Livery Companies in London, serving at various times as Warden and Master.

== Later life ==
One of his minor business ventures was a partnership with London print dealer Joseph Hogarth. The association began in the 1830s and continued into the early 1850s. During that time Hogarth transitioned from a print retailer to a publisher of high-quality art prints.

His business acumen and reputation saw Bicknell being invited to become a partner in the major engineering firm Maudslay; but he turned down the offer. In 1859 his health began to fail, and he retired from business. He passed the rest of his time at Herne Hill, where he died 27 November 1861, aged 72. He was buried at West Norwood Cemetery.

== Legacy ==
Bicknell's will was proved under £350,000. Among the executors were two of his sons, Henry Sandford and Percy.

While Bicknell had wanted to leave his collection to the nation, the family decided otherwise. His pictures, which numbered 122 at his death, were sold at Christie's auction rooms, realising a sum of nearly £80,000. Richard Seymour-Conway, 4th Marquess of Hertford bought about one-third for his own gallery.

== Family ==
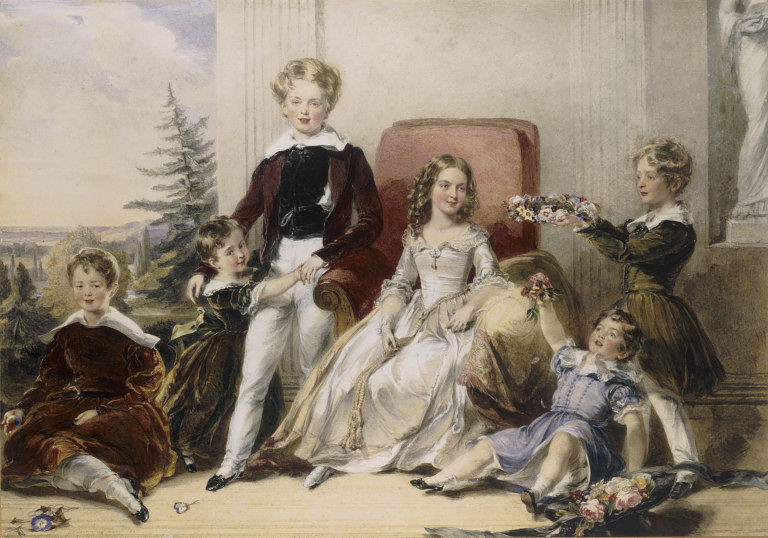
The six children of Elhanan Bicknell Esq, 1842 group portrait by Stephen Poyntz Denning

In 1829 Bicknell married Lucinda Browne, a sister of Hablot Knight Browne (aka Phiz, the illustrator of Charles Dickens). He left a large family by his various marriages, and some of his sons (one of whom married the only child of David Roberts, R.A.), in succeeding to his fortune, made names for themselves in the arts, archaeology, botany, travel, and reform.

- Elhanan Bicknell, the eldest son, died in 1860 at age 46.
- Herman Bicknell (1830–1875), orientalist, was the third son.
- Algernon Sidney Bicknell (1832-1911) soldier, traveller and writer.
- Clarence Bicknell (1842-1918), vicar, botanist, archaeologist and author.
- Henry Sanford Bicknell (1818-1880)
- Mrs Ada Berry (née Bicknell) (1831-1911)
- Edgar Bicknell (1834-1886)
- Percy Bicknell (1836-1911)
- Matilda Bicknell (1838-1858)
- Lucinda Constance Bicknell (1840-1902)
