= Flora of Western Australia =

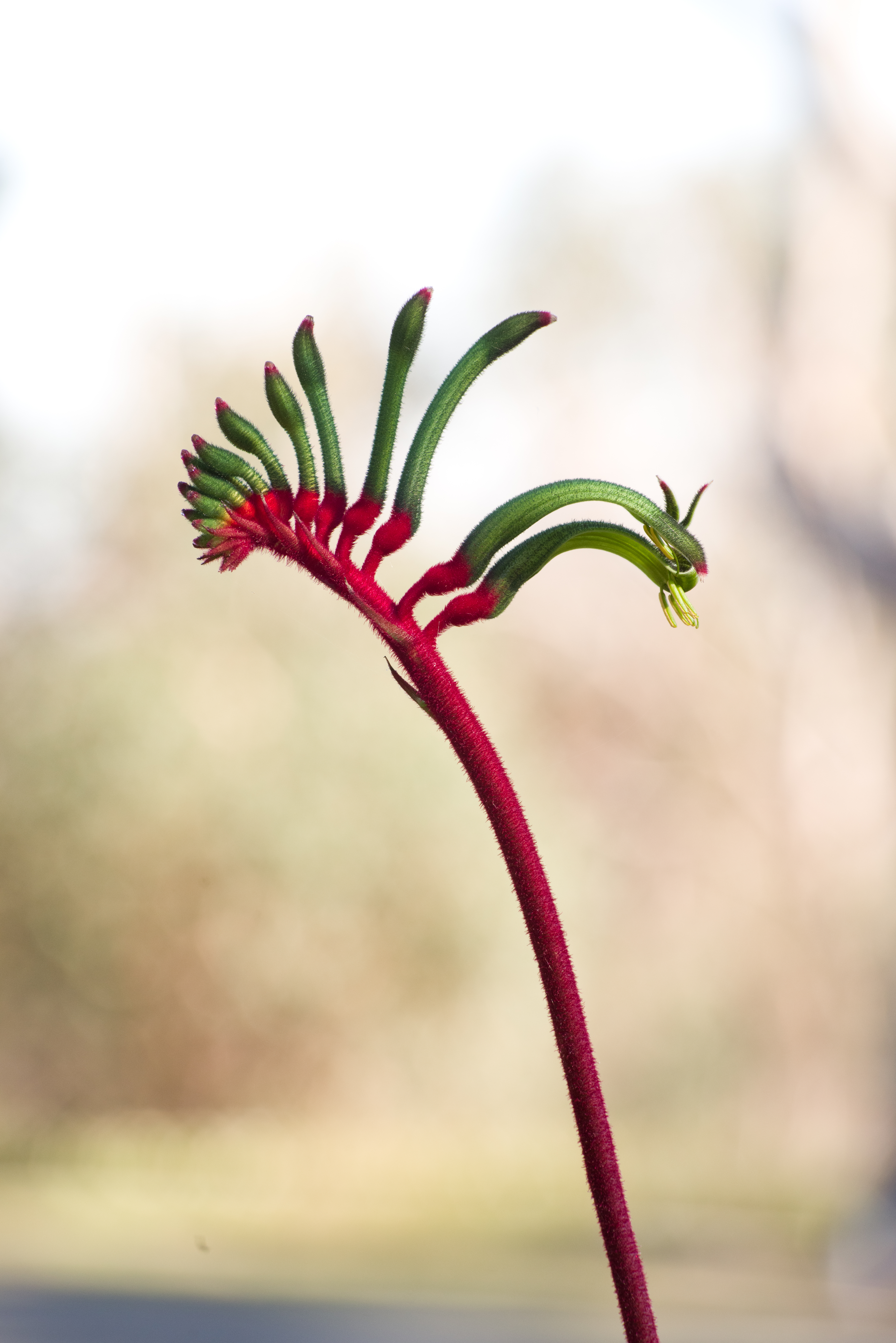
Anigozanthos manglesii Western Australia's floral emblem

The flora of Western Australia comprises 10,842 published native vascular plant species and a further 1,030 unpublished species. They occur within 1,543 genera from 211 families; there are also 1,335 naturalised alien or invasive plant species more commonly known as weeds. There are an estimated 150,000 cryptogam species or nonvascular plants which include lichens, and fungi although only 1,786 species have been published, with 948 algae and 672 lichen the majority.

== History ==
Indigenous Australians have a long history with the flora of Western Australia. They have, for over 50,000 years, obtained detailed information on most plants. The information includes its uses as a source for food, shelter, tools and medicine. As Indigenous Australians passed the knowledge along orally or by example, most of this information has been lost, along many of the names they gave the flora. It was not until Europeans started to explore Western Australia that systematic written details of the flora commenced.

=== 1690s to 1829 ===
The first scientific collection of flora from Western Australia was by William Dampier near Shark Bay and in the Dampier Archipelago in 1699. This collection is housed in the Fielding-Druce Herbarium; of the 24 species collected, 15 were published by John Ray and Leonard Plukenet. There were two species of Western Australian flora published in 1768 by Burman that are thought to have been collected by Willem de Vlamingh during his exploration of the area around the Swan River in 1697.

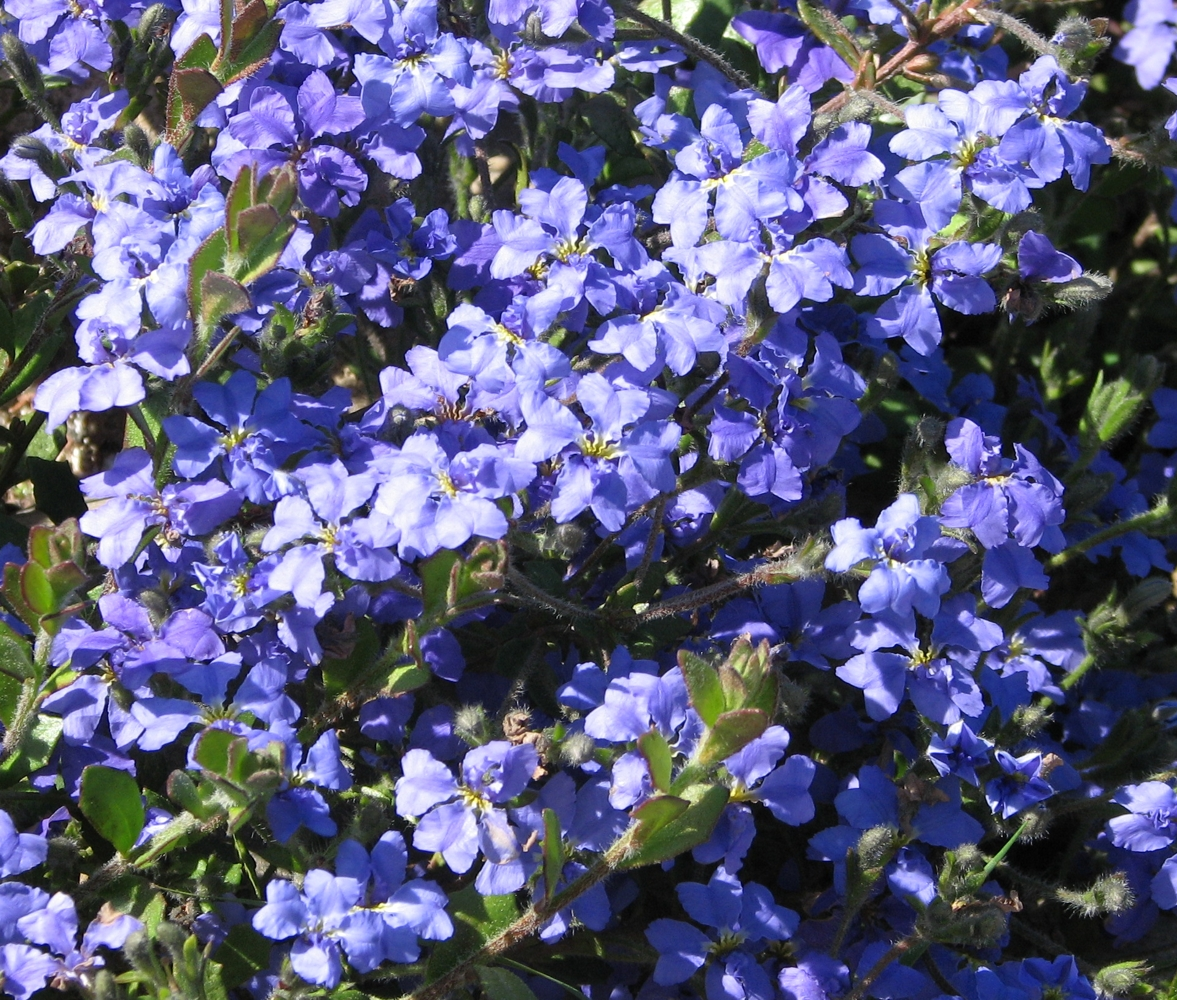
D. linearis of genus Dampiera, named after William Dampier by Robert Brown and published in Prodromus Florae Novae Hollandiae in 1810

In September 1791, Archibald Menzies collected specimens around the King George Sound area while on the Vancouver Expedition. French botanist Jacques Labillardiere in December 1792, as part of the d'Entrecasteaux expedition, collected specimens in the Esperance area before the expedition went on to explore parts of Tasmania. Between 1801 and 1803 Jean Baptiste Leschenault de la Tour was the botanist on Baudins exploration of the Western Australian coast. Labillardiere used the specimens collected to publish the two volume Novae Hollandiae Plantarum Specimen in 1804 and 1807. Of the species originally named by Labillardiere, 105 were still in use in 2000.

While Baudin was exploring the coast with Jean Leschenault de la Tour taking specimens, botanist Robert Brown was with Matthew Flinders in the Investigator circumnavigating Australia. During this voyage Brown collected over 600 specimens from Western Australia between December 1801 and January 1802 and from a short stopover in 1803 before returning to England. On returning to England using the specimens he collected and those of other collectors, Brown published Prodromus Florae Novae Hollandiae in 1810. Along with further publications in 1814 and 1849, Brown created many of the now readily recognisable names of Western Australian flora like Leschenaultia, which was named after Jean Baptiste Leschenault de la Tour, Caladenia, and Dryandra. As of January 2000, over 800 of the species published by Brown are still current.

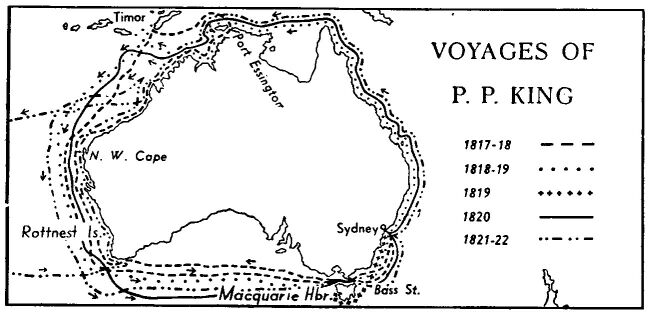
Map of the voyages of King

With increasing interest in the western third of Australia, more botanists were able to collect specimens while on various voyages. Allan Cunningham was aboard the Mermaid in King's surveys between 1817 and 1822 of the Western Australian coast; Cunningham's collections included significant specimens from the northern areas of Western Australia. The establishment of an outpost at King George Sound in 1827 and the founding of the Swan River Colony in 1829 opened Western Australia up to exploration by botanists.

=== 1829 to 1900 ===
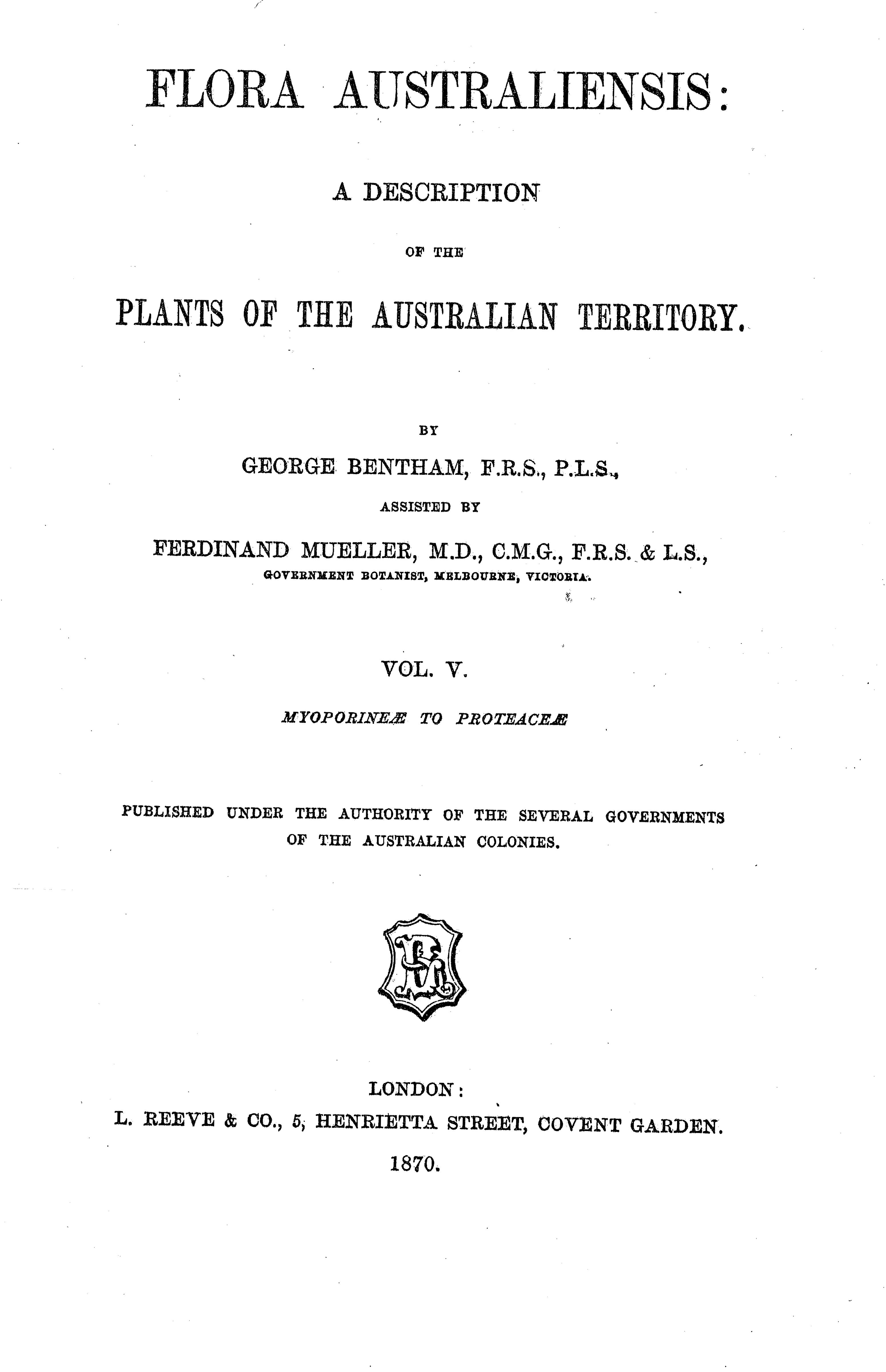
title page from volume five of Flora Australiensis

After settlement in 1829, Western Australia, particularly the south west was more accessible to botanists. During the 1830s–1840s, this included Stephen Endlicher, John Lindley, Johann Lehmann and Ludwig Preiss. The botanists depended on local settlers James Drummond, George Maxwell and many more both during their stay and afterwards for further specimens and observations. From December 1838 through to January 1842, Preiss collected approximately 200,000 plant specimens, including specimens purchased from settlers like Drummond. Naturalist John Gilbert, employed by John Gould to collect specimens in Western Australia, was dismayed at the prices he was paying.

In 1863, George Bentham published the first volume of a seven volume series called Flora Australiensis which included descriptions for 8,125 taxa. This was the first detailed account of Australian flora which included many Western Australian species as the work covered the relationship between many of the larger plant families which occurred across the continent. As Bentham had never been to Australia, he based all his work on the material already collected, assisted by Ferdinand von Mueller Victoria's colonial botanist. Mueller made two visits to WA in 1867 and 1871 to collect material, and 1,122 of the Western Australian species described by Mueller are still in use. In 1882, and revised in 1889, Mueller produced a census of WA flora listing 3,560 individual species.

=== 1901 to 1928 ===
During 1900–01 Ludwig Diels and Ernst Pritzel collected around 5700 specimens, publishing an account of the specimens in 1904-05 that included 200 new species. In 1906 Diels published the first ecological regions for Western Australia flora, dividing the state into three biological provinces. J. J. East in 1912, as part of the Cyclopedia of Western Australia, wrote an essay that noted 4,166 plant species had been identified and included the three biological provinces described by Diels.

After Federation in 1901 many new government departments began small herbaria, run by botanists like Alexander Morrison, Frederick Stoward and Desmond Herbert. These departments contributed to local history journals along with other collectors, such as William Fitzgerald, who in 1918 published an extensive work on the botany of the Kimberleys. In 1928 the amalgamation of the Forestry and the Agricultural departments' herbaria formed the state herbarium.

== Western Australian Herbarium ==
The Western Australian Herbarium is the state herbarium. Part of the State government's Department of Environment and Conservation, it is responsible for the description and documentation of the flora of Western Australia.

In 1970 the Herbarium began publication of the journal Nuytsia. The name came from the genus of a parasitic trees more commonly known as Christmas Trees, Nuytsia floribunda. The journal gives preference to original publications on Western Australian flora including systematic analyses, taxa revisions and highlighting potential invasive species. Approximately 20% of all published Western Australia flora have been formally described in the journal since its inception. Kevin Thiele is a former editor of Nutysia and past curator of the Herbarium.

=== FloraBase ===
FloraBase is a public access web-based database of the flora of Western Australia. It provides authoritative scientific information on taxa, including descriptions, maps, images, conservation status and nomenclatural details. In addition to native species, FloraBase provides information on alien taxa that have naturalised in Western Australia.

== Biodiversity ==
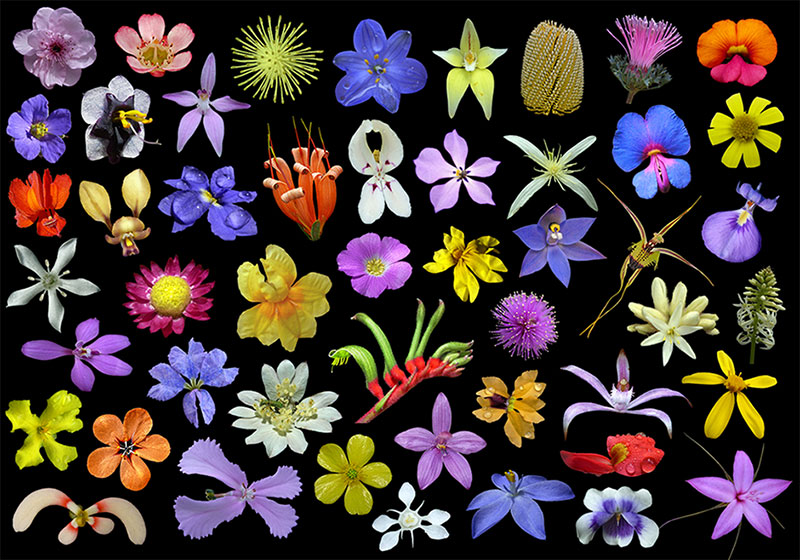
some native wildflowers

Western Australia has 10,551 native vascular plant species from 1,543 genera within 211 families, which is half of the identified plant species in Australia. There are an estimated 150,000 Cryptogam species or non vascular plants which include Lichens, and Fungi although only 1,786 species have been published, with 948 Algae and 672 lichen the majority.

=== Southwest Australia ===
Southwest Australia is a biodiversity hotspot that includes the Mediterranean forests, woodlands, and scrub ecoregions of Western Australia. The region has a wet-winter, dry-summer Mediterranean climate, covers 356,717 km^{2} and consists of a coastal plain 20-120 kilometers wide, transitioning to gently undulating uplands made up of weathered granite, gneiss and laterite. Desert and xeric shrublands lie to the north and east across the center of Australia, separating Southwest Australia from the other Mediterranean and humid-climate regions of the continent.

== See also ==
- Flora of Australia
- Wildlife Conservation Act 1950
- Declared Rare and Priority Flora List
