= Gianfranco Franchini =

Italian architect

- Born: 17 December 1938; Genoa, Italy
- Died: 21 April 2009 (aged 70); Genoa, Italy
- Occupation: Architect
- Buildings: Centre Georges Pompidou, International Civic Library

Gianfranco Franchini (17 December 1938 – 21 April 2009) was an Italian architect.

== Biography ==
Born in Genoa and educated at the Polytechnic University of Milan, Franchini is best known for his collaboration with Renzo Piano and Richard Rogers in designing the Centre Georges Pompidou in Paris, France. While his colleagues continued on to major international architectural commissions, however, Franchini returned to Italy, where he designed smaller scale projects, including a library in Chieri, the International Civic Library in Bordighera, and the restoration of the Mackenzie Castle.

He died in Genoa.
