= Edward Elhanan Berry =

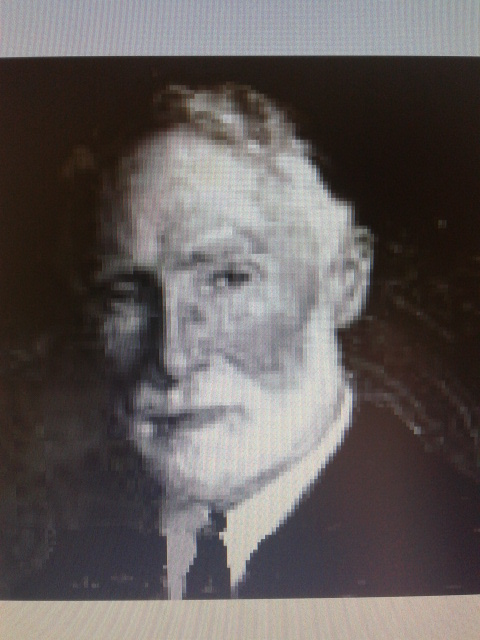
- Edward Elhanan Berry
- Born: May 10, 1861; Kingston, Canada
- Died: 29 January 1931; Rome, Italy
- Occupation: diplomat

Edward Elhanan Berry (1861-1931) was the son of Edward Berry (1817-1875), lawyer and owner, and of Ada Bicknell (1831-1911) sister of Clarence Bicknell.

== Biography ==
Edward was born on May 10, 1861, in Kingston, Canada. Little is known about his childhood, we know only that he returned to London still as a child. He graduated around 1880, it is unknown exactly in which faculty he enrolled, probably a scientific one, because he was later a member of the "Royal Society of Chemistry."

In 1891, aged 30, he decided to move to Bordighera where his maternal uncle Clarence Bicknell lived and he founded the "Bank Berry", located on the corner of the current Corso Italia and via Vittorio Emanuele. The bank prospered, but Berry decided to become an agent for the travel agency "Thomas Cook's." In 1892 Edward created a service agency for the British residents, which took care of buying and selling homes, lease, freight or luggage, etc.

In 1897, Berry became vice-British Consul in Bordighera and the following year he married Margaret Serocold (1867-1957). Probably the two knew each other for a long time since Margaret had come for the first time in Bordighera already in 1886. The couple had no children and created a very profound relationship with Clarence Bicknell, much admired and appreciated by both.

The Berry collaborated and helped Bicknell in all its initiatives such as the creation of Bicknell Museum, the botanical and archaeological research on Mount Bego, the construction of the Fontanalba house etc. On the death of his uncle in 1918, the Berry spouses saved the museum from neglect. Their home, Villa Monte Verde, built in 1904, became the cultural core of Bordighera, as was Villa Rosa in the days of Bicknell. The Villa Monte Verde still exists and is located in Via Mostaccini, but unfortunately has been converted into an apartment building.

Edward shared with his wife and his uncle a passion for history, traditions, art and architecture. In 1931, shortly after the death of Edward, Margaret published the book that she had prepared patiently with her husband, "At the western gate of Italy" which became a reference for all those who visited the west coast. Edward died suddenly in Rome, where he was buried in the Protestant cemetery in the city, and Margaret continued to live until 1935 in Bordighera. The advancing years and the arrival of fascism led to the sale of Villa Monte Verde and her move to Taplow, in the county of Buckinghamshire where lived her sister Caroline Packe. There she lived for another twenty-two years and died in 1957 aged 90.

== Photo gallery ==
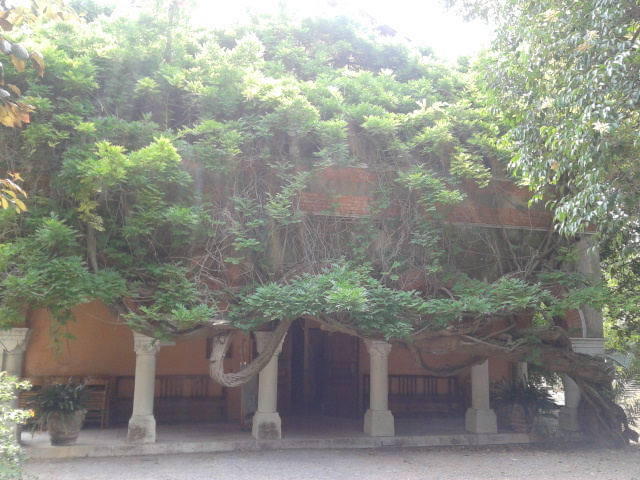
Bicknell Museum, facade

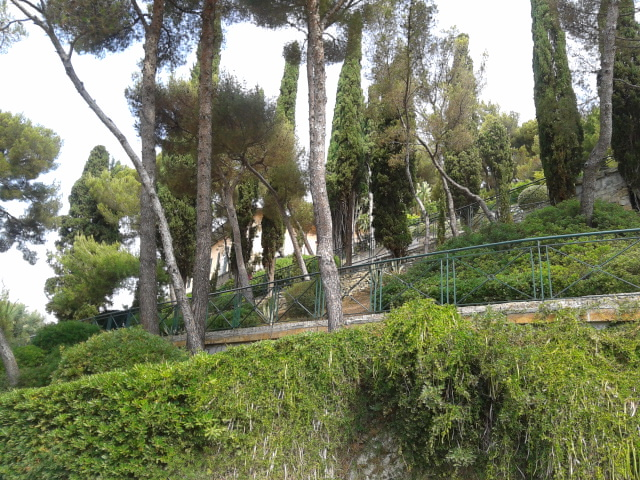
Park Villa Monte Verde, the private residence of Edward and Margaret Berry

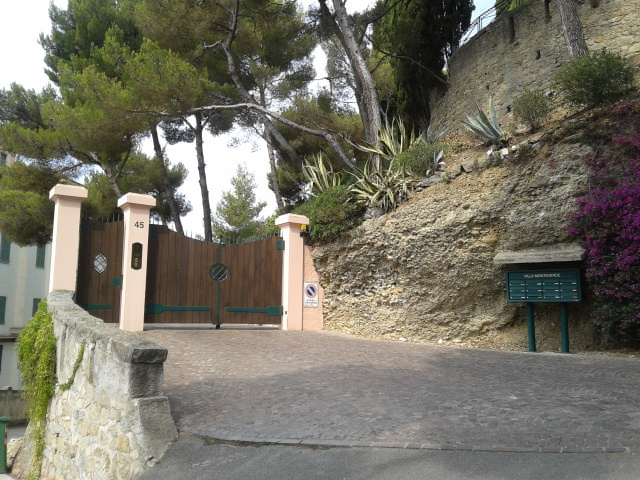
Villa Monteverde entry
