= Anglican Church, Bordighera =

Coordinates: 43.7809°N 7.6628°E

Anglican Church
- Ex-chiesa anglicana
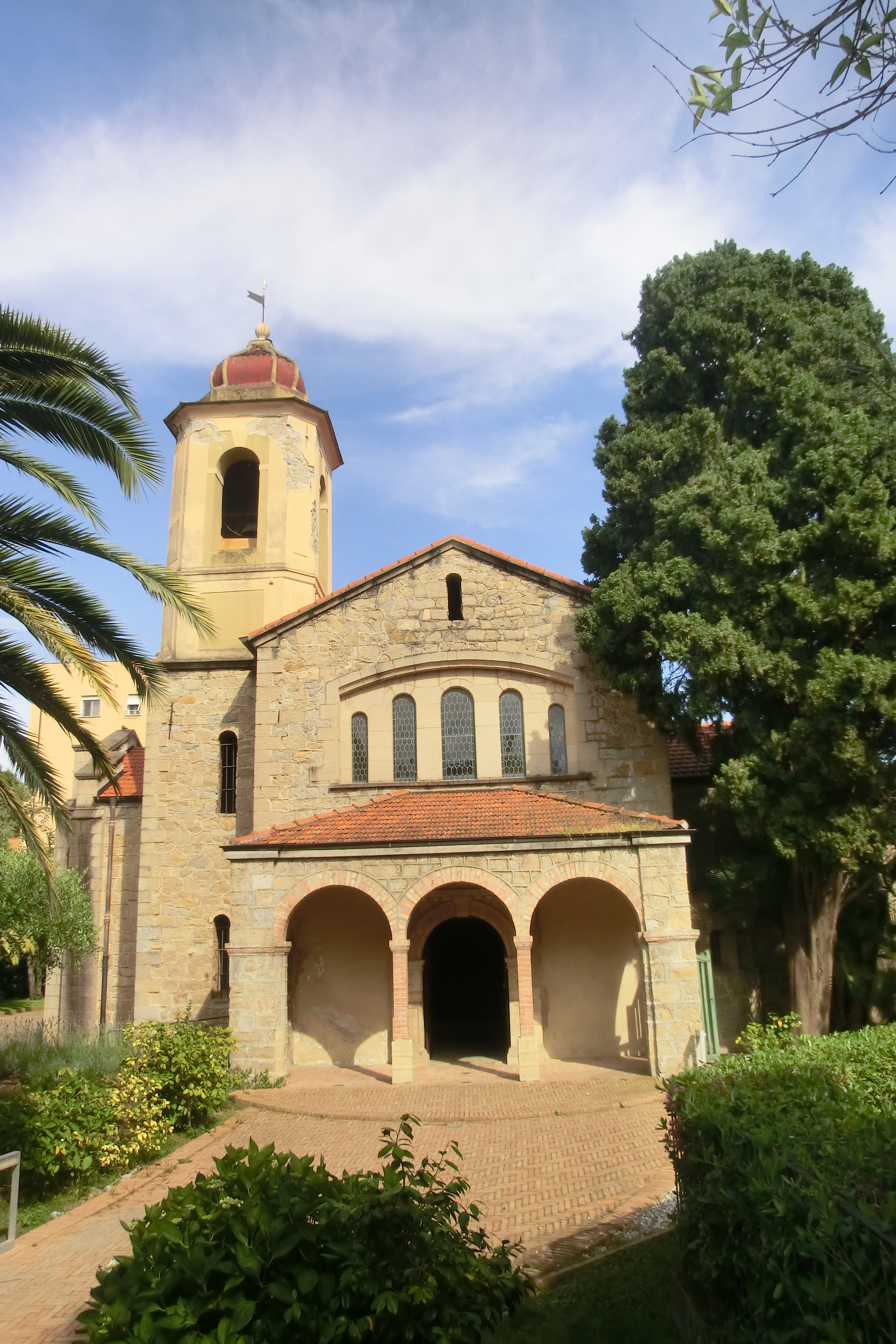
- Anglican Church
- Location: Bordighera
- Country: Italy

History
- Former name: All Saint Church
- Consecrated: 1873

Architecture
- Functional status: Multi-cultural centre
- Years built: 1873

Administration
- Province: Province of Imperia

The Anglican Church was a religious building of the Church of England in via Regina Vittoria in Bordighera on the Riviera, Province of Imperia. Purchased by the City of Bordighera, and then restored, the former church is now a multi-cultural centre and venue for exhibitions, concerts, lectures and performances. The church, its gardens and Villa Rosa are part of the properties protected by the Superintendent of Ministry of Cultural Heritage and Activities and Tourism (Italy).

== History and description ==
The foundation of the church dates back to 1863 thanks to the first British guests who resided here from October to May, some settling permanently. The first faithful gathered in prayer at the '"Hotel d'Angleterre", today known as Villa Eugenia, located in Via Vittorio Emanuele 218. With the rapid rise of the British population, the bishop of Gibraltar appointed a pastor for the city of Bordighera, Reverend Henry Sidebottom. His chaplain was Clarence Bicknell, who catalogued the petroglyphs and botany of the area, commemorated at the Bicknell Museum.

When the Hotel d'Angleterre also became too small, the community of believers was hosted by Mrs. Walker Fanshawe in her private chapel in the park of Villa Rosa. In 1873, Mrs. Fanshawe donated a portion of its park to build a real church.

There was of course a fundraiser to which Charles Henry Lowe also contributed and the church was called "All Saints Church". Eventually the British population had a true place of worship, which also became a centre for social life, where every Thursday afternoon the pastor received for tea the most active members of the city. The small church was enlarged in 1883 and in 1890, when two aisles, a new sacristy and a room for the organ were added.

Religious services were celebrated until the year 2000. Today the church has become municipal property and, after a restoration, it is used as a multi-cultural centre for exhibitions or concerts.

== Gallery ==
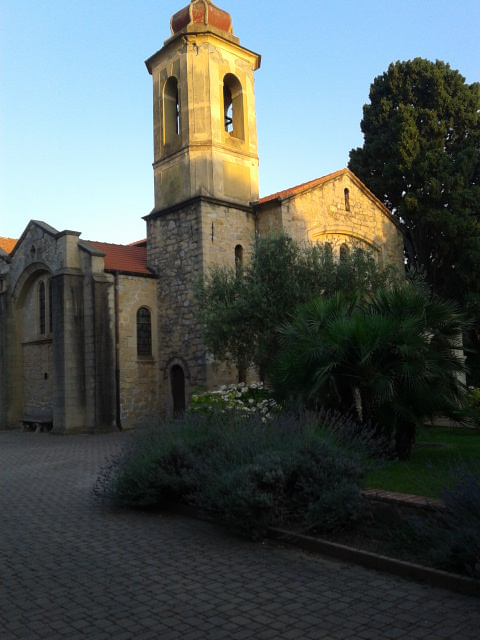
Anglican Church, side view

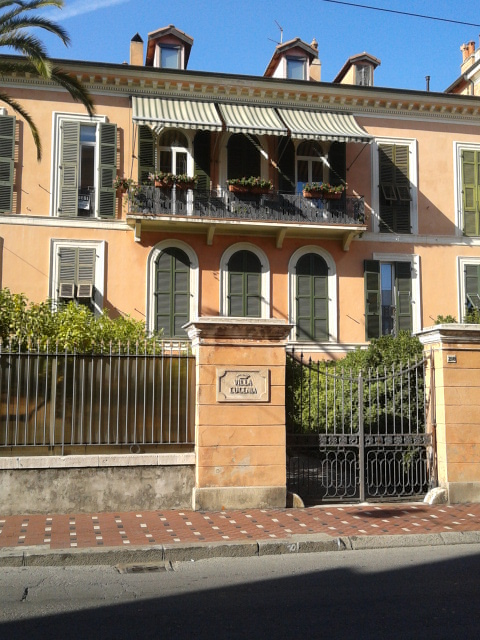
Villa Eugenia, formerly the Hotel d'Angleterre, Bordighera

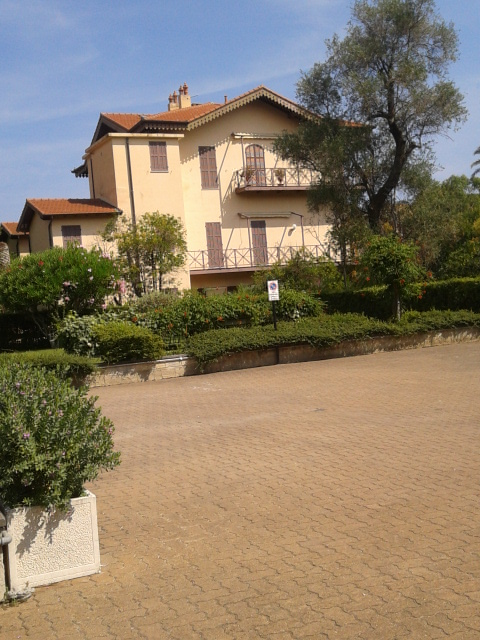
Villa Rosa, Bordighera
