= Clarence Bicknell =

British clergyman, botanist and archaeologist

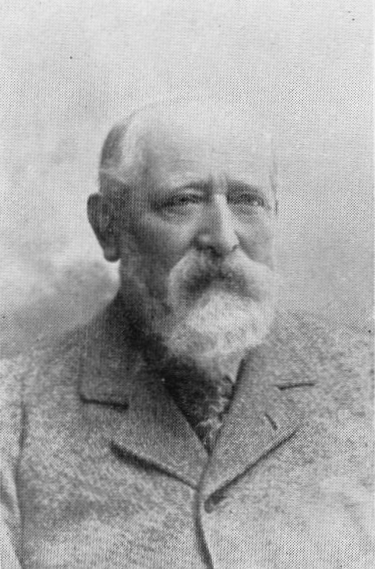
- Bicknell in 1908
- Born: 27 August 1842; London, England
- Died: 17 July 1918 (aged 75); Tende, Italy
- Occupations: Clergyman; botanist; archaeologist; artist; author; Esperantist; philanthropist
- Years active: 1860s–1918
- Notable work: Flowering plants of the Riviera and neighbouring mountains (1885); The prehistoric rock engravings in the Maritime Alps (1902)

Clarence Bicknell (27 August 1842 – 17 July 1918) was a British vicar, amateur archaeologist, botanist, artist, Esperantist, author and philanthropist. He founded the Bicknell Museum in Bordighera, Italy. Also named after him is a street in Bordighera, and two plant species.

== Early life ==
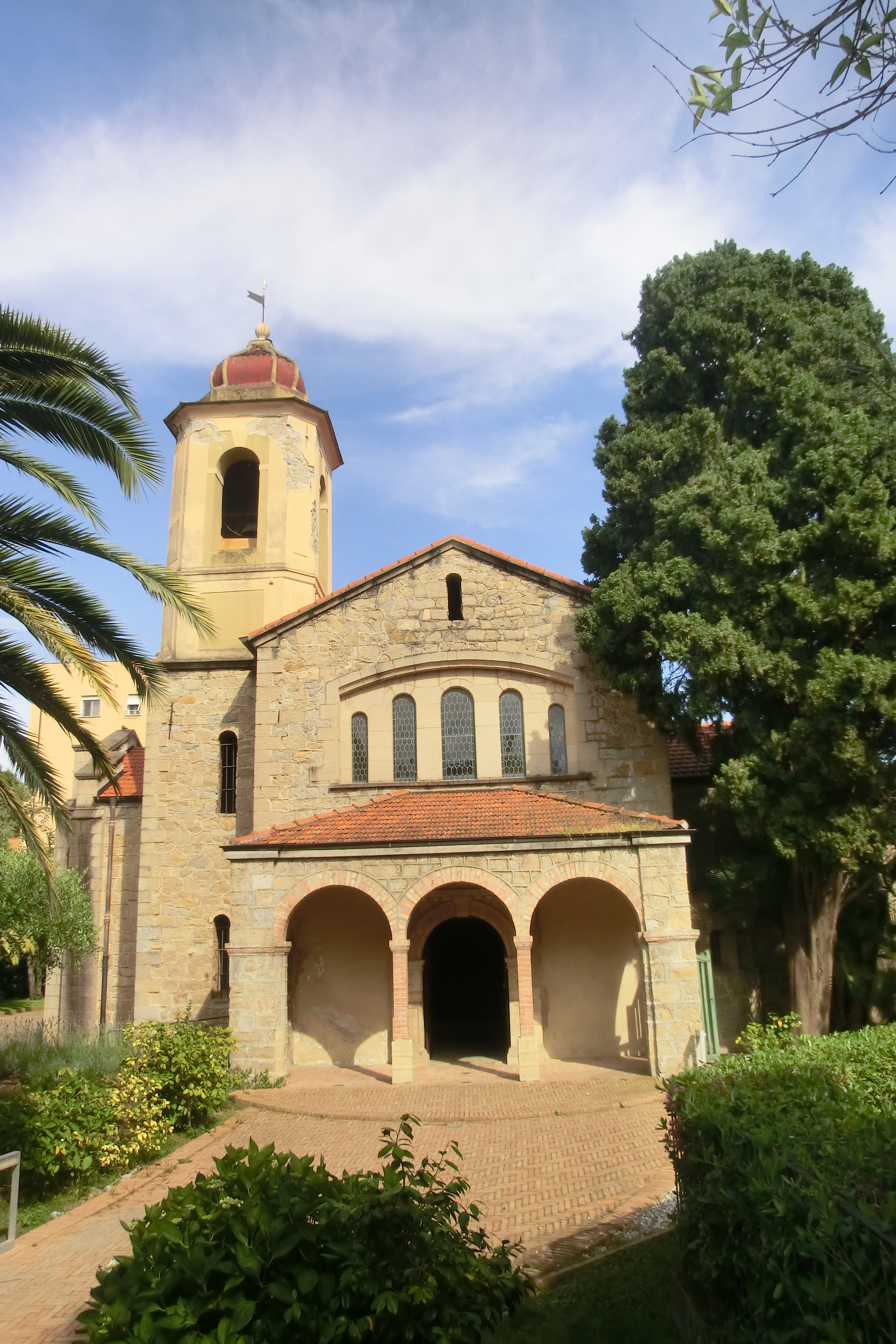
Anglican Church, Bordighera, now used as a municipal cultural centre

Clarence Bicknell was the youngest son of successful British businessman and patron of the arts, Elhanan Bicknell (1788–1861), and his third wife, Lucinda Sarah (1801–1850). Clarence and ten of his siblings survived childhood and grew up in their parents' mansion, surrounded by extensive gardens, at Herne Hill, London. He was just seven years old when his mother died in 1850. His father remarried a year later and soon after young Clarence was sent to Rev J. Edward's boarding school at Dorney, Buckinghamshire.

Elhanan Bicknell was a committed Unitarian and a major donor to the British and Foreign Unitarian Association. His son Clarence broke with his father's faith and in 1861, the year of his father's death, was baptised into the Church of England. That same year he began his studies at Trinity College, Cambridge, receiving a B.A. in mathematics in 1865. He decided on a career in Anglican ministry, entered holy orders and was ordained a deacon in 1866. Two years later, he became a priest.

Clarence Bicknell's first post was as a curate at St Paul's, Walworth, where he remained till November 1873. He then accepted a position at St Peter's Church, Stoke on Tern, a village in Shropshire. In September 1878, he accepted the post of chaplain to a new Anglican church under construction for the British community in Bordighera, Italy, a popular resort for wealthy tourists.

He suffered some kind of crisis of faith, left his post, cut his ties with organised religion entirely, and returned to Britain in June 1879.

== Life in Italy ==
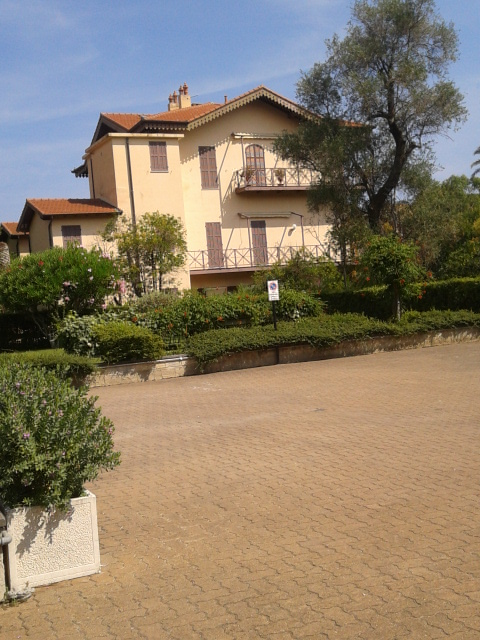
Villa Rosa, Bordighera in 2015

Clarence Bicknell returned to Bordighera later in the year and purchased Villa Rosa, which became his home for the remainder of his life. Among his friends and associates in the expatriate community were horticulturalist Ellen Willmott, author George MacDonald, banker Raphael Bischoffsheim, architect Charles Garnier, businessman Sir Thomas Hanbury and artist Louise Jopling.

The English colony at Bordighera, and Clarence Bicknell in particular, often supported worthy causes. When a major earthquake devastated the region on 23 February 1887, causing around 600 deaths and widespread damage, he joined the Earthquake Help Committee and took a mule loaded with provisions and blankets to mountain villages that lay in ruins. He gave financial support to local students undertaking higher education or specialist training. Among these was a bricklayer turned opera singer, Pietro Zeni (1870-1932). In 1911, he provided funds for the purchase and renovation of a house in Bordighera which became St Joseph's Home for the Aged Poor. He contributed to the support of refugees who came to the town during World War I. During the conflict he volunteered with the Red Cross to roll bandages and collect bags of sphagnum moss to dress wounds.

Bicknell would sometimes escape the dust and heat of the Bordighera summer by travelling back to Britain to visit his siblings, especially his sister, Mrs Ada Berry. He travelled further afield in December 1889 on a voyage to Egypt. The journey included a paddlesteamer excursion up the Nile as far as Aswan, that he chronicled in a diary, illustrated with watercolours. Other Mediterranean travel took him to Palermo (1898), Majorca (1899), Corsica (1901 & 1905), Sardinia (1904) and Malta (1910).

In 1891, his 30-year-old nephew, Edward Elhanan Berry, moved to Bordighera for health reasons. He established a bank, became the local representative for travel agent Thomas Cook and, later, served as the British vice consul. He and his wife, Margaret, assisted Clarence in his work and provided a warm family environment that enriched his life in Italy.

=== Botany ===
During long walks in the surrounding countryside, Bicknell noticed and admired the profusion of local wildflowers. He began to collect examples of each type, which he would later draw and paint, press and classify in a systematic manner. His expeditions took him further into the Maritime Alps, collecting an ever-increasing range of plants. By 1884 he had completed over one thousand watercolour paintings of wildflowers. Some 82 of these were redrawn into lithographic plates to illustrate his first book. In 1886 he started an herbarium of dried plants that within a decade numbered 1,700 examples. Of help to him in this work was his close friendship with Swiss botanist Emile Burnat who shared his interest in the flora of the Maritime Alps. They corresponded for more than thirty years, shared findings and exchanged dried plants and visited each other's homes. This cooperation was noted in the prefaces to their published works. Among other friends and associates in botany were Abbot Antonio Carestia (1825-1908), Reginald Farrer, Oreste Mattirolo, James Walter White, Cedric Bucknall, and Carlo Pietro Stefano Sommier (1848-1922) who recommended Bicknell be admitted to the Societa Botanica Italiana. Specimens he collected were regularly donated to other botanists and institutions and examples can be found in more than 20 herbaria in Europe and the United States.

Bicknell discovered a number of new plant species, several of which bear his name. One is Euphrasia bicknellii, and another, found on an excursion to Majorca, is Pimpinella bicknellii. Helping him in the work was Giacomo Pollini, and his son Luigi, who he employed as his assistants in the botanical and archaeological research that filled the rest of his life.

He later published and described 4 new species of plants;

- Cirsium × morrisii C.Bicknell, Malpighia 8: 392 (1894)
- Hieracium beauverdianum subsp. laricicola C.Bicknell & Zahn, Hieracioth. Eur. [Zahn] 3: 26 (1908)
- Hieracium juranum subsp. fontanalbae C.Bicknell & Zahn, Hieracioth. Eur. [Zahn] 2: 27 (1907)
- Hieracium prasinellum C.Bicknell & Zahn, Icon. Fl. Germ. Helv. (H.G.L. Reichenbach) 19(2,4): 128 (1907)

=== Archaeology ===
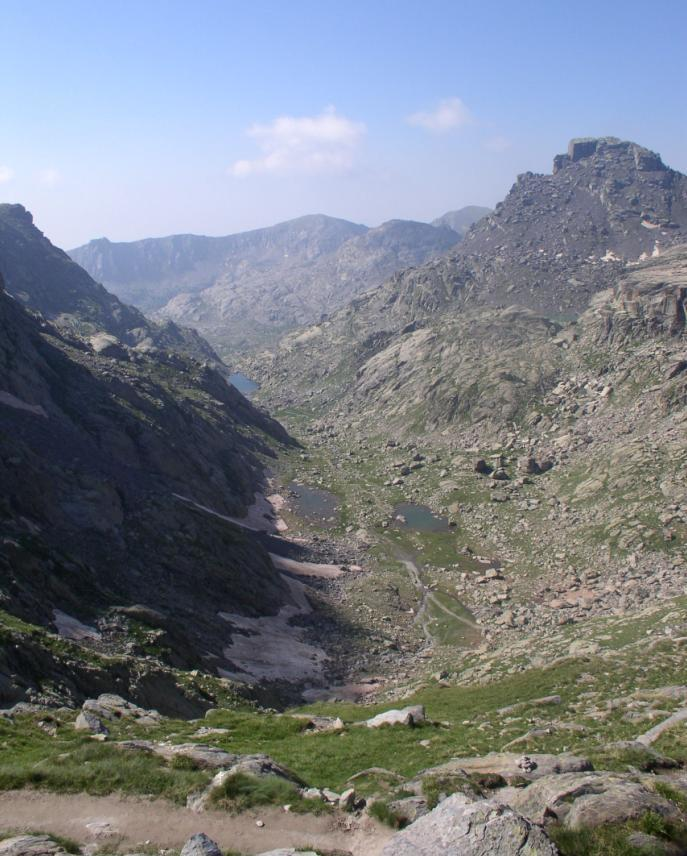
The Vallée des Merveilles (Valley of Marvels)

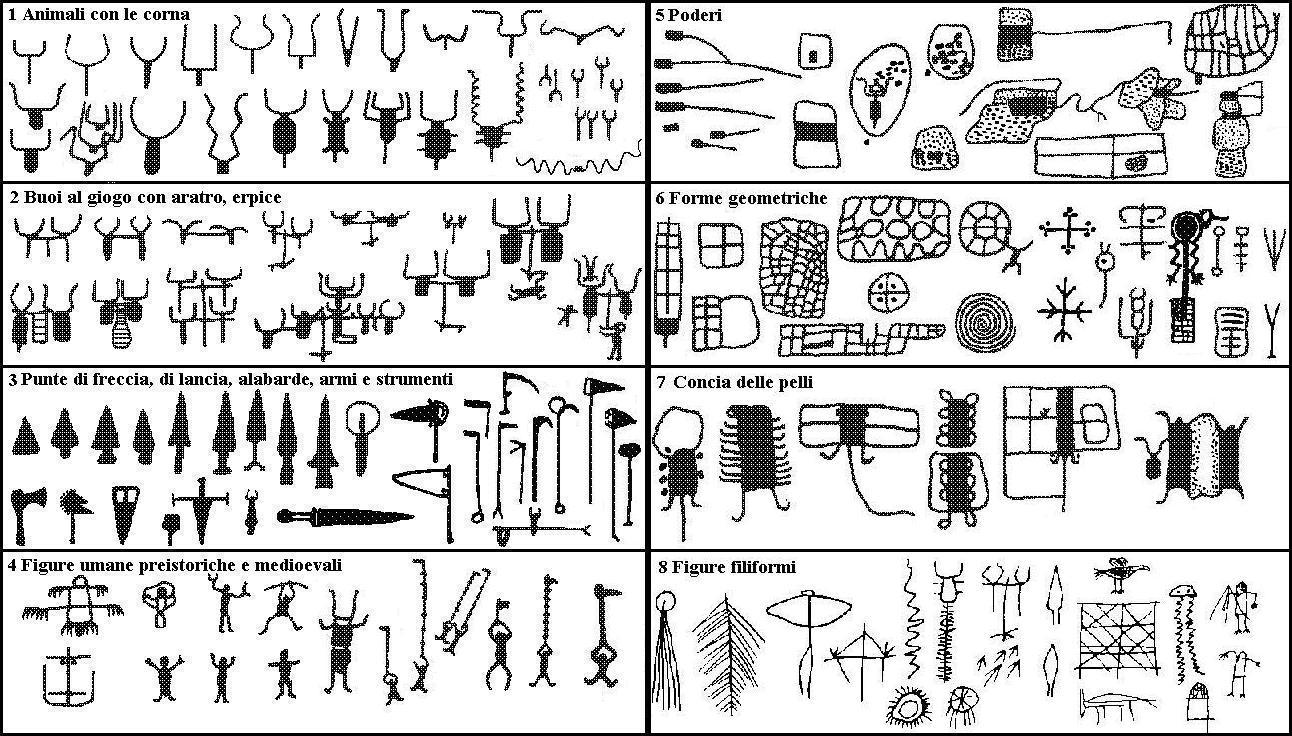
Examples of petroglyphs found in the Vallee des Merveilles

Bicknell first visited the Valle della Meraviglie (Vallee des merveilles) in the Maritime Alps in 1881 in search of rare plants. Located close to the border with France, the "Valley of Marvels" is the site of 35,000 Bronze Age petroglyphs, the recording of which became a major new research project for Bicknell. The rock carvings had been known and written about since at least 1690, but Bicknell was the first person to make a methodical study of them. Starting in 1885, he spent summers in a rented house at nearby Casterino, venturing out to draw, make heelball (wax and lampblack) rubbings and photograph the petroglyphs, eventually creating 12,000 images of the carvings. An even larger number of carvings were located in the nearby Val Fontanalba, many of which he and his helpers also copied. He catalogued these, and speculated about their age and purpose. Most show ploughs, oxen and weapons, but some feature men and geometric patterns. They are thought to date from between 1000 and 1500 BC. He delivered a paper on his findings to the Societa Linguistica in Genoa in 1897, that was later published. One of his associates in this research was palaeontologist Arturo Issel of Genoa who visited Bicknell at the site and used many of his illustrations and findings in his own books. Among others he met or corresponded with to discuss his findings were the French prehistorian Émile Cartailhac and British archaeologist Sir Arthur Evans.

The house he rented at Casterino each summer was sold in 1903. No other suitable house nearby was available for rent so he decided in 1906 to build his own summer house in the valley. This he called Casa Fontanalba and the interior he decorated with his own paintings, carvings and other craft work with botanical and archaeological themes in a style inspired by the Arts and Crafts Movement. The walls he decorated with mottos and other inscriptions written in Esperanto.

=== Esperanto ===
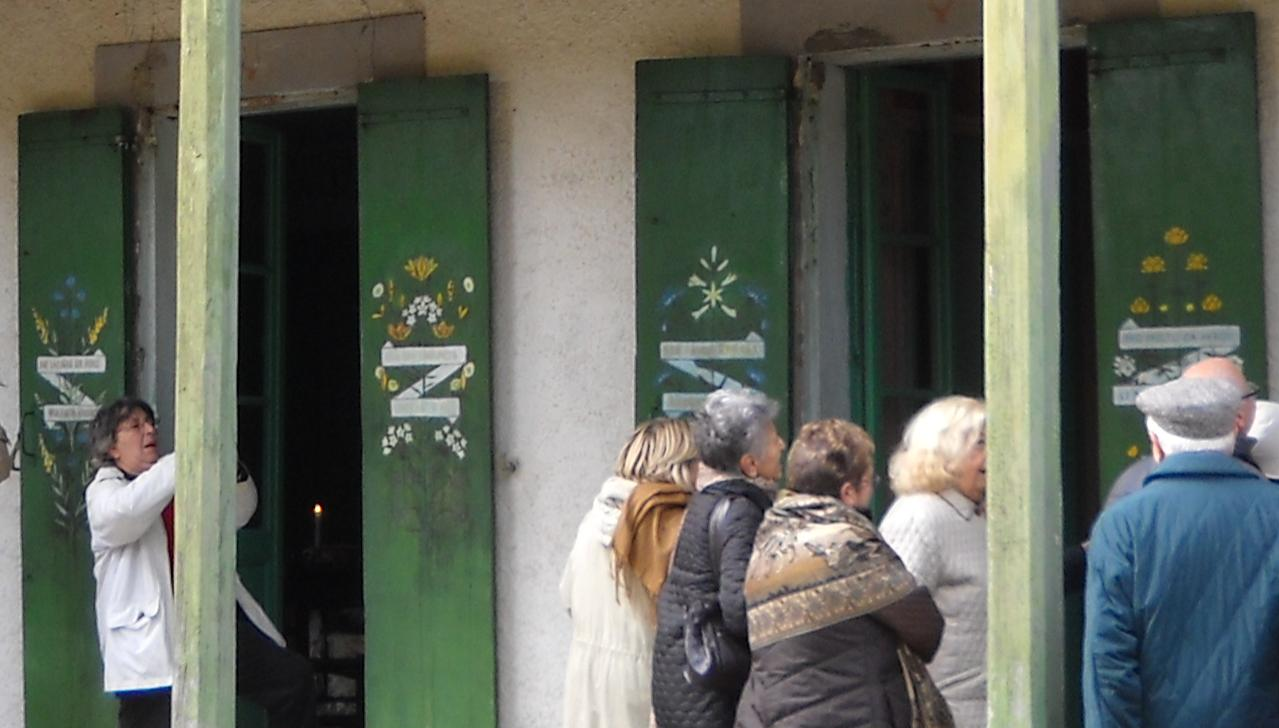
Esperantists visiting Clarence Bicknell's house in Casterino (Tenda), which he built and decorated with painted flowers and sentences in Esperanto

Bicknell was an enthusiast for Esperanto, the universal language published in 1887 by Ludwik Lejzer Zamenhof. He learned to speak it in 1897, wrote and translated poems into Esperanto and taught the language at Milan and Bordighera. He attended the first International Esperanto Congress, held at Boulogne in 1905, at the end of which he was voted a member of the Esperanto Language Committee. He attended later annual congresses at Geneva (1906), Cambridge (1907), Barcelona (1909), Kraków (1912) and Bern (1913).

In Bordighera he welcomed the bohemian Rosa Junck to whom he taught Esperanto and with whom he collaborated in the translation of numerous literary works.

He wrote numerous original poems in Esperanto, which appeared in La Revuo and in The British Esperantist ; many others remained in the manuscript stage. He translated Horatius in 1906 (by Lord Thomas Babington Macaulay); Guinevere (from "Idylls of the King" by Alfred Tennyson) in 1907; Rikoltado de la pecoj (from Harvesting the Pieces by Julian Sturgis) in 1915; Ŝakludo (from A game of chess by Giuseppe Giacosa, 1915) and numerous other works. Particularly appreciated was the poem he wrote on the occasion of the death of Ludwik Lejzer Zamenhof in 1917.

=== Hymnody ===
Bicknell was the first significant contributor of Christian hymns to Esperanto literature. The Hymnary.org database records 6 of his original hymns and 17 of his translations as having been published in various Esperanto hymnals; many of them first appeared in the 1907 Anglican Ordo de Diservo, the first Esperanto hymnal, published for use at the Universala Kongreso in Cambridge that year. He is also credited as the composer of one hymn tune, COME FAITHFUL PEOPLE, published in the 1906 English Hymnal.

=== Art ===
Bicknell and his siblings grew up in a mansion surrounded by his wealthy father's extensive art collection. He probably took art lessons at home or at school. He certainly received instruction in Italy where he took lessons with expatriate Belgian artist Jules Pierre van Biesbroeck. He became an accomplished artist with pen and watercolour, using his skill to sketch or paint his botanical subjects. Later, he created decorative objects with a botanical or archaeological theme. He illustrated his travel diaries, and, engravings of some of his artwork appear in his books.

=== Museo Bicknell ===
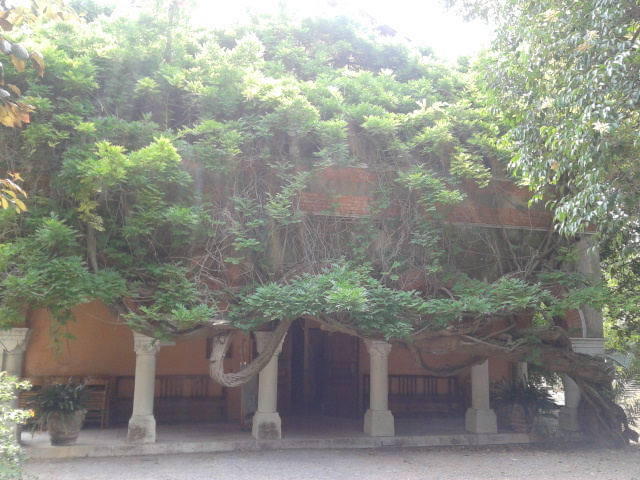
The Clarence Bicknell Museum, Bordighera. The entrance is dominated by a large wisteria.

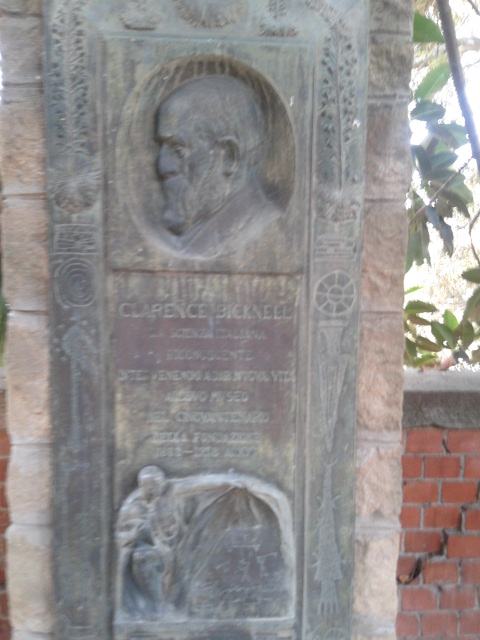
A small monument to Clarence Bicknell located in the garden surrounding Bicknell Museum

In 1886 Bicknell commissioned British architect Clarence Tait to draw up plans for a museum in Bordighera to house his herbarium, paintings, drawings and other artefacts relating to the history, fauna and culture of Western Liguria. Bicknell Museum - the first in the region - still exists and is surrounded by gardens laid out at the time by Ampeligo Bianchier.

The Museum features a hall where concerts, art exhibitions and other cultural events were staged, often to raise funds for local charities. An extension was built in 1910, to house the museum's lending library, and, as of 2018, it contains 60,000 volumes.

== Publications ==
As a result of his studies over many years, Bicknell became a recognised authority on the plants and petroglyphs of the Ligurian Riviera. His published writings include:

- Flowering Plants of the Riviera and Neighboring Mountains (1885),
- Flora of Bordighera and San Remo (1896),
- The Prehistoric Rock engravings in the Maritime Alps (1902),
- Further Explorations in the Regions of the Prehistoric Rock Engravings in the Italian Maritime Alps (1903)
- Guide to the Prehistoric Rock Engravings of the Italian Maritime Alps (1913).

== Death and legacy ==
In 1898, he found Pimpinella bicknellii Briq. an endemic to Majorca and it was later named after by him John Briquet, Director of the Botanical Garden of Geneva. Also a species of Hawkweed was found in the Alps and named after him, Hieracium bicknellianum Belli & Arv.-Touv.

Clarence Bicknell died at Casa Fontanalba on 17 July 1918. He was 75 years of age and was buried at Tende. His nephew, Edward Berry, wound up his estate in Italy and distributed funds to provide ongoing support for Museo Bicknell and other institutions in Bordighera in which Bicknell had been involved.

More than 38,000 of his rubbings of rock carvings, watercolour paintings of flowers or landscapes, letters, diaries, albums, notebooks, sketchbooks, plant samples, photos and personal items have been located in 36 museums and university collections in a dozen countries. Including 100 specimens now within the Fielding-Druce Herbarium, in Oxford. These provide the raw material for continued research into the subjects concerned. His rubbings of petroglyphs are of particular value as vandalism and commercial developments in the valleys has seen many of the carvings damaged, removed or destroyed.

In 1912, he was awarded the "Natural Flower" at the Esperantist Internaciaj Floraj Ludoj.

In 2012, the Clarence Bicknell Association was founded to commemorate his life and work. It has so far produced a web site, published a biography, a short filmed biopic, and helped organize conferences, exhibitions and seminars in Britain and Italy.
