= Bicknell Museum =

- Museo Bicknell
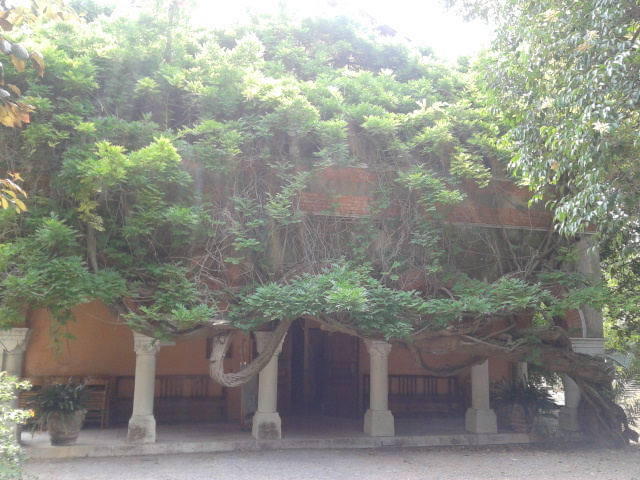
- Bicknell Museum
- Established: 1888
- Location: Bordighera, Italy
- Coordinates: 43°46′55″N 7°40′04″E
- Type: Natural history museum
- Collection size: Plants; fossils
- Website: museobicknell.com

The Clarence Bicknell Museum is a small concealed building at 39 Via Romana in Bordighera. This is often referred to as its official address, but the large villa is the seat of the International Institute of Ligurian Studies. To the right of the building is via Clarence Bicknell, leading to the entrance of the gardens of the villa and of the museum. The two buildings are part of the same block. In 1888, Clarence Bicknell built the museum to collect, preserve, and exhibit his archaeological and botanical collections.

== History ==
Clarence Bicknell was the first to systematically study the images engraved on the rocks of Monte Bego. During his explorations and research, he collected notes, drawings, casts, and photographs that were used by many scholars and enthusiasts. Many of his works were published in the volumes of the Linguistic Society and in French specialized magazines. Bicknell was a passionate botanist; he devoted himself to the study of the local flora and the Maritime Alps in general. His research was published in two books which became a point of reference for scholars in the field: Flowering plants and ferns of the Riviera (1885) and Flora of Bordighera and San Remo or a catalogue of the wild plants growing in western Liguria in the area bounded by the outer watersheds of the Arma and Nervia torrents (1896).

The fruits of his passion can be seen in the Bicknell Museum in Bordighera. Created in 1888, it was the first museum of western Liguria. The rectangular building has an entrance protected by a portico with four Roman-inspired columns, built by the English architect Clarence Trait. The interior is inspired by the structure used in Anglican churches, with the podium required by lecturers for their academic presentations. Both sides have a fine fireplace decorated by Bicknell with floral and animal motifs. On the fireplace on the right, there is a quote by Dante Alighieri: "Don’t do science if you do not think you have understood", and on the left, the crests of those who collaborated in the creation of the museum: Clarence Tait, Giovenale Gastaldi, Francesco Giovannelli, and Bicknell.

The museum also contains Clarence Bicknell’s library, where it is possible to consult some 85,000 volumes, 3,000 journals specialised in art and local history, 14,000 engravings, and his famous personal collection of butterflies, known to still be one of the most prestigious in Europe.

On Bicknell’s death, all the museum's properties were inherited by the son of his sister, Edward Elhanan Berry, with whom he was very close, and by his wife Margaret Serocold Berry, whom he considered as a daughter. Berry came to Bordighera in 1880 at the age of 19 years to open a bank for the British. He immediately formed a special bond with this uncle whom he never knew before, and who passed on to him a passion for botany and history. Berry, who did much with his uncle for the creation of the museum, made many contributions to the collections gathered by Bicknell. In the building adjacent to the museum lies the International Institute of Ligurian Studies, where one can admire the original book published by Berry in 1931, At the western gate of Italy, which was long regarded as an essential text for anyone who wanted to study art and architecture of the Italian Riviera.

When Edward died, Margaret worked to maintain the museum and the cultural activities launched by Bicknell and by her husband. She even made their private residence, Villa Monteverde (via Mostaccini 54), now a private residence, one of the most fashionable lounges in Bordighera. During the Fascist period, the British became 'persona non grata' in Italy, and Margaret passed the precious museum and all of its contents to Nino Lamboglia, with whom she had worked in 1932, to build the future International Institute of Ligurian Studies.

The Bicknell Museum, the International Institute of Ligurian Studies, and the portion of the Roman street (Via Augusta) are part of the property protected by the Superintendence for Architectural Heritage and Landscape of Liguria.

== Garden ==
The museum, as often happens in Bordighera, is nestled in a lush garden with old trees. The main star of this little paradise is a huge "Ficus Magnolioide" located near the entrance. This tree from Oceania has adapted very well to Bordighera’s micro climate, to the point that it has reached the height of 21 meters and a diameter of 8.6 meters. During its growth, it has incorporated a part of the wall and the gate’s original entry. This tree is on the list of monumental trees of Italy, identified by the State Forestry Corps. Not far away, there is also another ficus, smaller, but also of great value. In the garden, you can also admire a small monument in honour of Clarence Bicknell as well as a fragment of the old Roman road.

== Gallery ==
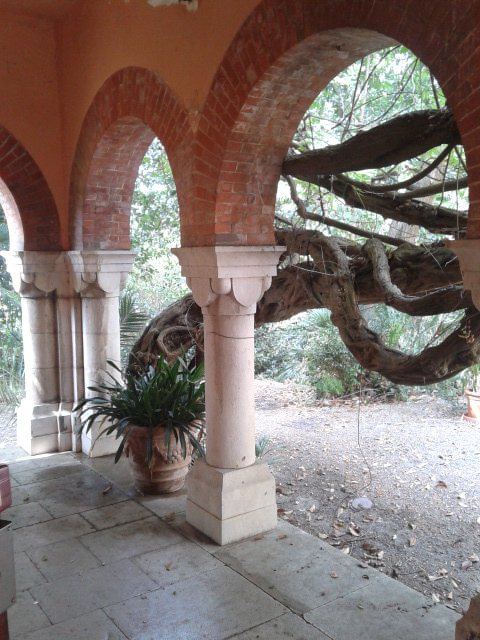
Bicknell Museum, porch and wisteria

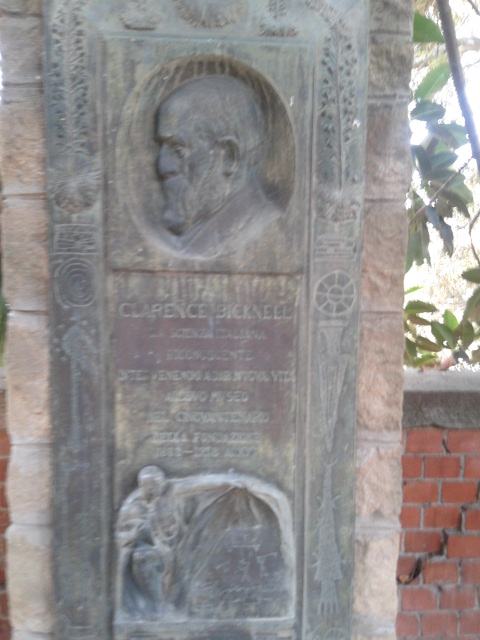
Clarence Bicknell monument

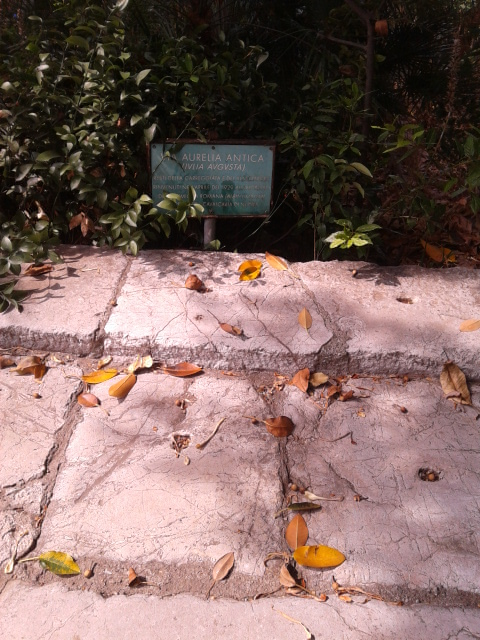
Via Augusta

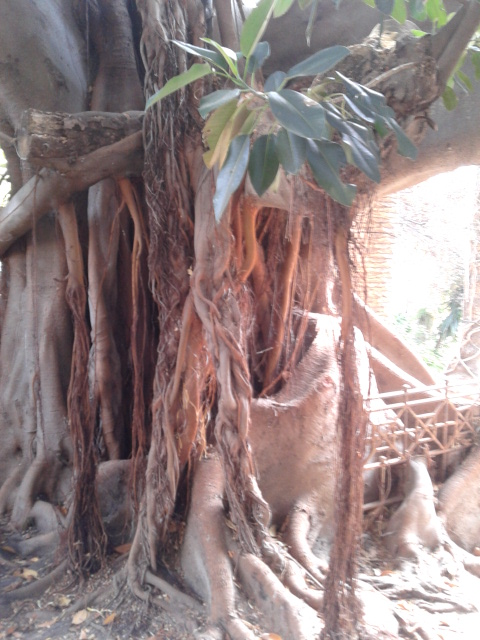
Ficus swallowing the gate

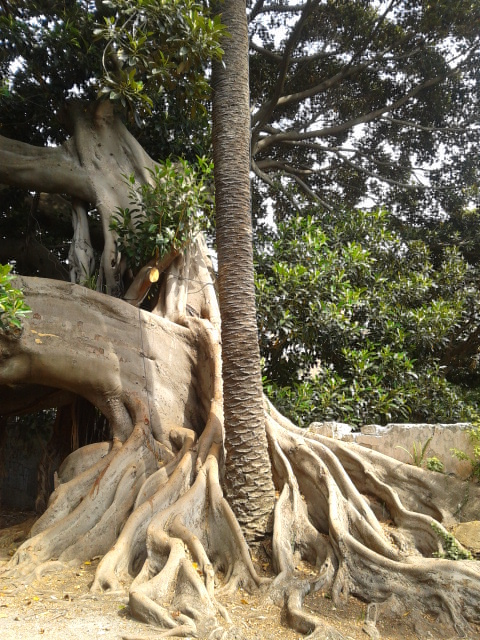
Ficus absorbing a palm tree

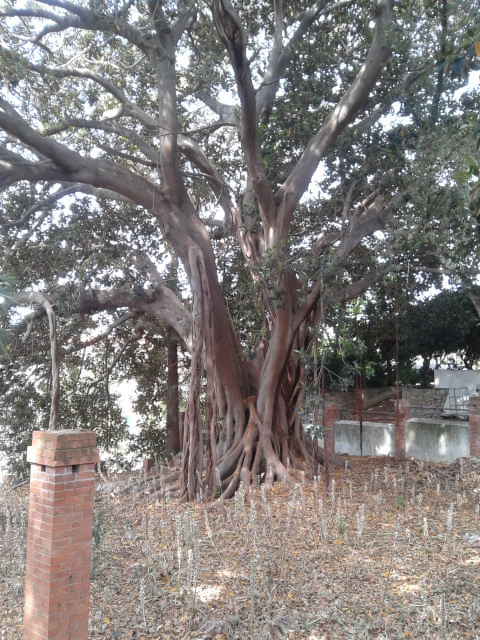
Second smaller ficus
