= Carmo di Brocchi =

Mountain in Italy

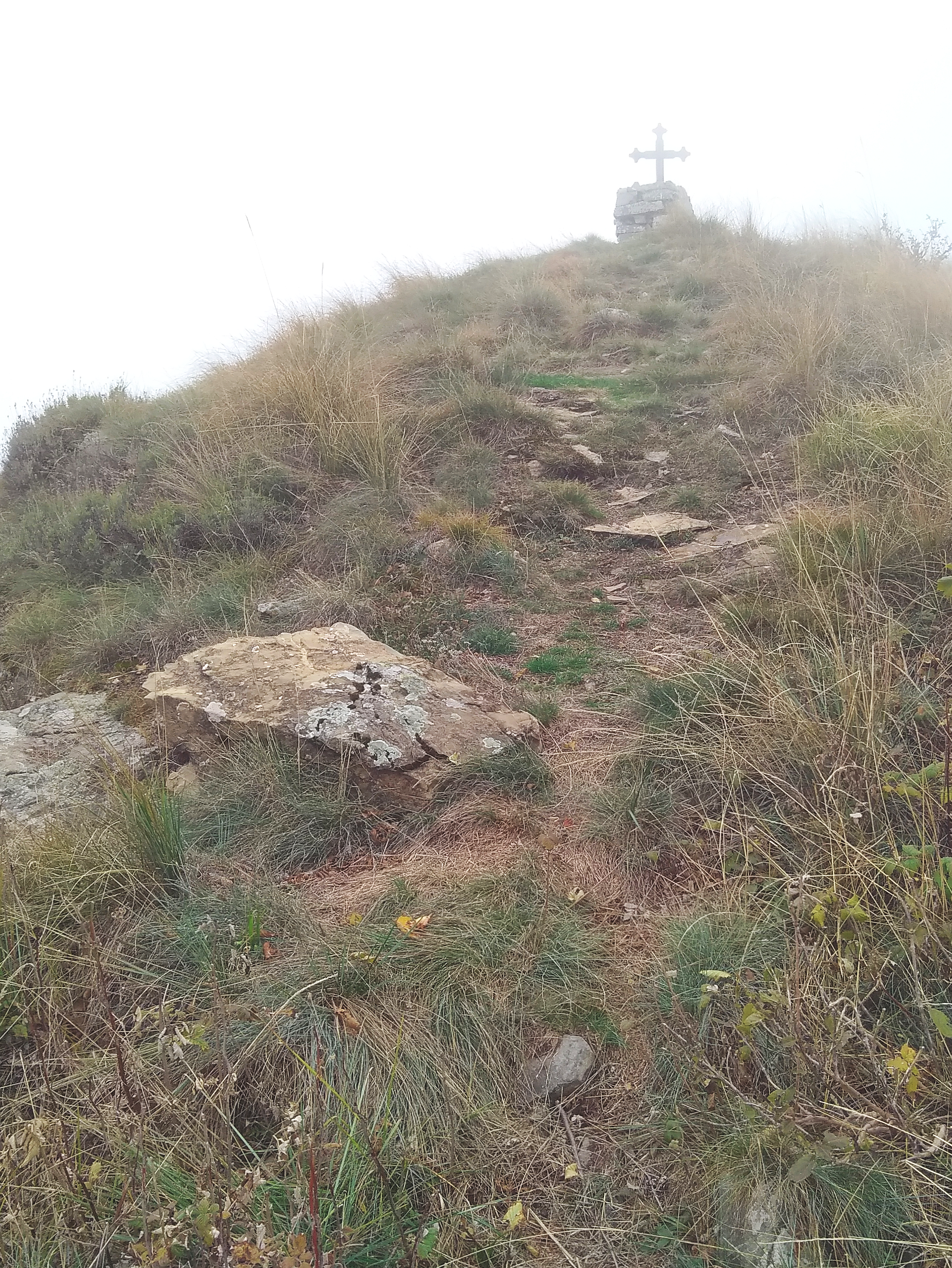
- The summit in a foggy day

Highest point
- Elevation: 1,610 m (5,280 ft)
- Prominence: 158 m (518 ft)
- Coordinates: 44°00′22.18″N 07°48′39.74″E

Geography
- Location within Alps
- Location: Liguria, Italy
- Parent range: Ligurian Alps

Climbing
- First ascent: ancestral
- Easiest route: from Colle del Garezzo or Passo della Teglia

Carmo di Brocchi is a 1,610-metre (5,282 ft) mountain of the Ligurian Alps, in Italy.

== Etymology ==
The mountain was in former times referred as Monte dei Brocchi. The term Carmo appears in several other Ligurian toponyms with the meaning of Mount.

== Geography ==
Carmo di Brocchi belongs to the province of Imperia, in Liguria. In the SOIUSA (International Standardized Mountain Subdivision of the Alps) it belongs to the Nodo del Monte Saccarello group and Costiera Monega-Carmo di Brocchi subgroup (SOIUSA code: I/A-1.II-A.1.b). Carmo di Brocchi is located on the ridge dividing the valleys of Argentina and Giara di Rezzo, which also is the border between the comuni of Rezzo and Molini di Triora. Its summit is marked by a cairn bearing a Summit cross end containing a summit register.

== Access to the summit ==
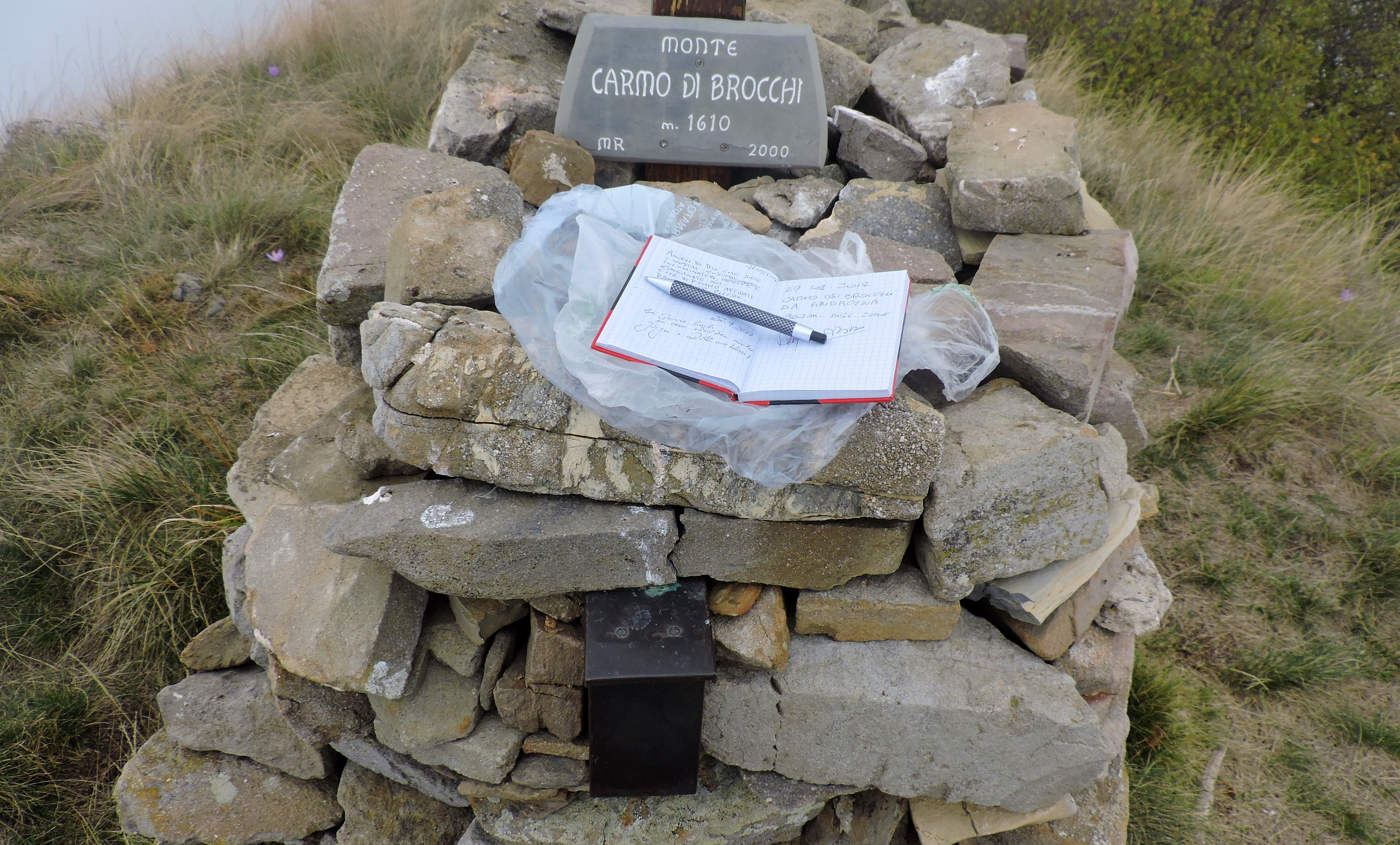
Summit register

The summit of Carmo di Brocchi can be reached on foot starting from Colle del Garezzo (NW) or from Passo della Teglia (SW).

== Nature conservation ==
The mountain is on the border of the Parco naturale regionale delle Alpi Liguri since 2007. In the area, black grouse can be seen, and there is a herd of chamois.

== Maps ==
- Italian official maps by Istituto Geografico Militare (IGM), 1:25.000 and 1:100.000 scale (also on line version)
- Carta dei sentieri e dei rifugi scale 1:50.000 nr. 15 Albenga, Alassio, Savona, I.G.C. - Turin
- Carta dei sentieri e stradale scala 1:25.000 nr. 23 Sanremo Ventimiglia Bassa val Roia Val Nervia, Fraternali editore - Ciriè
