= Monte Monega =

Mountain in Italy

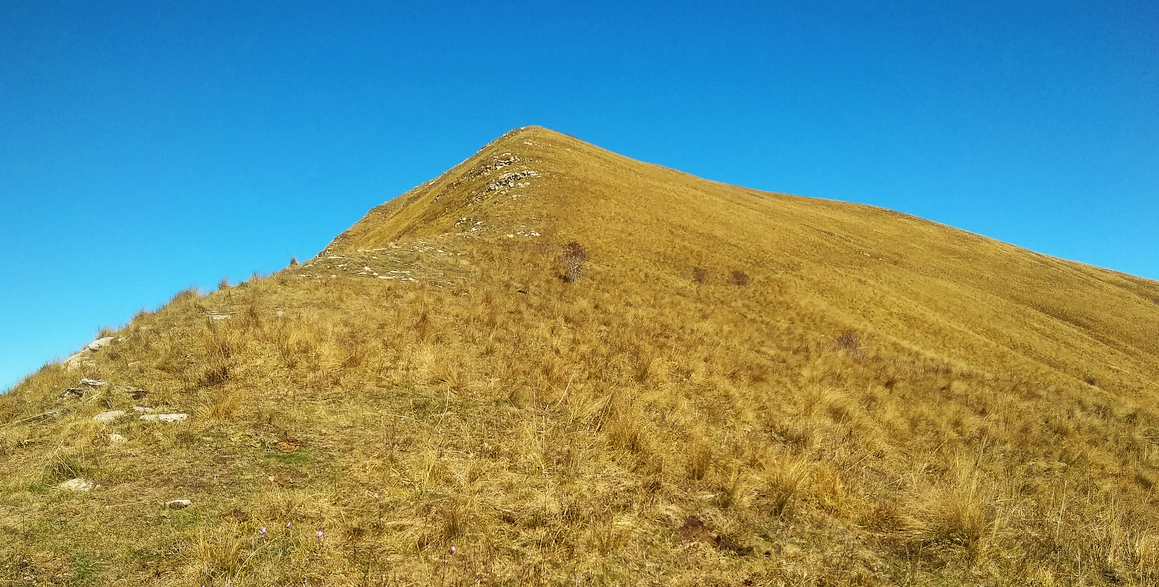
- Southern slopes of the mountain

Highest point
- Elevation: 1,882 m (6,175 ft)
- Prominence: 92 m (302 ft)
- Coordinates: 44°02′12.01″N 07°48′01.19″E

Geography
- Location within Alps
- Location: Liguria, Italy
- Parent range: Ligurian Alps

Climbing
- First ascent: ancestral
- Easiest route: from Colle del Garezzo or Passo della Teglia

Monte Monega is a 1,882-metre (6,175 ft) mountain of the Ligurian Alps, in Italy.

== Geography ==
The mountain belongs to the province of Imperia, in Liguria. In the SOIUSA (International Standardized Mountain Subdivision of the Alps) it belongs to the Nodo del Monte Saccarello group and Costiera Monega-Carmo di Brocchi subgroup (SOIUSA code: I/A-1.II-A.1.b). Monte Monega is the tripoint where the valleys of Argentina, Giara di Rezzo and Arroscia meet. Also the territories of three comuni (Montegrosso Pian Latte, Rezzo and Molini di Triora) meet on the top of the mountain, which is marked by a Summit cross. Its topographic prominence is of 92 metres.

== History ==
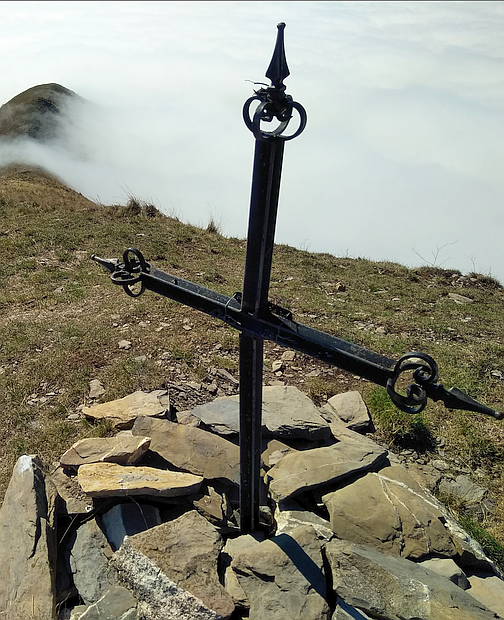
Summit cross

The slopes of Monte Monega were deforested during past centuries in order to increase pasture land. The highest part of the mountain is still used as a grazing area for local cattle, and maintains a good amount of biodiversity.

== Access to the summit ==
The summit of Monte Monega can be easily reached on foot starting from Colle del Garezzo (NW) or from Passo della Teglia (SW). The mountain in winter is a well known snowshoes hike.

== Conservation ==
The eastern side of the mountain since 2007 is included in the Parco naturale regionale delle Alpi Liguri.

== Maps ==
- Italian official maps by Istituto Geografico Militare (IGM), 1:25.000 and 1:100.000 scale (also on line version)
- Carta dei sentieri e dei rifugi scale 1:50.000 nr. 15 Albenga, Alassio, Savona, Istituto Geografico Centrale - Turin
- Carta dei sentieri e stradale scala 1:25.000 nr. 23 Sanremo Ventimiglia Bassa val Roia Val Nervia, Fraternali editore - Ciriè
