= Passo della Teglia =

Mountain pass in Italy

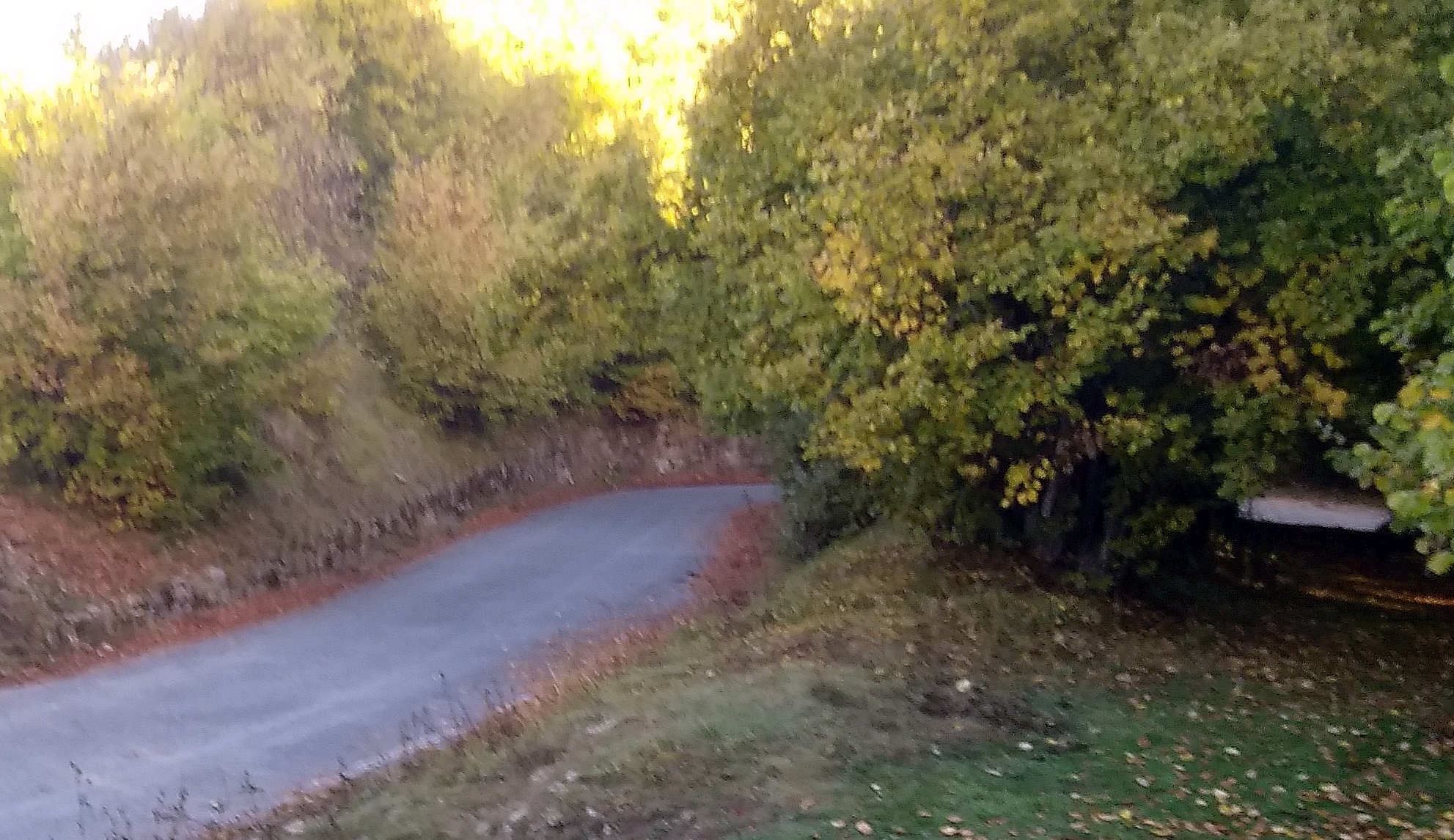

- Location within Alps
- Elevation: 1,385 metres (4,544 ft)
- Traversed by: Provincial road nr.17 di Passo Teglia

Third Approach
- Location: Liguria, Italy
- Range: Ligurian Alps
- Coordinates: 43°59′42″N 7°50′01″E

The Passo della Teglia (1385 m) is a mountain pass in the Province of Imperia (Italy). It connects Rezzo with Molini di Triora.

== Geography ==
The pass stands between Monte Pizzo (1417 m, NW) and Monte Fenaira (1457 m, SE). It is located on the ridge dividing the drainage basins of Arroscia and Centa, both tributaries of the Ligurian Sea.

Its eastern side is mainly occupied by a large beech forest named Bosco di Rezzo. Near the saddle stands a picnic place and some information panels about the peculiarities of the surrounding environment. The pass can be reached following the provincial road nr.17 di Passo Teglia both from Pieve di Teco, through Rezzo, or from Molini di Triora, through the village of Andagna.

== History ==
In former times the pass was crossed by the strada Marenca (Marenca road), an ancient route connecting the Riviera with the Ligurian mountains. The footpath which nowadays retraces it continues inland towards Monte Monega. The pass during the II World War saw some fights between local partisans and Nazi fascist troops.

The road which crosses the pass is at risk of landslides and several times was interrupted by them.

== Cycling and hiking ==
Passo della Teglia is a popular cyclists' climb. The road from Molini di Triora is considered enjoyable because it offers good views of the surrounding mountains and of the Italian Riviera and also for a very sparse car traffic. From the pass can be reached on foot Carmo di Brocchi and Monte Monega (SW).
