= Mongia =

Mongia or Monga is an Indian surname.

== Notable people ==
Notable people with the surname include:

- Ajay Monga (born 1968), Indian scriptwriter and film director
- Dinesh Mongia (born 1977), Indian cricketer
- Guneet Monga (born 1983), Indian filmmaker
- Mohit Mongia (born 1999), Indian cricketer, son of Nayan Mongia
- Nayan Mongia (born 1969), Indian cricketer
- R. S. Mongia (1940–2017), Indian judge
- Sunjoy Monga, Indian wildlife conservationist
- Vishal Monga, Indian American electrical engineer, researcher and academic

== See also ==
- Monga (disambiguation)
- Mongiana, Comune in Calabria, Italy
