= Monte Pietra Ardena =

Mountain of the Ligurian Alps

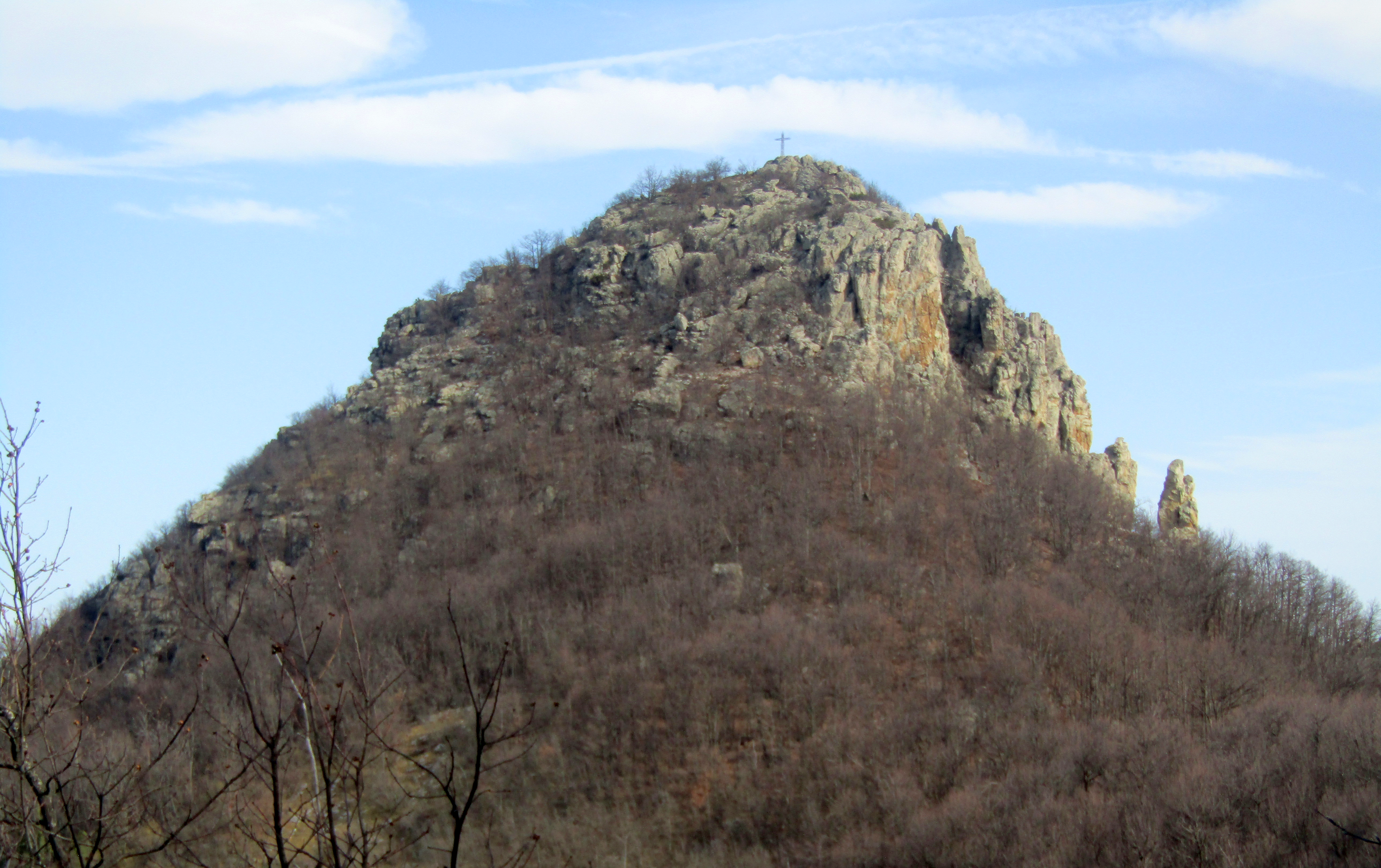
- View from the south

Highest point
- Elevation: 1,103 m (3,619 ft)
- Prominence: 128 m (420 ft)
- Coordinates: 44°11′25″N 8°01′18″E

Geography
- Location within Italy
- Country: Italy
- Province: Province of Cuneo
- Region: Piedmont

Mount Pietra Ardena is a mountain in the Ligurian Prealps with a height of 1103 m.

== Toponym ==
The mountain was also once called Pietra Degna.

== Description ==
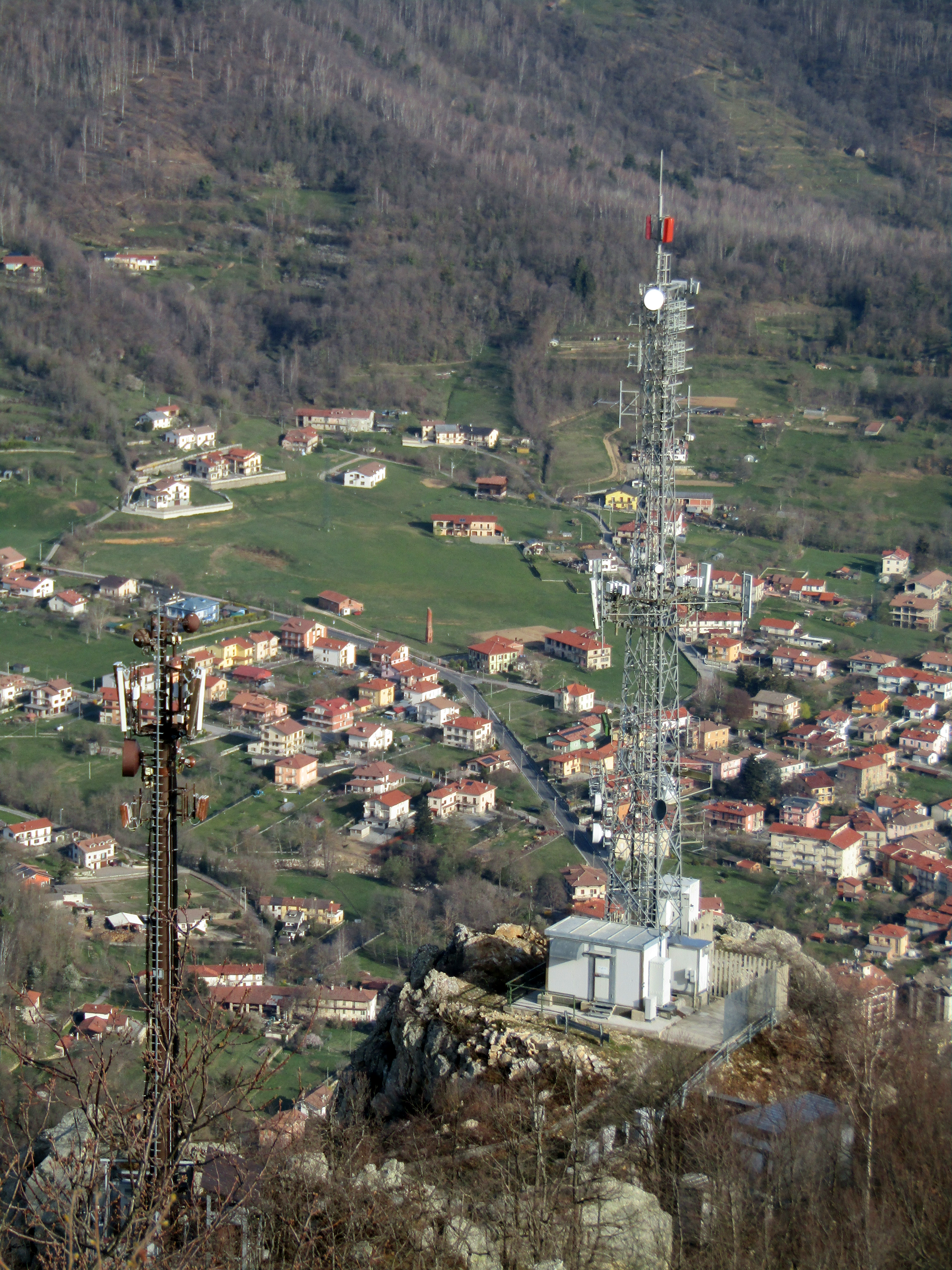
The antennas of Pietra Ardena, in the background the houses of Garessio

The mountain is located in the Upper Tanaro Valley, on the Po Valley side of the main Alpine chain. It falls within the territory of the municipality of Garessio, of which it dominates the main town. From the mountain rises southward a ridge that, after losing altitude with the Colletto del Pennino (969 m), rises with two unnamed reliefs at 1049 m and 1025 m, and then joins the main chain at Monte Pennino (1272 m). The topographic prominence of Pietra Ardena is 128 m, and its lowest point is located at the Colletto di Pennino. Just north of the summit are some telecommunication antennas. A metal summit cross stands on the summit point.

== Geology ==
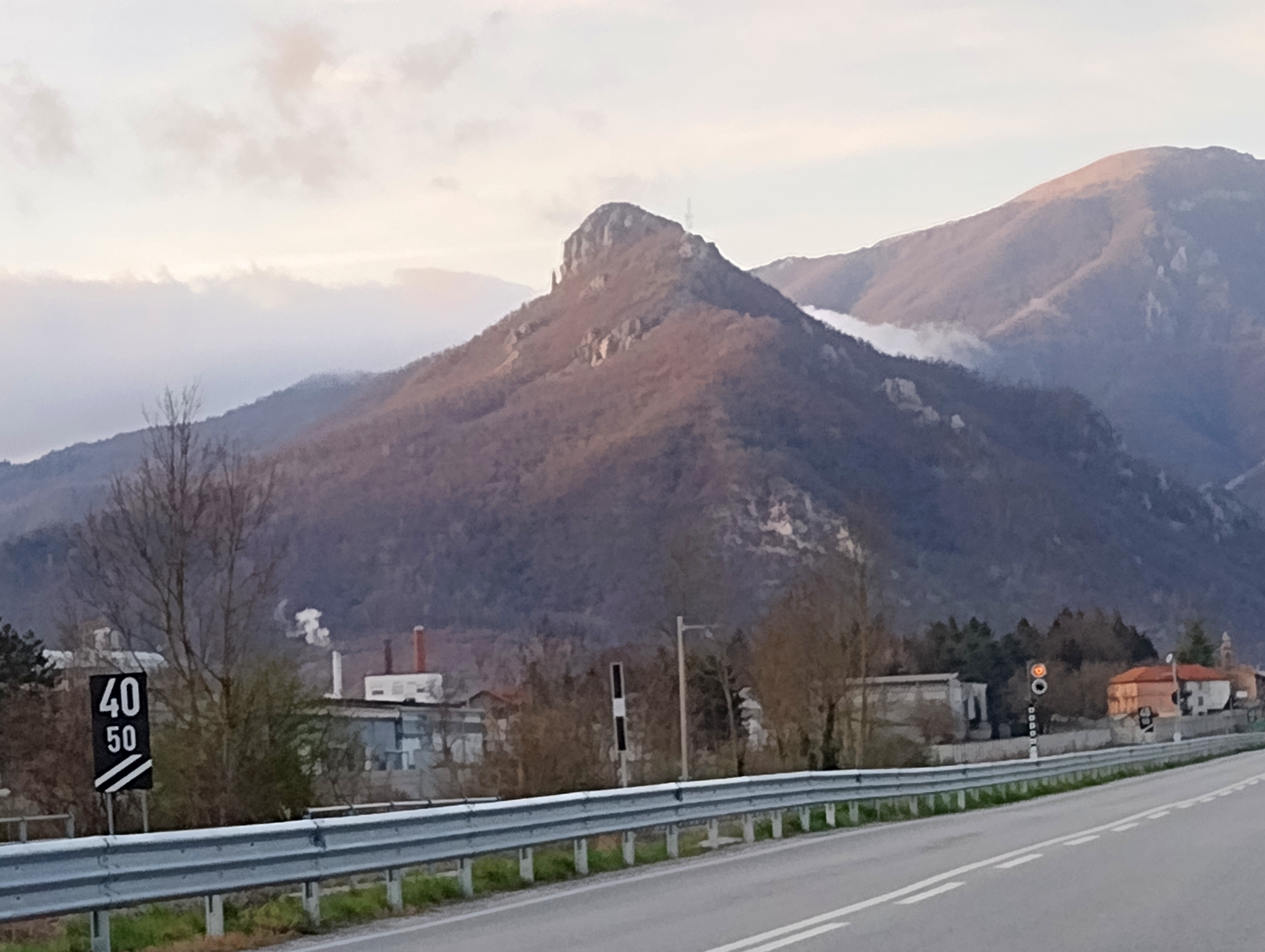
The mountain from the valley floor

Pietra Ardena consists of rocks of Triassic origin.

At the base of the mountain is a cave, long known among scholars for its entomofauna, and particularly for beetles. Also known as "Grotta del Falconiere" or "Garbo del Pare," it is located at an elevation of 680 meters and is around 20 meters long.

== History ==
The wooded area around the Pietra Ardena in the Middle Ages is said to have given refuge to Adelasia (or Alasia), daughter of Emperor Otto I of Saxony, and Aleramo, founder of the lineage of the March of Montferrat. The two, whose love was initially opposed by the girl's father, are said to have lived in those wild places working as charcoal burners until, thanks to the mediation of the bishop of Albenga, Aleramo was reconciled with his father-in-law. Historian Leandro Alberti, referring to the mountain by its ancient toponym Pietra Degna, brings in support of this legend the remains of a cistern that were located near the summit. In 1871 librettist Leopoldo Marenco titled his opera Il falconiere di Pietra Ardena after the story.

Near the top of the mountain the remains of trenches that the Savoy army built in preparation for the Battle of Loano in 1795 are still visible.

== Access to the summit ==
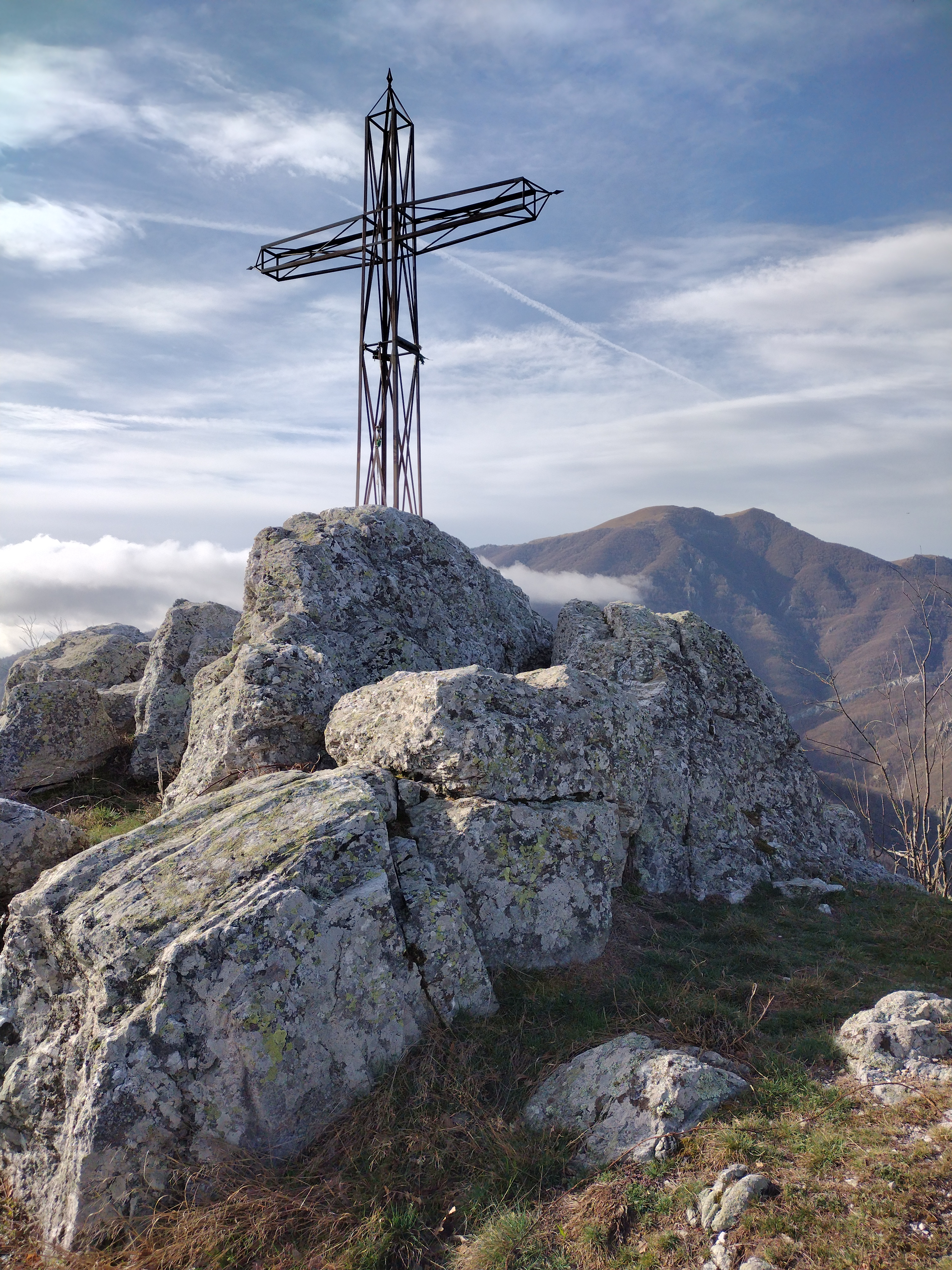
The summit cross and, in the background, Mount Galero

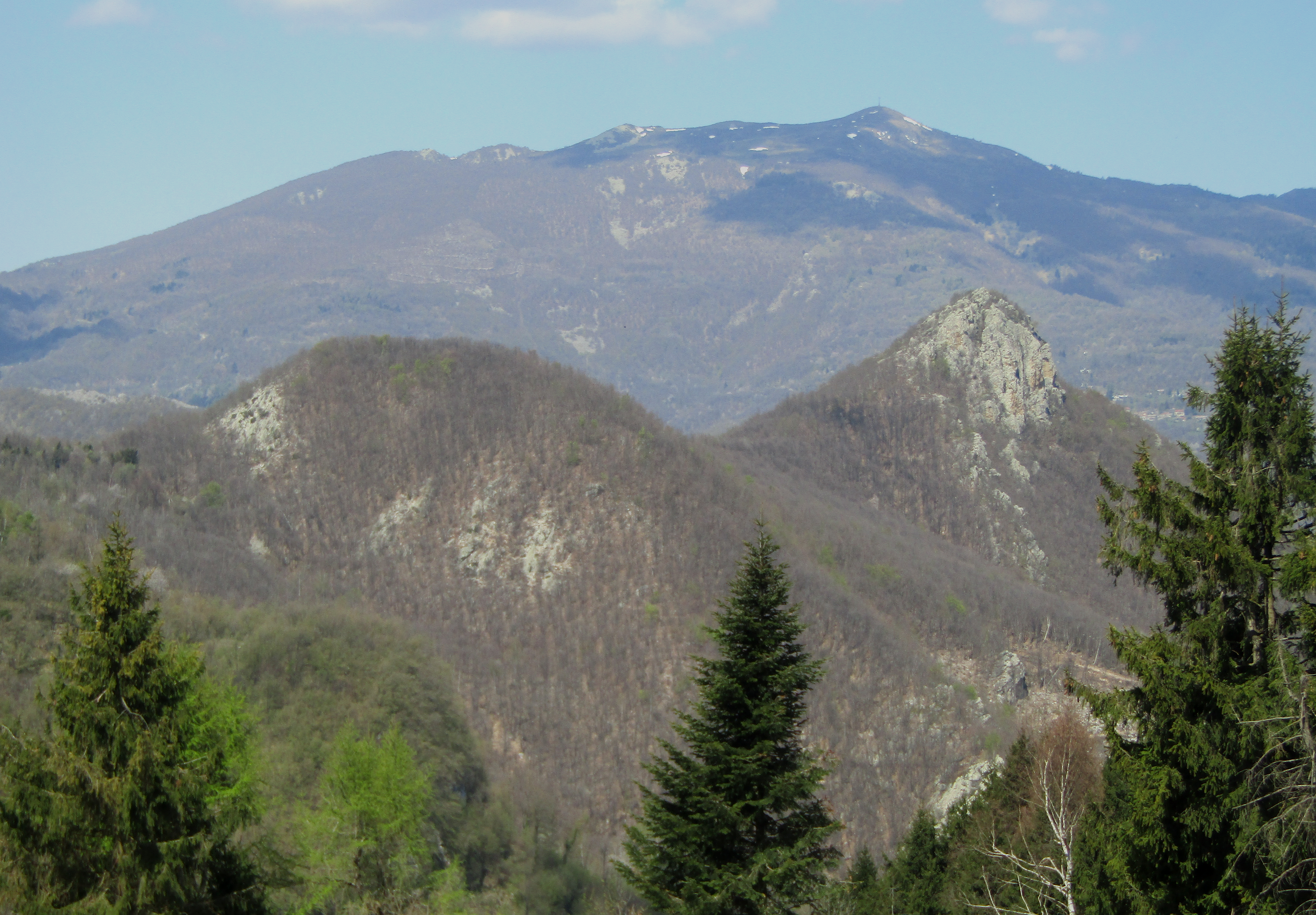
Pietra Ardena and, in the background, the Bric Mindino

The summit of Pietra Ardena can be reached by trail from various locations. One of the routes starts from the historic center of Garessio, reaching the summit after passing through the "Colletto di Pennino"; it is also possible to ascend from Colle San Bernardo.

== Mountaineering ==
While the ascent to the summit of Pietra Ardena is not of mountaineering interest, there are several rocky spires not far from it that offer climbing opportunities. The best known one is known locally as La Madonnina (or also as Madonna di Pietra Ardena); the first known ascent dates back to 1928 and was carried out by some members of the "Alpine Club" of Garessio. The pinnacle rises from the slopes of the mountain by about 30 meters and is made of solid rock of a calcareous nature.

== Other images ==
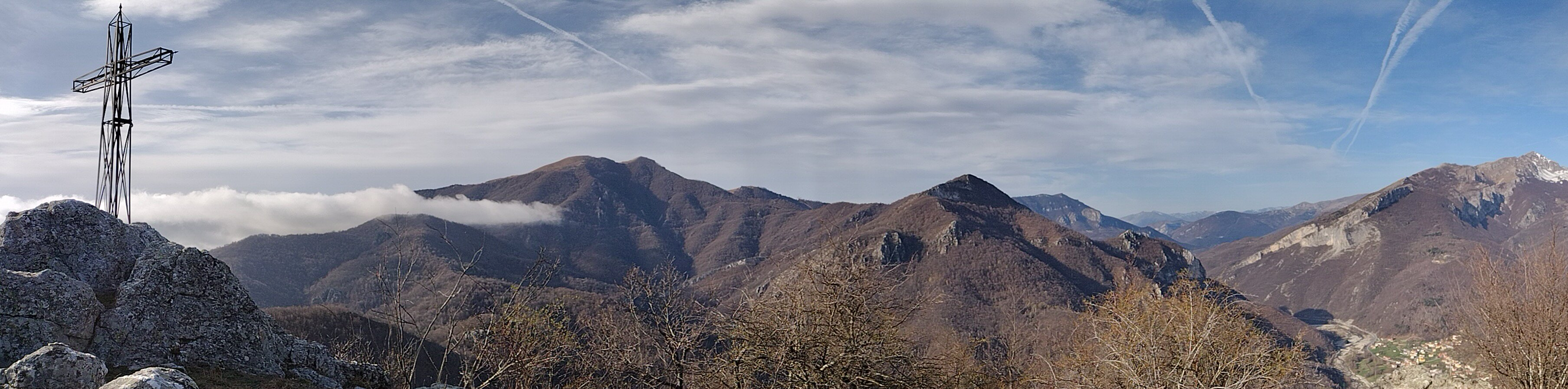
View looking southwest, with Mt. Galero to the right of the summit cross

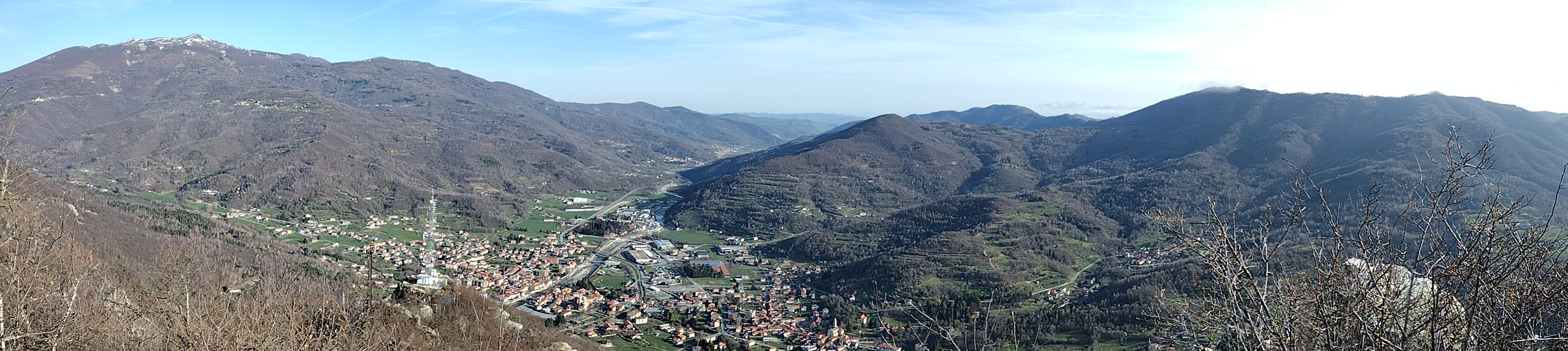
View looking north, with Bric Mindino on the left and, in the center, the village of Garessio

== See also ==
- Garessio

== Bibliography ==
- Montagna, Euro; Montaldo, Lorenzo (1981). Alpi Liguri. CAI-TCI.
- Marenco, Leopoldo (1871). Il falconiere di Pietra Ardena - Dramma in versi in tre atti ed un epilogo. Milano: C.Barbini.

Cartography

- Cartografia ufficiale italiana in scala 1:25.000 e 1:100.000. Istituto Geografico Militare.
- Carta dei sentieri e stradale scala 1:25.000 n. 26 Bassa val Tanaro Val Bormida e Cebano. Ciriè: Fraternali editore.
