= Monga =

Monga may refer to:

== Places ==
- Monga, New South Wales, Australia
- Monga, Ivory Coast, a village in Lagunes District, Ivory Coast
- Monga National Park, a park near Braidwood, New South Wales, Australia
- Monga River, in Colón Department, Honduras

== Other uses ==
- Monga (Bangladesh), a Bengali term referring to the yearly cyclical phenomenon of poverty and hunger in Bangladesh
- Monga (film), a 2010 Taiwanese gangster film
- Salsa monga, a subgenre of salsa music
- the original name for Wanhua, Taipei, Taiwan

== People with the surname ==
- Ajay Monga, an Indian filmwriter and director
- Guneet Monga, Indian film producer, founder of Sikhya Entertainment
- Jeremy Monga, English football player
- Sunjoy Monga, Indian wildlife photographer and naturalist
- Vishal Monga, Indian-American electrical engineer

== See also ==
- Mongo (disambiguation)
- Mengxia (disambiguation)
- Mengjia (disambiguation)
- Mongga, a locality on Kolombangara Island, Solomom Islands
