= Giara di Rezzo =

Stream in Liguria, Italy

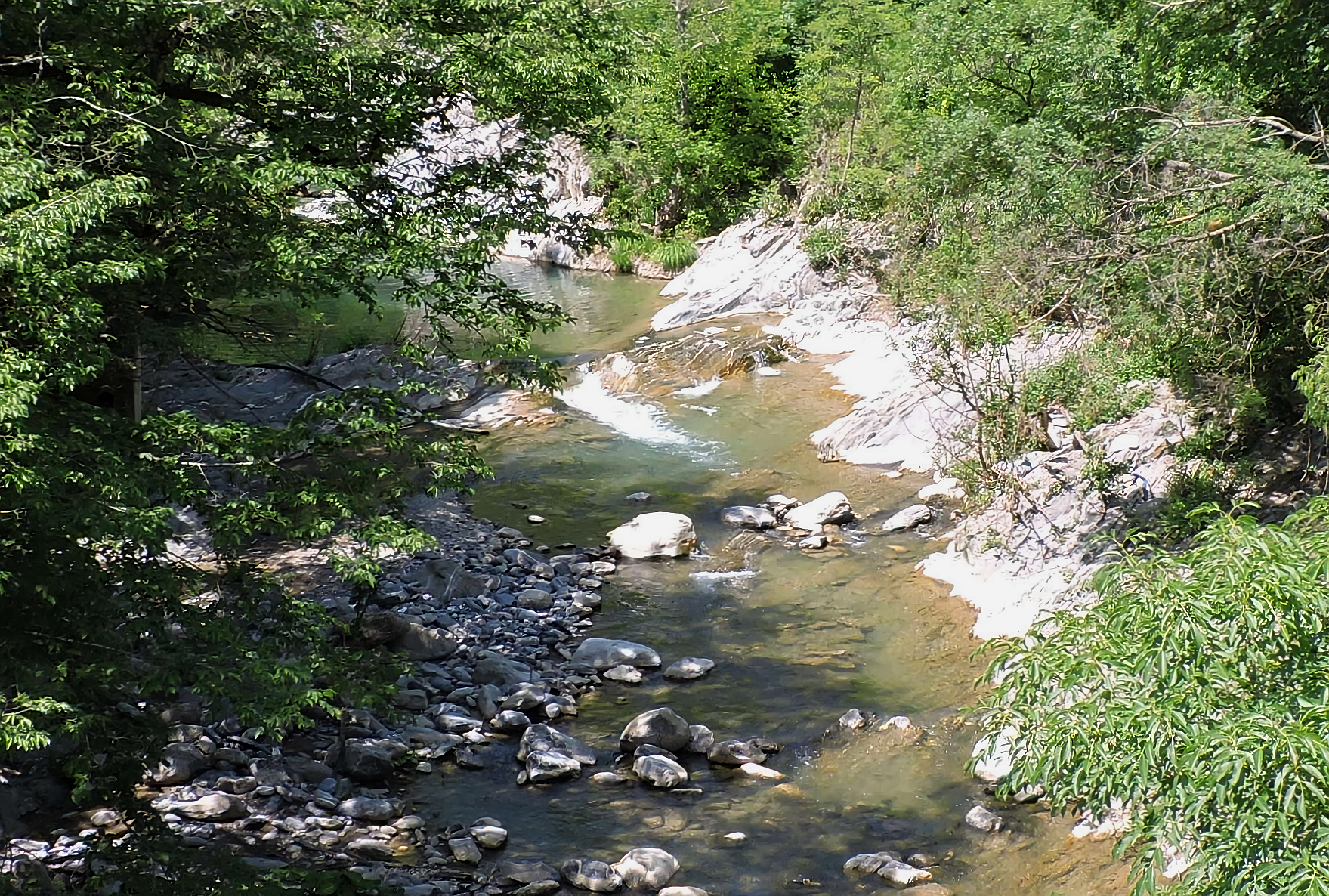

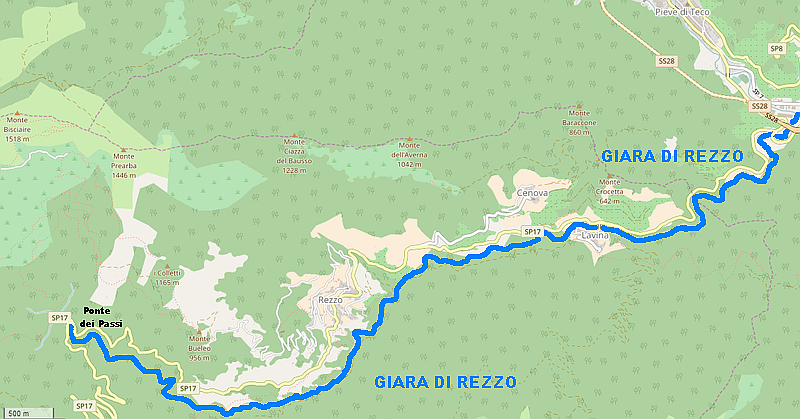

Location
- Country: Italy

Physical characteristics
- Source
  - location: Ponte dei Passi (Ligurian Alps)
  - coordinates: 44°01′11″N 7°50′16″E
  - elevation: 746 m (2,448 ft)
- Mouth: Arroscia
  - location: Paperera (Pieve di Teco, IM)
  - coordinates: 44°02′17″N 7°55′49″E
  - elevation: 220 m (720 ft)
- Length: 14 km (8.7 mi)
- Basin size: 39 km^{2} (15 mi^{2})

Basin features
- Progression: Arroscia→ Centa→ Ligurian Sea

The Giara di Rezzo is a 14-kilometre (8.7 mi) stream (in Italian torrente) of Liguria, Italy.

== Etymology ==
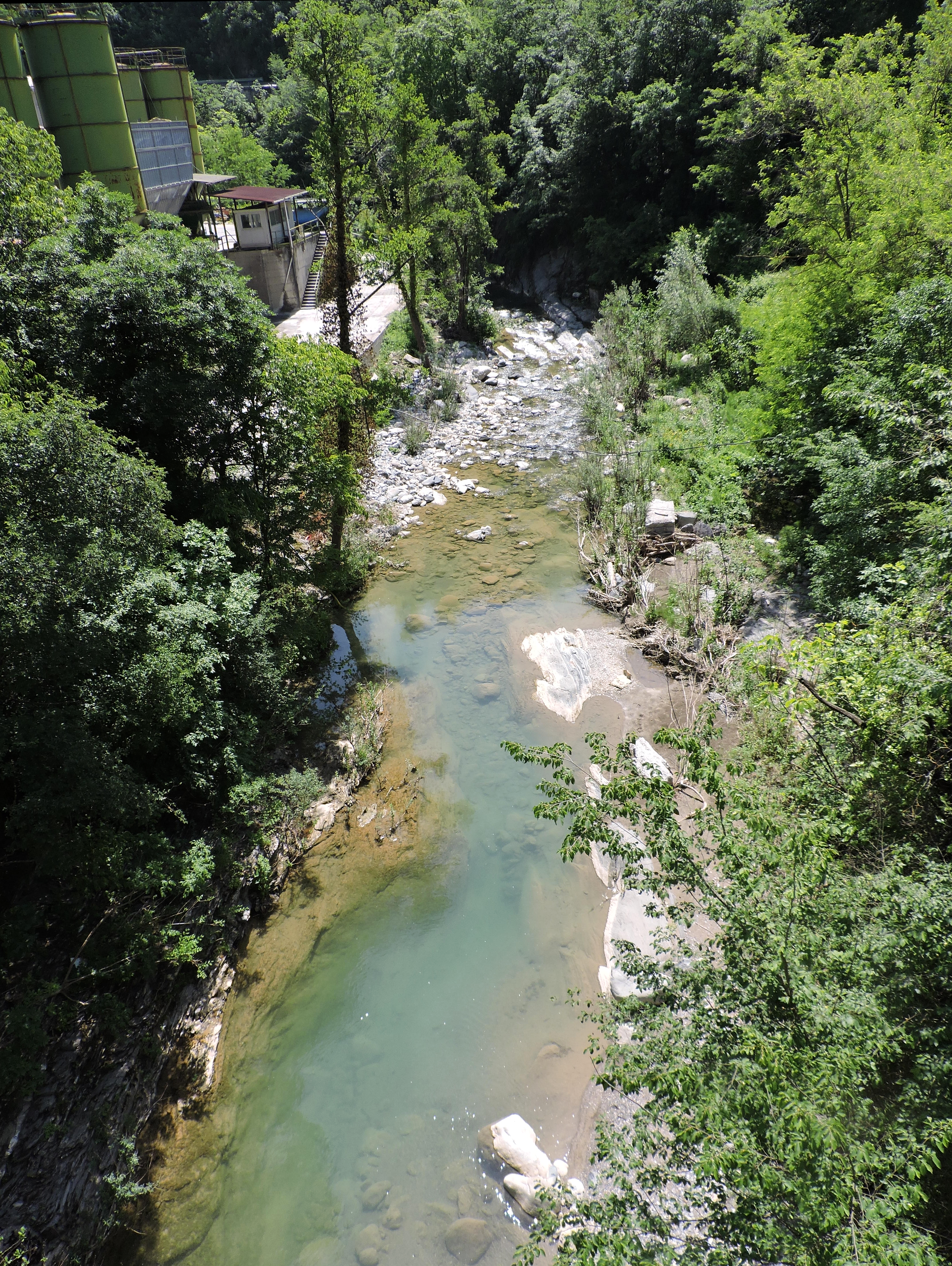
The Giara di Rezzo near its confluence in the Arroscia

The term giara is used in Western Liguria referring to creeks with large and gravelly beds; Rezzo is the main village of the middle valley of the Giara. The creek was also named torrente Lavina like the namesake village.

== Geography ==
The stream is formed in a place called ponte dei Passi from the union of three streams flowing down from the area of Monte Monega (Ligurian Alps): rio Teroselli, rio Giure and rio Conché. The Giara di Rezzo flows eastwards with a windy and recessed course, flanked by provincial road nr.17 Passo Teglia-Rezzo, which runs on its left high on the creek. While in comune of Pieve di Teco the Giara is trespassed by the former national road nr.453 della Valle Arroscia (nowadays provincial road nr.453) and a little further from the national road nr.28 del Colle di Nava. It ends joining the Arroscia from its right hand il Case Paperera, at around 215 m of elevation.

Giara di Rezzo basin (39 km2) is totally included in the Province of Imperia.

=== Main tributaries ===
- Right hand:
  - rio Roncobono,
  - rio Fonda,
  - rio Mainardo,
  - rio Vallasse,
  - rio Costette,
  - rio Lavinelle,
  - rio Omeu,
  - rio Acqua Fredda.
- Left hand:
  - rio Figallo,
  - rio del Galetto,
  - rio Quardella,
  - rio Sereo.

== Employment ==
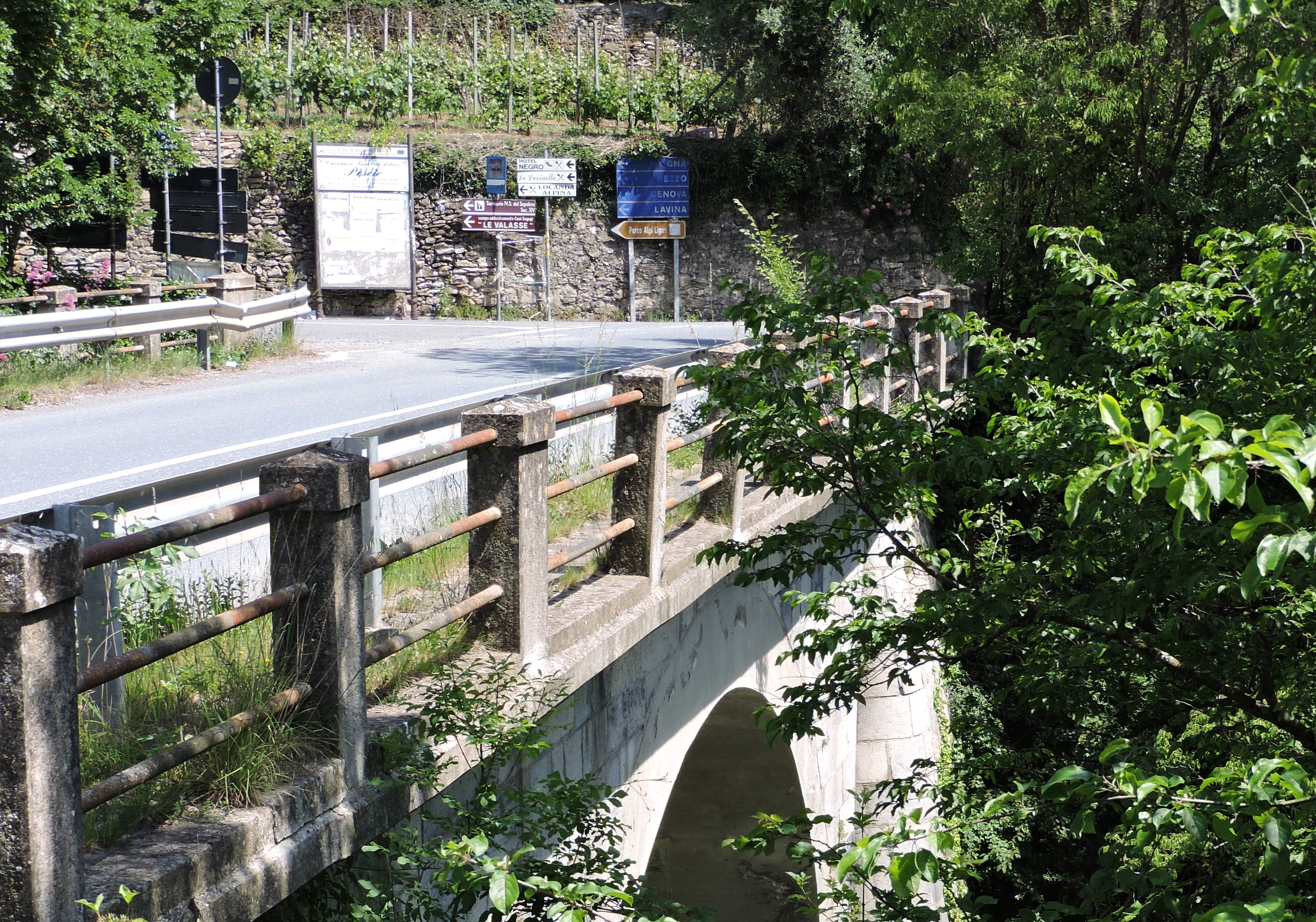
The bridge of statale della Valle Arroscia

In the high valley some freshwater sources are intercepted by the 'acquedotto Giara di Rezzo (Giara di Rezzo aqueduct), managed by AMAT of Imperia. With 47 km of pipes it dsupplies the comunis of Borgomaro, Lucinasco, Chiusavecchia, Chiusanico, Pontedassio and Imperia.

The uppermost segment of the creek is considered a trout fishing zone, while the lowermost one is a Cyprinidae / trout mixed fishing zone.

== Nature conservation ==
An upstream portion of Giara di Rezzo valley, located on the right hand of the creek, is included in two SIC (Site of Community Importance) named Bosco di Rezzo (code IT1315504) and M. Monega – M. Prearba (code IT1314609).

== See also ==
- List of rivers of Italy

Media related to Giara di Rezzo at Wikimedia Commons
