= Cisano =

Cisano may refer to one of the following localities in Italy:

- Cisano Bergamasco, a comune in the province of Bergamo, Lombardy.
- Cisano sul Neva, a comune in the province of Savona, Liguria.
- Cisano sul Garda, a frazione of the comune of Bardolino, in the province of Verona.
