= Bric Mindino =

Mountain in the Ligurian Alps, Italy

- Monte Mindino
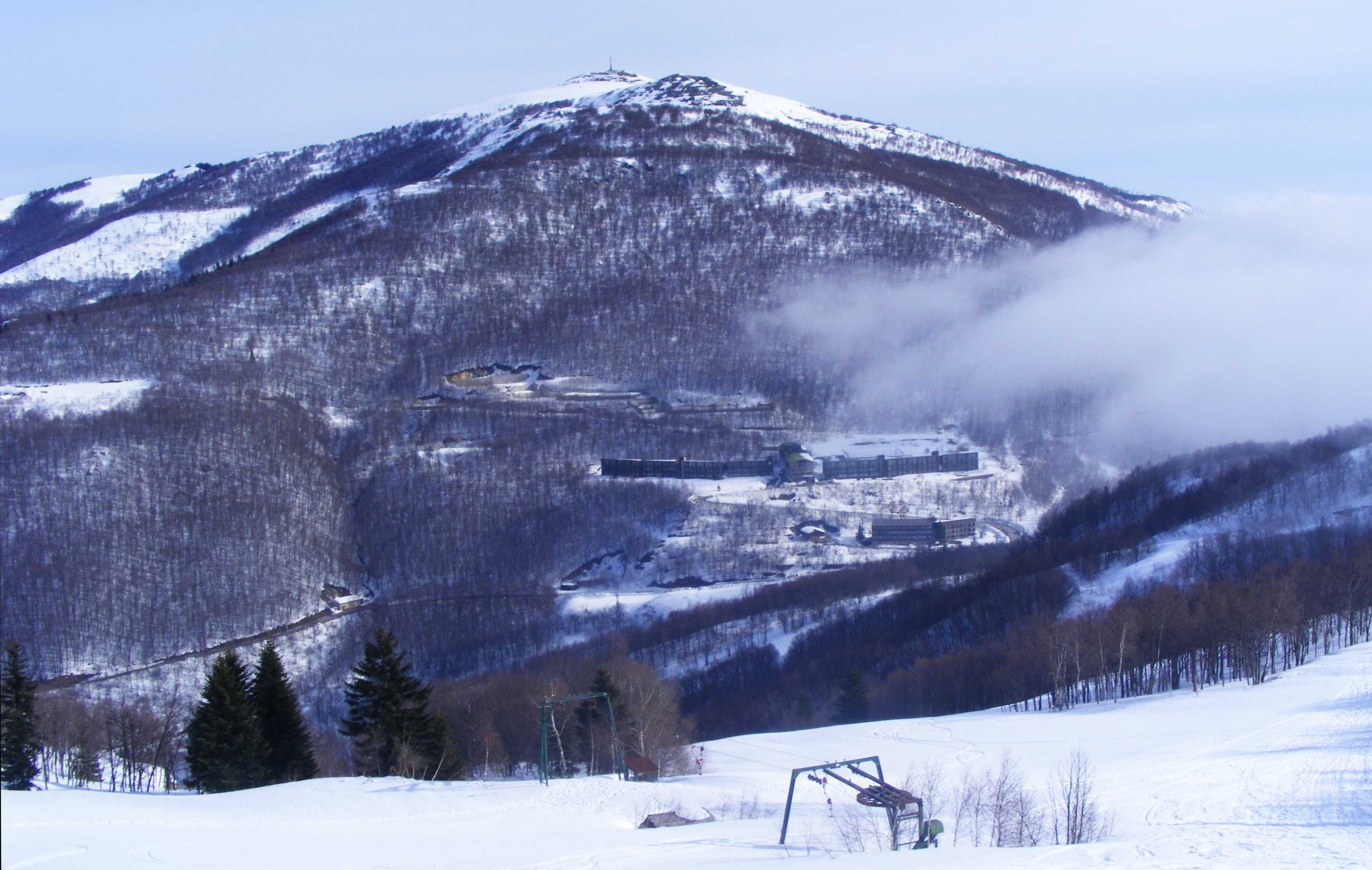
- The mountain seen from Monte Berlino

Highest point
- Prominence: 498 m (1,634 ft)
- Coordinates: 44°14′12″N 7°57′15″E

Geography
- Province: Cuneo
- Region: Piedmont
- Parent range: Alps

The Bric Mindino is a peak in the Ligurian Alps with an elevation of 1,879 meters above sea level. Administratively, it belongs to the municipality of Garessio (CN) and is situated at the convergence of Tanaro, Val Casotto, and Valle Mongia.

== Description ==
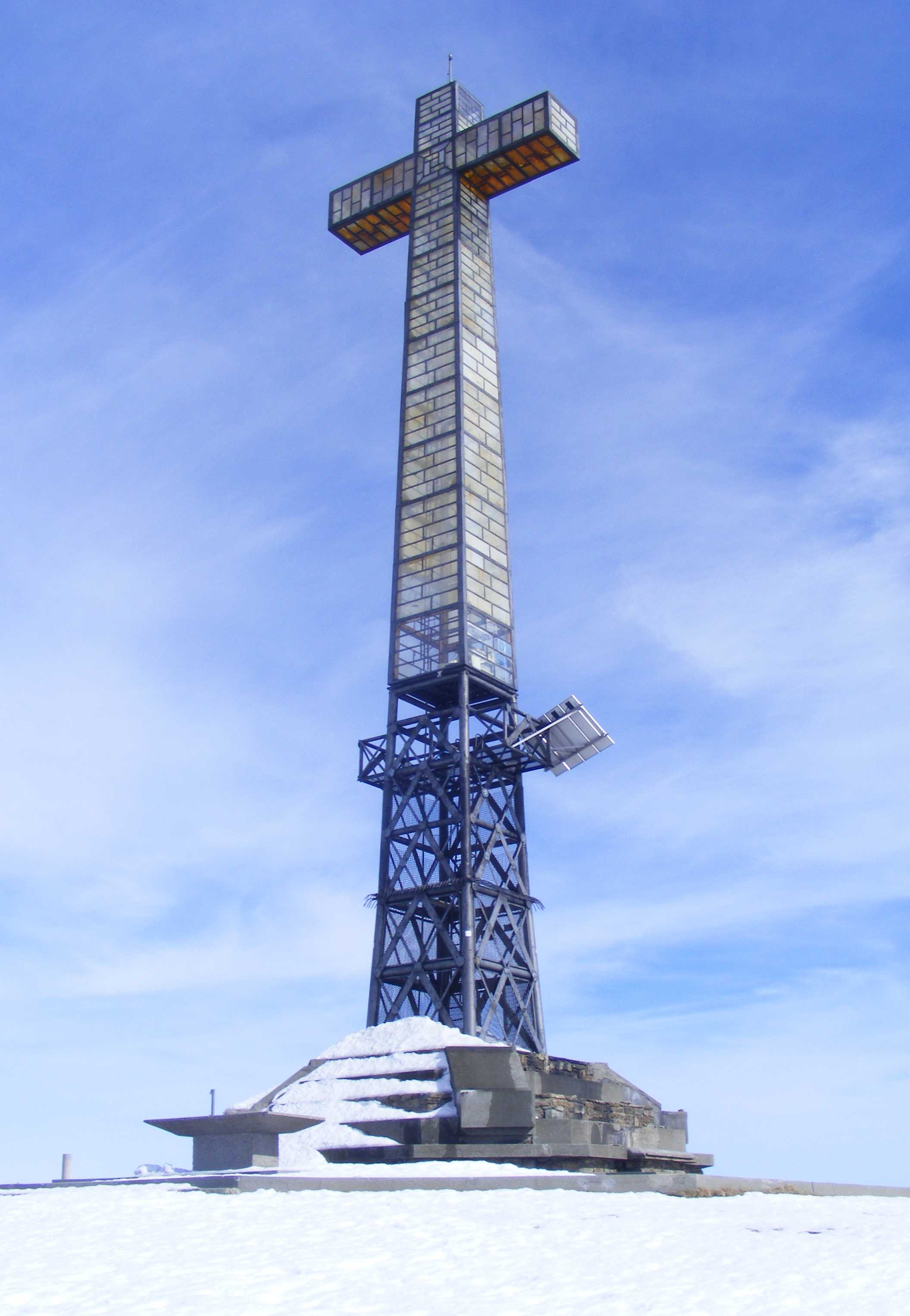
The large summit cross

The mountain rises in isolation northeast of the Colla di Casotto; at its summit, the watershed of the Tanaro converges with those of the Mongia and Corsaglia streams. The area is characterized by relatively rounded reliefs with gentle slopes; from the mountain's summit, a long ridge extends northward, separating the Val Corsaglia from the Valle Mongia, which then drops sharply north of Piano Stopè (1738 m). The Mongia/Tanaro ridge descends to the Colle di San Giacomo (1059 m), then rises again with the Bric Ciarandella.

In this area, during the 1970s, the ski facilities of Saint Gréé were developed.

On the western slope of Bric Mindino, the Casotto stream originates, while the Mongia stream begins on its northern slopes.

The mountain is accessible by a dirt road connecting it to the Colla di Casotto. At its highest point stands a monumental cross, 25 meters tall, made of metal, glass, and concrete, equipped with a powerful lighting system. This cross was inaugurated in 1969 at the initiative of the parish priest of Mindino, a hamlet of Garessio, in memory of the fallen of all wars. Due to its isolated position, the summit offers an extensive panorama that, under optimal visibility conditions, extends from Corsica to the Apennines and much of the Alpine arc.

== Access to the summit ==
Due to the beauty of the panorama and the ease of access from all sides, Bric Mindino is a popular hiking destination, especially at the start of the season or when more challenging routes are impractical for various reasons. On foot, the most well-known ascent route starts from the Colla di Casotto and follows partly a dirt road and partly a trail. The mountain can also be reached from the hamlet of Valcasotto (Pamparato) or, in just over three hours of walking, from Saint Gréé.

Bric Mindino can also be accessed by mountain bike; in addition to the routes from Colla di Casotto and Viola-Saint Gréé, it is also possible to ascend from Garessio.

The winter ascent with snowshoes from Colla di Casotto is considered, due to its ease of access and absence of dangers, a suitable outing for those trying this form of hiking for the first time.

== Environment ==
Bric Mindino, together with Monte Galero, forms the southeastern boundary of the Alpine range of the "black grouse" or "rock ptarmigan".

== Bibliography ==
- Cartografia ufficiale italiana in scala 1:25.000 e 1:100.000 [Official Italian cartography at scales 1:25,000 and 1:100,000] (in Italian). Istituto Geografico Militare.
- Carta dei sentieri e stradale scala 1:25.000 n. 22 Mondovì Val Ellero Val Maudagna Val Corsaglia Val Casotto [Trail and road map scale 1:25,000 no. 22 Mondovì Val Ellero Val Maudagna Val Corsaglia Val Casotto] (in Italian). Ciriè: Fraternali editore.
- Carta in scala 1:50.000 n. 8 Alpi Marittime e Liguri [Map scale 1:50,000 no. 8 Maritime and Ligurian Alps] (in Italian). Turin: Istituto Geografico Centrale.
