= Neva (Italy) =

Stream in Liguria, Italy

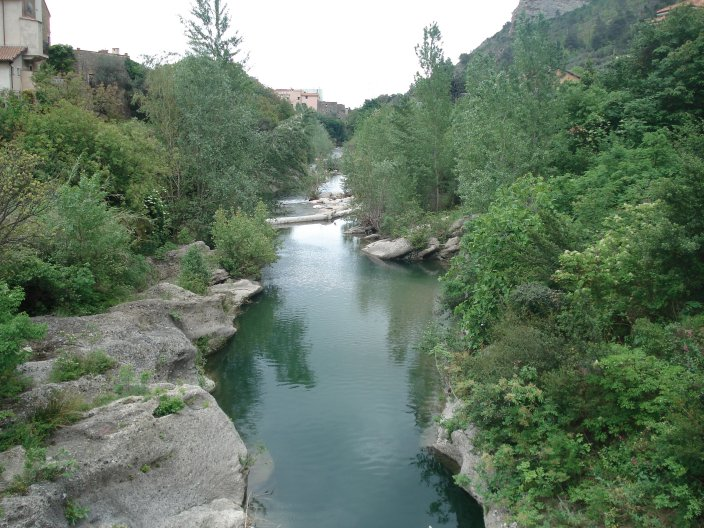
- The Neva in Cisano

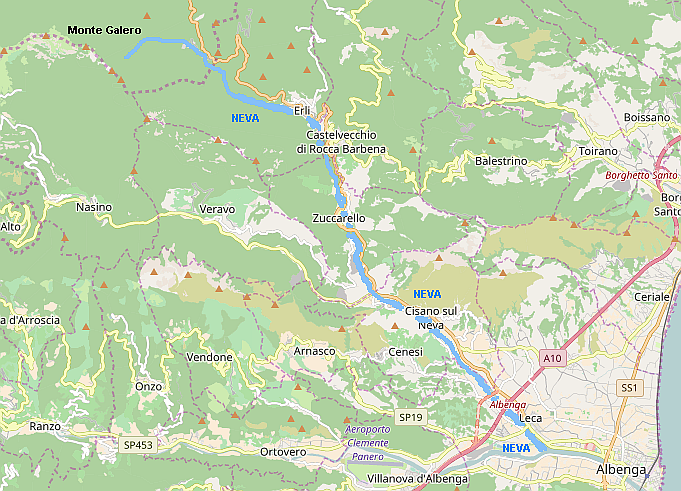

Location
- Country: Italy

Physical characteristics
- Source
  - location: SE slopes of Monte Galero (Ligurian Alps)
- Mouth
  - location: Centa in Albenga (SV)
  - coordinates: 44°03′14″N 8°11′16″E
  - elevation: 5 m (16 ft)
- Length: 22 km (14 mi)
- Basin size: 140 km^{2} (54 mi^{2})

Basin features
- Progression: Centa→ Ligurian Sea

The Neva is a 22-kilometre (14 mi) torrent or stream of Piemonte and Liguria (Italy).

== Geography ==
The creek is formed in Piemonte (comune of Garessio) near the Monte Galero, in the Ligurian Prealps. It then flows southeast and after a few kilometres it enters in Liguria crossing the territories of Erli, Castelvecchio di Rocca Barbena and Zuccarello. A little upstream of Cisano sul Neva it gets from the right hand its main tributary, the Pennavaira. Close to its mouth the Neva is crossed by State highway Aurelia bis and Autostrada dei Fiori. In Leca (comune of Albenga), joining the Arroscia, it forms the Centa, one of the most relevant rivers of Liguria.

Neva basin (140 km2) is mainly included in the Province of Savona, with a little part located in its NW side belonging to Piemonte.

=== Main tributaries ===
- Right hand:
  - rio Bossolasco,
  - torrente Pennavaira,
  - rio Sant'Antonio.
- Left hand:
  - rio Collarea,
  - rio Vernea,
  - rio Ciosi.

== Discharge ==
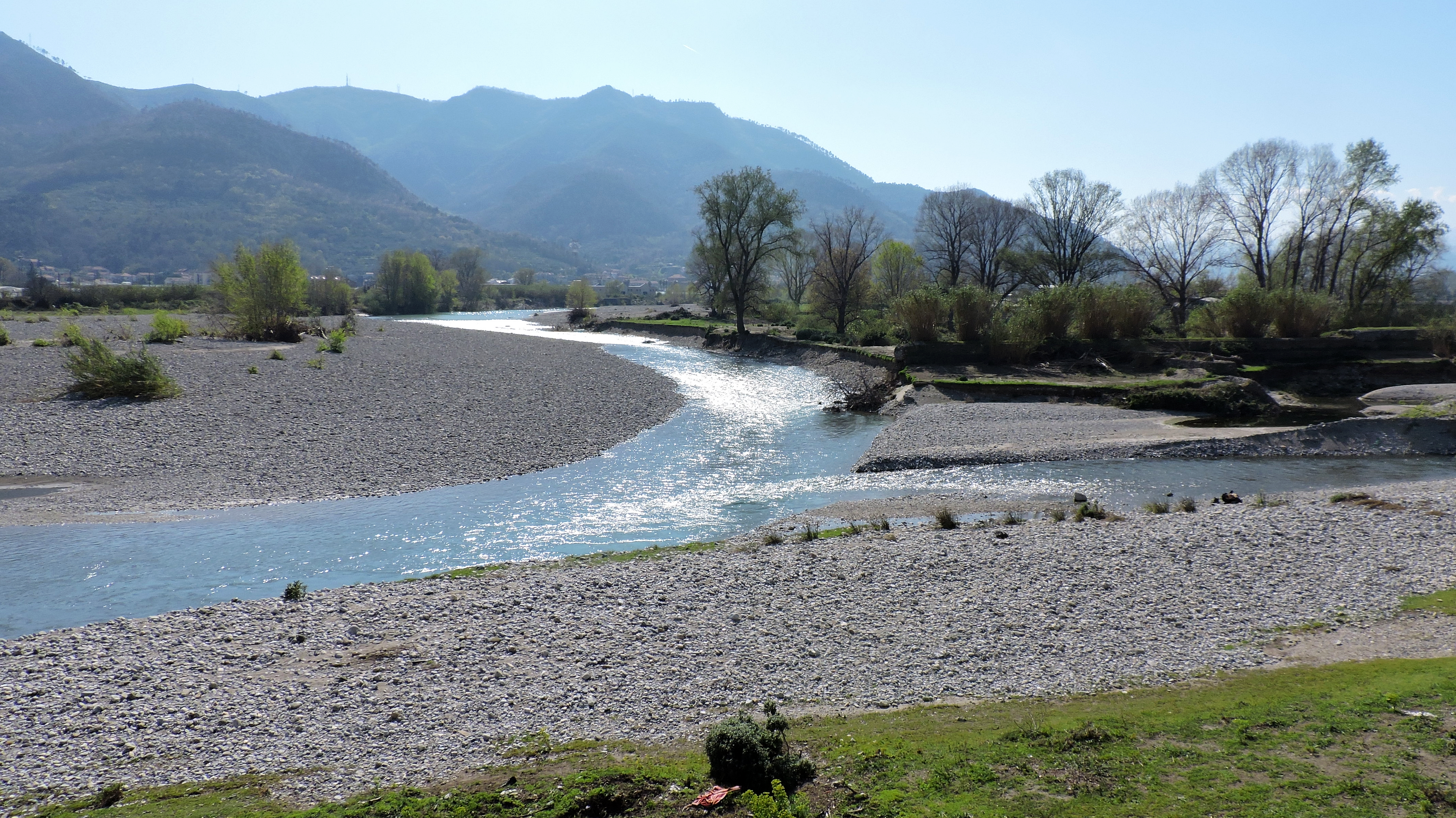
Arroscia and Neva (on the right) confluence

The discharge of the Neva is extremely variable, characterized by violent floods during the autumn and long periods of low flows during the summer.

== See also ==
- List of rivers of Italy

Media related to Neva (Italy) at Wikimedia Commons
