= Mengxia =

Mengxia (Chinese: 艋舺) may refer to:

- Wanhua District, a district in Taipei, Taiwan, originally called Mengxia (alternatively spelled Monga, Mengjia, Mongka, etc.)
- Monga (film), a period film set and filmed in Wanhua District

== Item named after Mengxia ==
- Bangka Park, a park in Wanhua District

== See also ==
- Monga (disambiguation)
- Mengjia (disambiguation)
