= Lavina, Rezzo =

Lavina
- Frazione
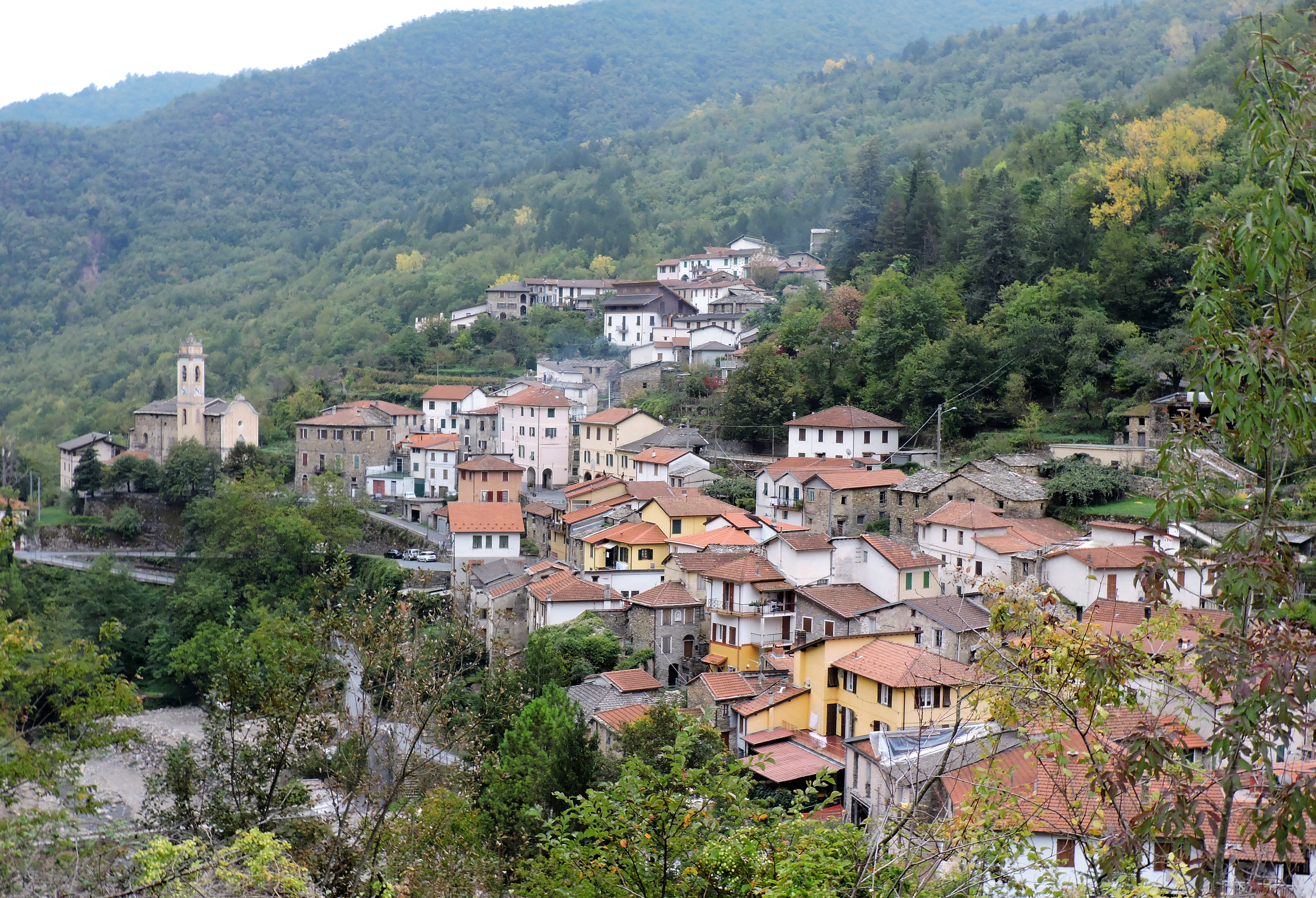
- Village centre

- Location of Lavina in Italy
- Coordinates: 44°01′37.63″N 7°54′03.91″E
- Country: Italy
- Region: Liguria
- Province: Imperia (IM)
- Comune: Rezzo
- Elevation: 350 m (1,150 ft)

Population (2001)
  - Total: 103
- Time zone: UTC+1 (CET)
  - Summer (DST): UTC+2 (CEST)
- Postal code: 18026
- Dialing code: (+39) 0183

Lavina is a frazione (and parish) of the municipality of Rezzo, in Liguria, northern Italy. Up to 1928 it was a self-standing comune.

== Geography ==
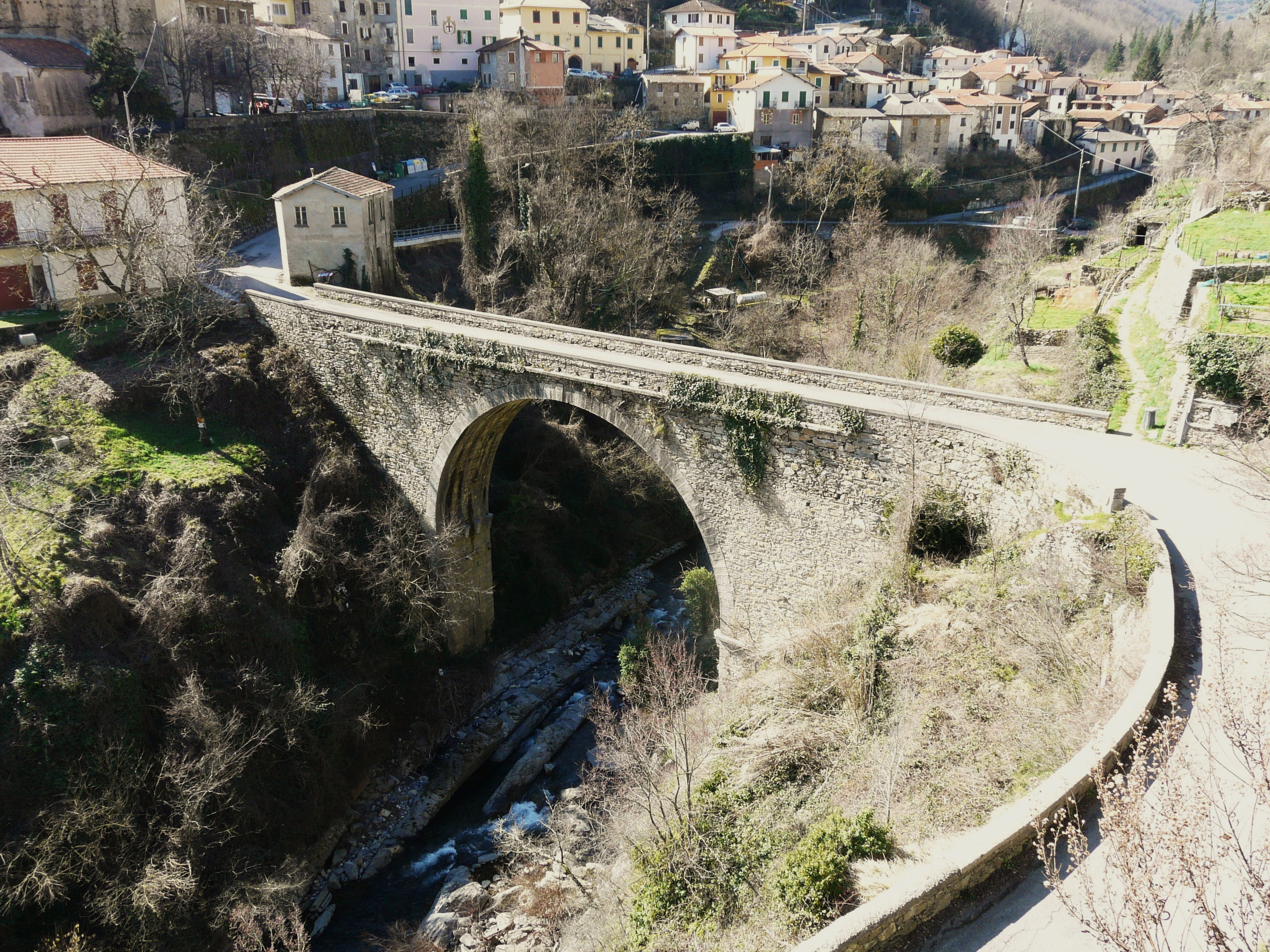
Giara di Rezzo bridge

The village of Lavina is located close to the Giara di Rezzo, mostly on its right banks, while the hamlet of Borghetto is on the opposite side of the creek. The former comune of Lavina also encompassed woodland and meadows on the surrounding mountain slopes, thus permitting some cattle breeding.

The area of Lavina is prone to landslides, which caused heavy damages both in the past and in recent years.

== History ==
A first document referring to Lavina is of 1320 and mentions the parish church of Sant'Antonio Abate. The "Statuti di Lavina" (Statutes of Lavina) were written in 1357, when the village was part of the Maro feud. Those statutes regulated several mattere like the use of pastures and waters, municipal and judicial offices and several aspects of property transferts. In 1455 Lavina was given by the House of Ventimiglia to the Lascaris, along with the rest of the valley, and so it passe under the control of the Contea di Tenda (Tende's county). Generally speaking Lavina followed the fate of Rezzo and of its valley, which was later absorbed by casa Savoia. The village was originally located in a place high on the river but it was destroyed by a landslide and had to be reconstructed in the present-day location. Between the 18th and 19th century, during the period defined by some historians as the French Regime, the comune of Lavina was united with the neighbouring comune of Cenova. Both the villages obtained their autonomy at the end of the First French Empire and maintained it until 1928. In that year they were both absorbed by the comune of Rezzo, so that the whole Giara valley was unified from the administrative point of view.

== Relevant buildings ==
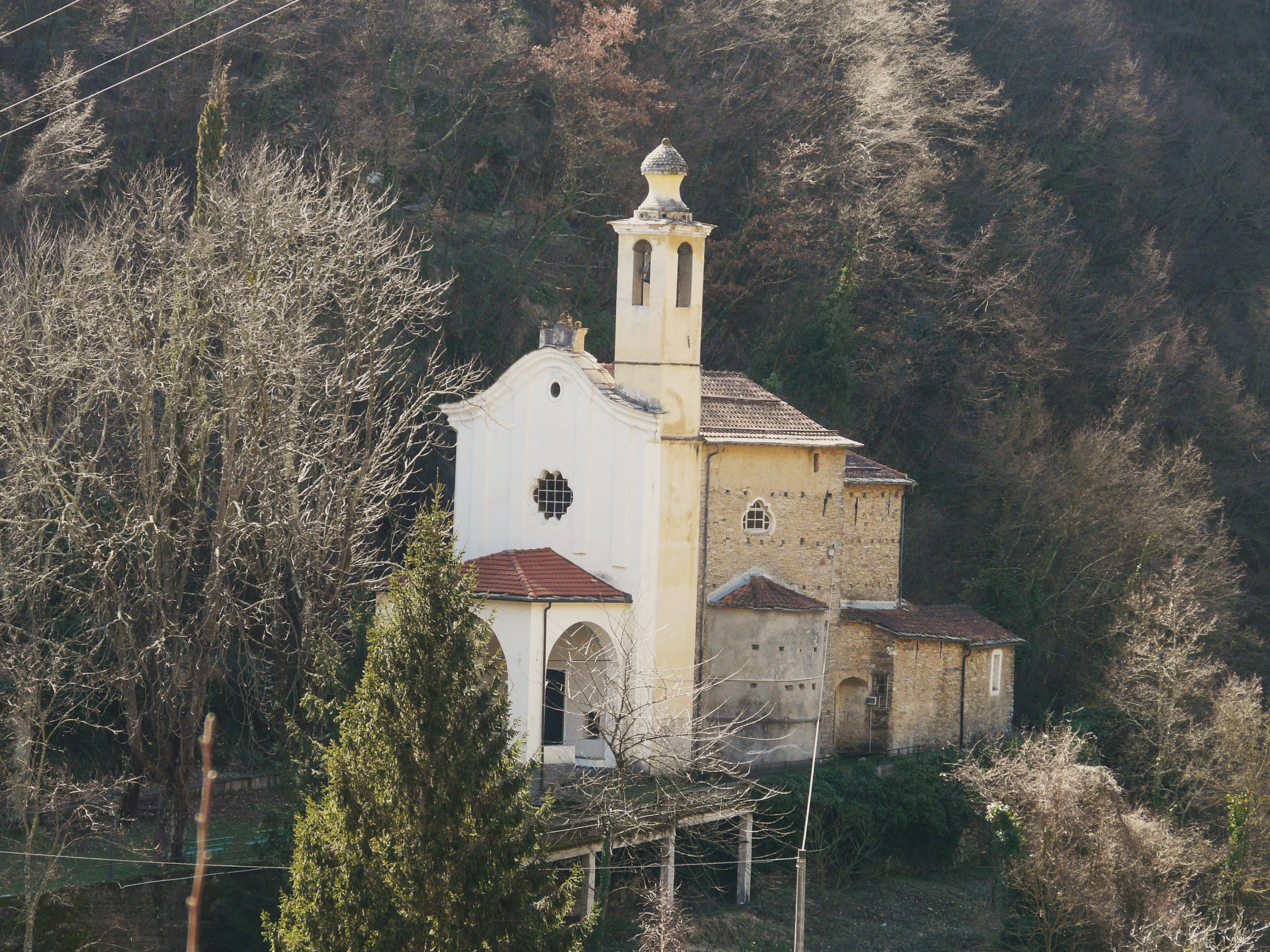
Santuario della Madonna della Neve

- Sant’Antonio Abate parish church, built in a late-baroque style in 1725 on a pre-existing building of the 16th century;
- Madonna della Neve sanctuary;
- Saint Jean the Baptist's oratory, dating back to the 16th century and located close to the parish church;
- Saint Pantaleo chapel, with a triptych of the late 16th century;
- Saint Bernard's chapel, standing outside the village centre and still bearing some ancient frescoes.

== Culture ==
Three architects who worked in Liguria and Piedmont between the 16th and 17th centuries were born in Lavina:

- Giovanni Antonio Ricca il Vecchio (the Old),
- Giovanni Antonio Ricca il Giovane (the Young), 1688-1748,
- Antonio Maria Ricca, 1660-1725.

== Bibliography ==
- Zuccagni-Orlandini, Attilio (1837). Corografia fisica, storica e statistica dell'Italia e delle sue isole corredata di un atlante (in Italian). p. 39.
