= Mengjia =

Mengjia may refer to:

- Mengjia Town, a town in Faku County, Liaoning, China
- Mengjia Township, a township in Hulan District, Harbin, Heilongjiang, China
- Wanhua District, a district in Taipei, Taiwan, originally called Mengjia (alternatively spelled Monga, Mengxia, Mongka, etc.)
  - Bangka Park, a park in Wanhua District
  - Monga (film), a period film set and filmed in Wanhua District

== See also ==
- Meng Jia (born 1990), Chinese entertainer and former member of the girl group Miss A
- Mengxia (disambiguation)
- Monga (disambiguation)
