= Tumbhi =

Online community for artists and art lovers

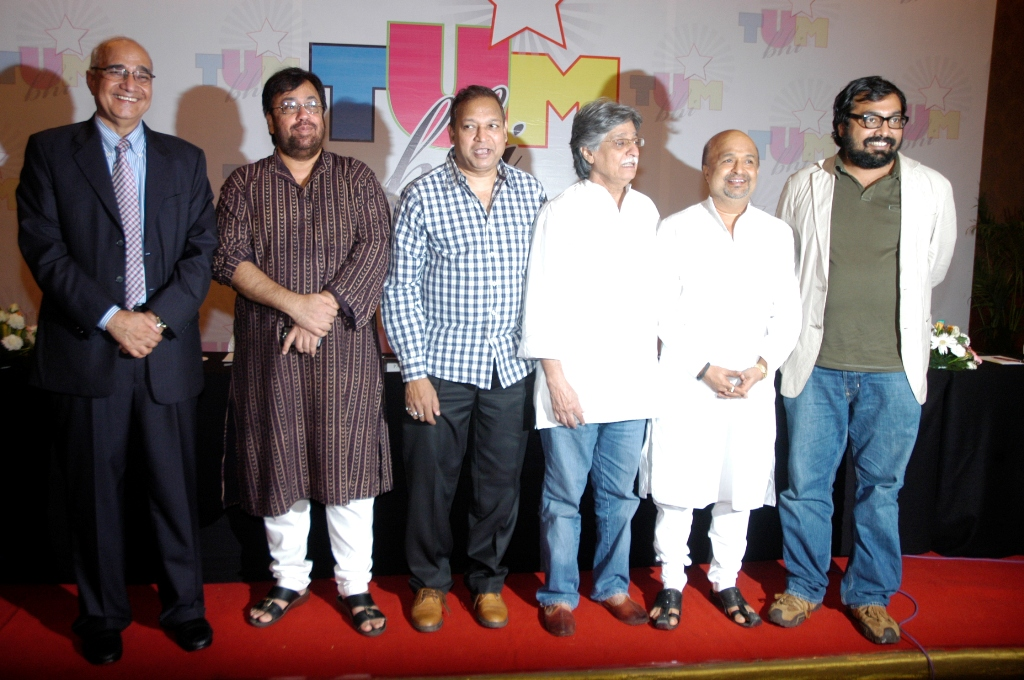
- Area served: Worldwide
- Owner: Nihilent
- Key people: LC Singh
- Registration: Free Registration
- Launched: August 2010

Tumbhi (Meaning in English: "You too") was an online community for artists and art lovers. Tumbhi provided a platform to discover, nurture and leverage talent.

== Origin ==
Brainchild of Mr LC Singh, Tumbhi was launched on 31 August 2010 by Anurag Kashyap, Pankuj Parashar, Kalki, Javed Siddiqui, Sameer, Om Katare, Nirav Shah, Uday Singh and Neeraj Roy. Well-known personalities like Irshad Kamil have joined hands with Tumbhi. Apart from a main website for 8 art categories, Tumbhi offers separate websites for Photographers , Writers and Short Films.

In February 2013, Tumbhi launched Ehsaas, an eBook of love poems and sketches. The love poems and sketches in the book are contributed by the Tumbhi artist community.

On 12 July 2013, Tumbhi, along with AKFPL launched SHORTS through PVR Director's Rare. SHORTS is an anthology of 5 accolade winning films starring Huma Qureshi, Nawazuddin Siddiqui, Richa Chadda, Vineet Singh. The film was well appreciated by medias like FirstPost, Mid-Day and more.

In August 2013, Tumbhi conducted a series of Photography Workshops with Vincent Versace, a well-known Natural Light Photographer and Nikon Ambassador for USA.
