= Sunjoy Monga =

Indian conservationist and photographer (1961/1962–2025)

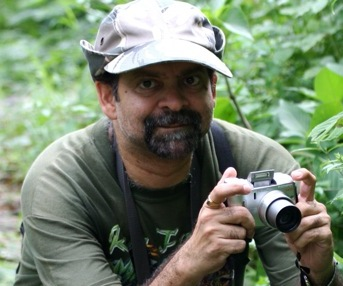
- Sunjoy Monga in the field
- Born: 1961 or 1962
- Died: 28 May 2025 (aged 63); Mumbai, India
- Occupations: Wildlife photographer; Naturalist; Conservationist; Writer; Columnist
- Notable work: Birds of Mumbai.; City Forest: Mumbai’s National Park; India Series: Wildlife Reserves of India; Mumbai Safari: Nature in the Extreme
- Children: Yuhina Monga (daughter)

Sunjoy Monga (1961 or 1962 – 28 May 2025) was an Indian wildlife photographer, conservationist, naturalist and writer based in Mumbai.

== Life and career ==
Monga was born in Masjid Bunder.

Monga led nature trail walks for the BNHS in the early 1990s, and also served as associate editor of the conservation magazine Sanctuary Asia between 1990-94.

Monga conceived in 2005, and co-managed until his death, the India BirdRaces, an annual initiative now renamed WINGS. The program brings together bird-watchers on a designated day to record sightings, particularly in urban regions, over the course of the day.

Monga served as a member of the Bombay Natural History Society governing council, the executive committee of the Mumbai Metropolitan Region Environment Improvement Society and the Maharashtra Nature Park Society. He was also an honorary Warden of the Sanjay Gandhi National Park.

Monga initiated an environmental awareness drive 'Young Rangers' in 2007 amongst schools and school children across India. He was chosen to be on the Tumbhi advisory panel.

Monga died on 28 May 2025, at the age of 63.

== Bibliography ==
- City Forest ISBN 9788175082977
- Wildlife Reserves of India ISBN 9788175083257
- The Mumbai Nature Guide ISBN 9788175083592
- Birds of Mumbai ISBN 9788175083912
- Journeys Through India's Last Wild Places ISBN 9788192250908
- Mumbai Safari ISBN 9788192250984
- Birds of the Mumbai Region ISBN 9788192250991
