= Cisano sul Neva =

- Comune
- Comune di Cisano sul Neva
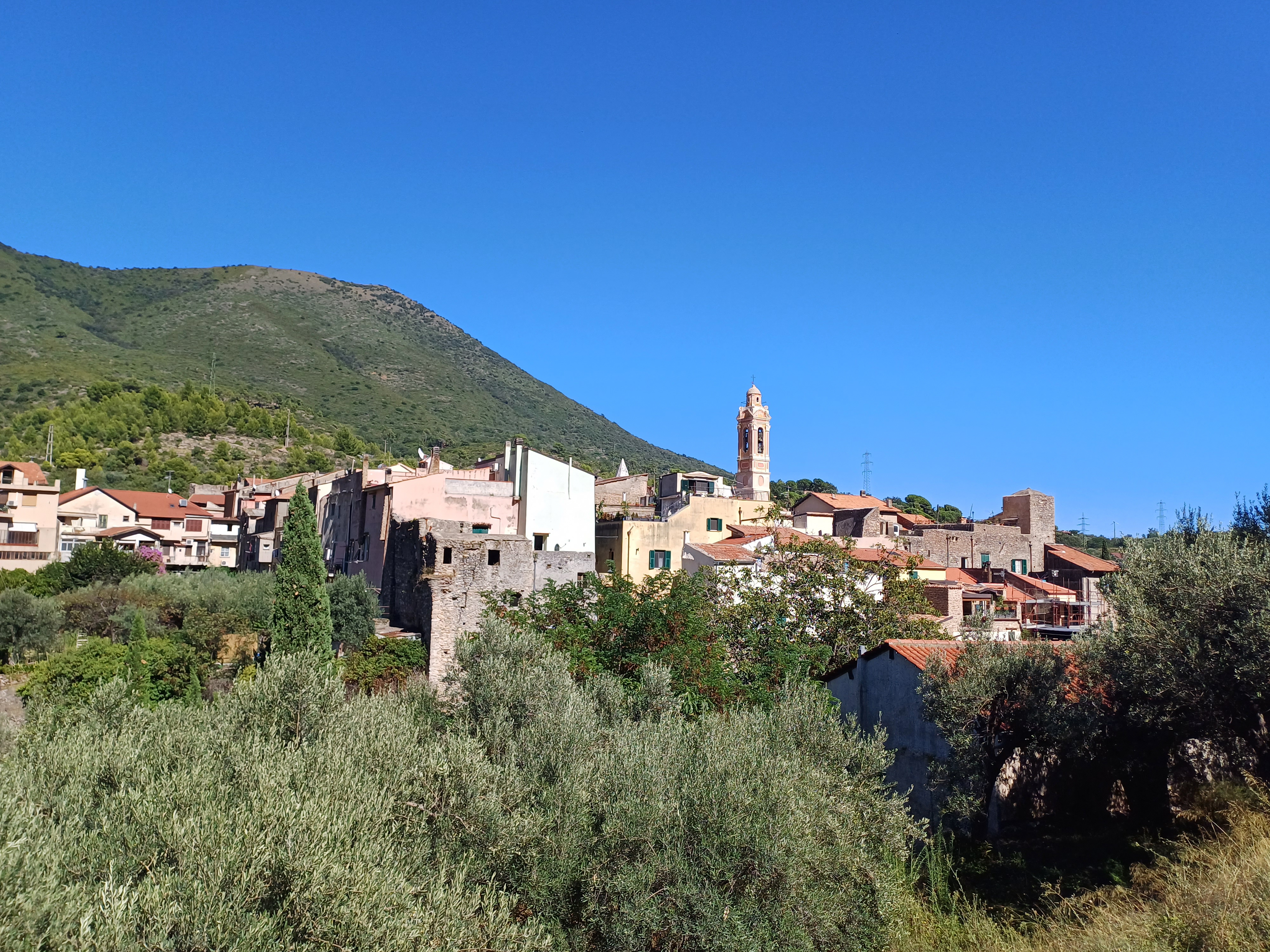
- View of the historic centre

- Coat of arms

- Location within Italy Location within Liguria
- Coordinates: 44°5′N 8°9′E
- Country: Italy
- Region: Liguria
- Province: Savona (SV)
- Frazioni: Cenesi, Conscente

Government
  - Mayor: Massimo Niero (since 2019)

Area
  - Total: 12.1 km^{2} (4.7 sq mi)
- Elevation: 52 m (171 ft)

Population (2024)
  - Total: 2,123
  - Density: 175/km^{2} (454/sq mi)
- Demonym: Cisanesi
- Time zone: UTC+1 (CET)
  - Summer (DST): UTC+2 (CEST)
- Postal code: 17035
- Dialing code: 0182
- Patron saint: St. Mary Magdalene
- Saint day: July 22

Cisano sul Neva (Ligurian: Cixan) is a comune (municipality) in the Province of Savona in the Italian region Liguria, located about 70 kilometres (43 mi) southwest of Genoa and about 35 kilometres (22 mi) southwest of Savona.

Located in the Val Neva, the territory of Cisano sul Neva borders those of the municipalities of Albenga, Arnasco, Balestrino, Ceriale and Zuccarello.

== Etymology ==
The comune gets its name from the Neva, a stram flowing down from the Ligurian Alps and crossing its territory.

== History ==
The town was part of the Marca Aleramica in the 10th century, and in 1091 it became a possession of Boniface del Vasto. Later it was under the Clavesana family, and in 1274 it was acquired by the commune of Albenga, which fortified it. Subsequently, it was part of the Republic of Genoa.

In the 17th century it was occupied by Savoy soldiers. In 1794–95 Cisano was the seat of fightings between Austrian and French troops. In 1815 it was annexed to the Kingdom of Sardinia, becoming part of unified Italy in 1861. The current denomination dates from 1863.

== Main sights ==
- Parish church of Santa Maria Maddalena (17th century).
- Romanesque church of San Calogero (11th century).
- The Castle of the Rolandi Ricci del Carretto in the frazione of Conscente (15th century).
- The so-called Saracen Tower, also outside the city, on the road towards Albenga. It is a Roman funerary monument dating around the 2nd century AD.

== Transport ==
Cisano is connected to Albenga and Garessio by the Provincial Road 582. It has also a railways station on the Albenga-Ventimiglia line.

== Twin towns ==
- Bigastro, Spain, since 2002
- Le Vigan, France, since 2002

== People ==
- Alessandra Mele, music artist, participant in Eurovision Song Contest 2023 for Norway
