= Monda River =

Coordinates: 15°32′N 86°15′W

Monda River (Spanish: Río Monda), also Monga River (Río Monga) and Manga River (Río Manga) is a river in the area of Sabá, Colón Department, Honduras.
