= Argentina (river) =

River in Italy

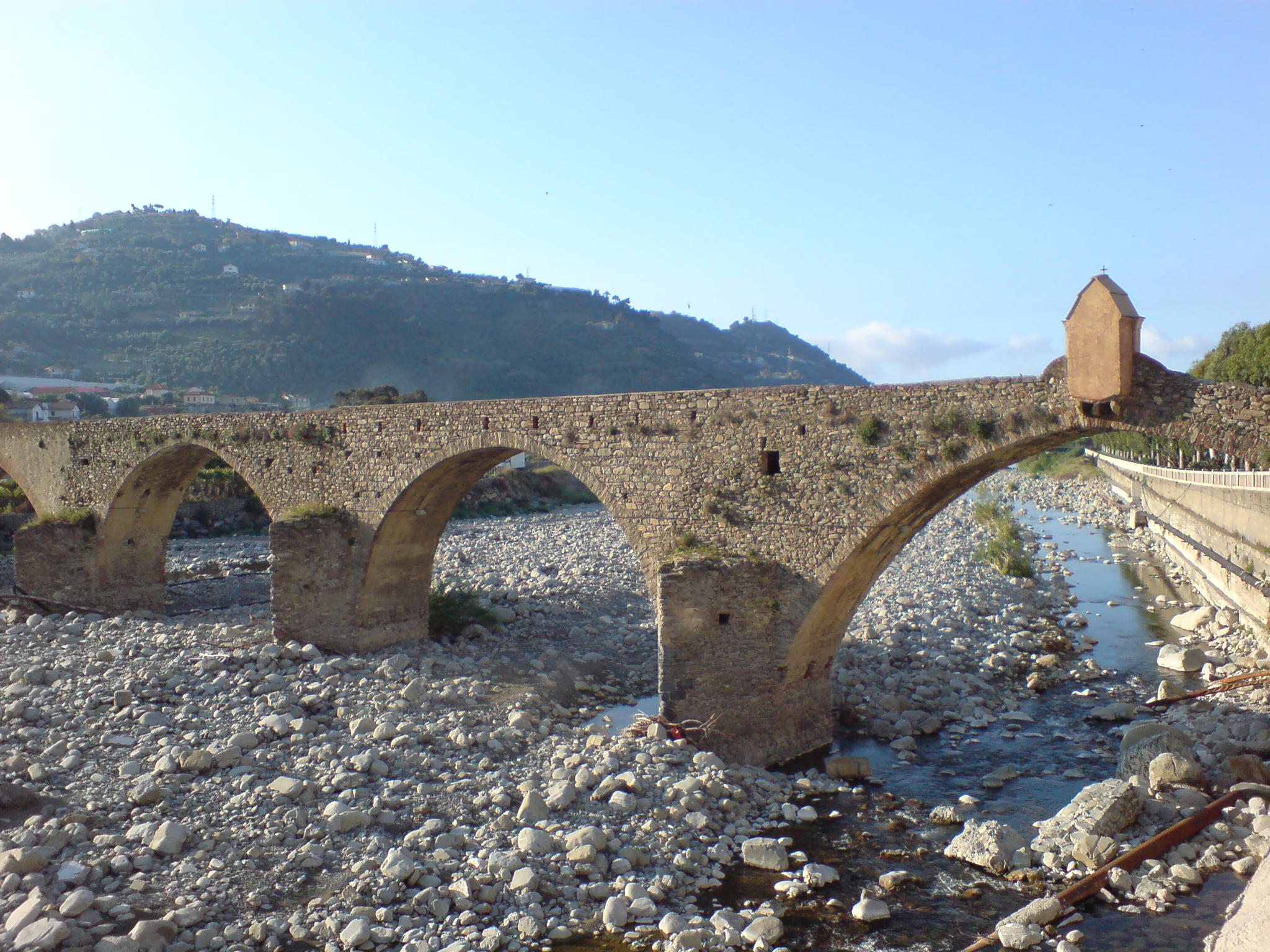
- The so called Roman bridge on the Argentina

Location
- Country: Italy

Physical characteristics
- Mouth
  - location: Ligurian Sea
  - coordinates: 43.8313°N 7.8598°E
- Length: 39.2 km (24.4 mi)
- Basin size: 207 km^{2} (80 sq mi)
- Discharge
  - average: 4.77 m^{3}/s (168 cu ft/s)

The Argentina is an Italian river in the province of Imperia.

== Geography ==
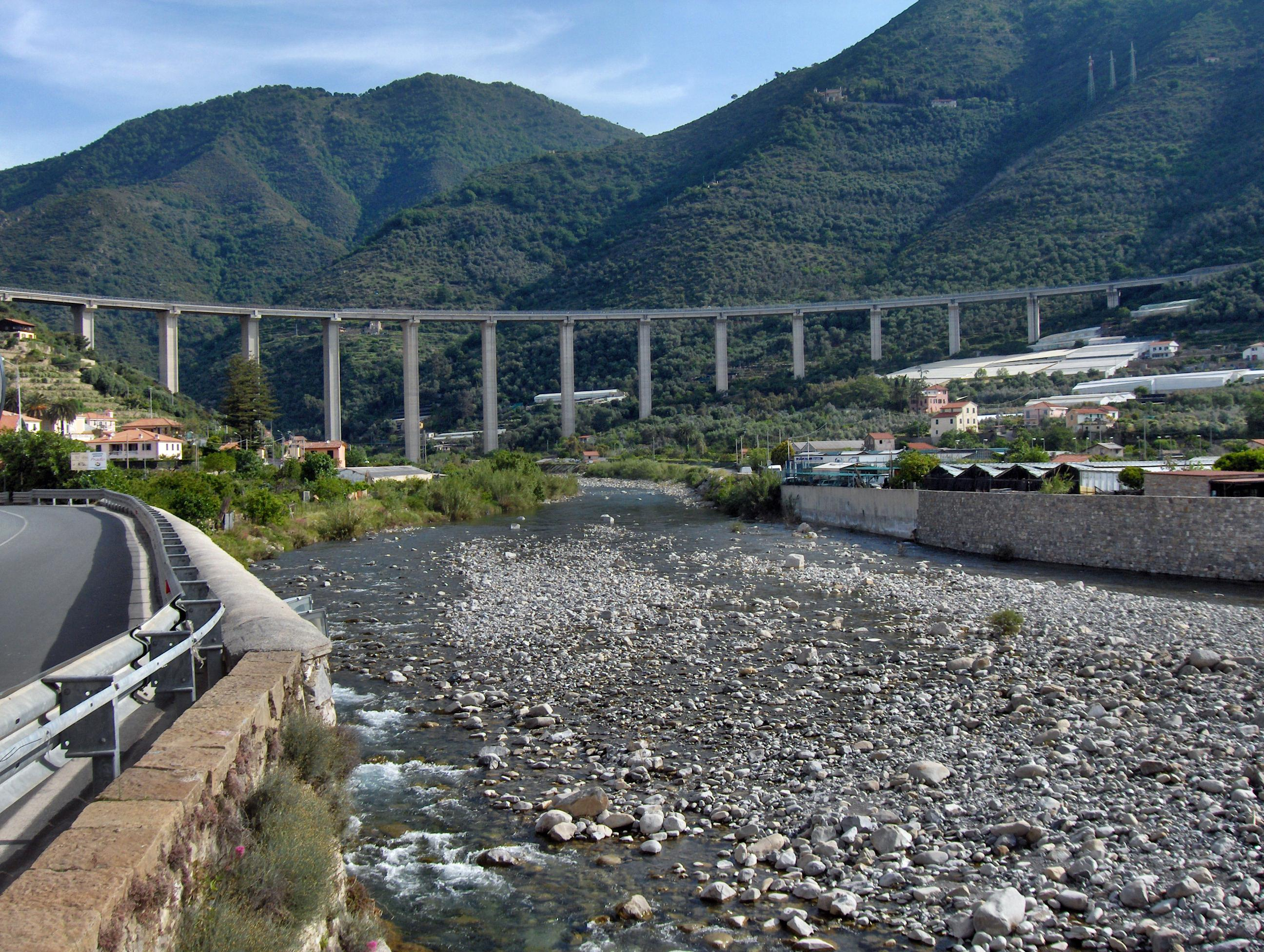
Motorway bridge on the Argentina

Its source is near the French border. The river flows past Triora and flows south before emptying into the Ligurian Sea, near Arma di Taggia.

== See also ==
- List of rivers of Italy
