= Arroscia =

River in Italy

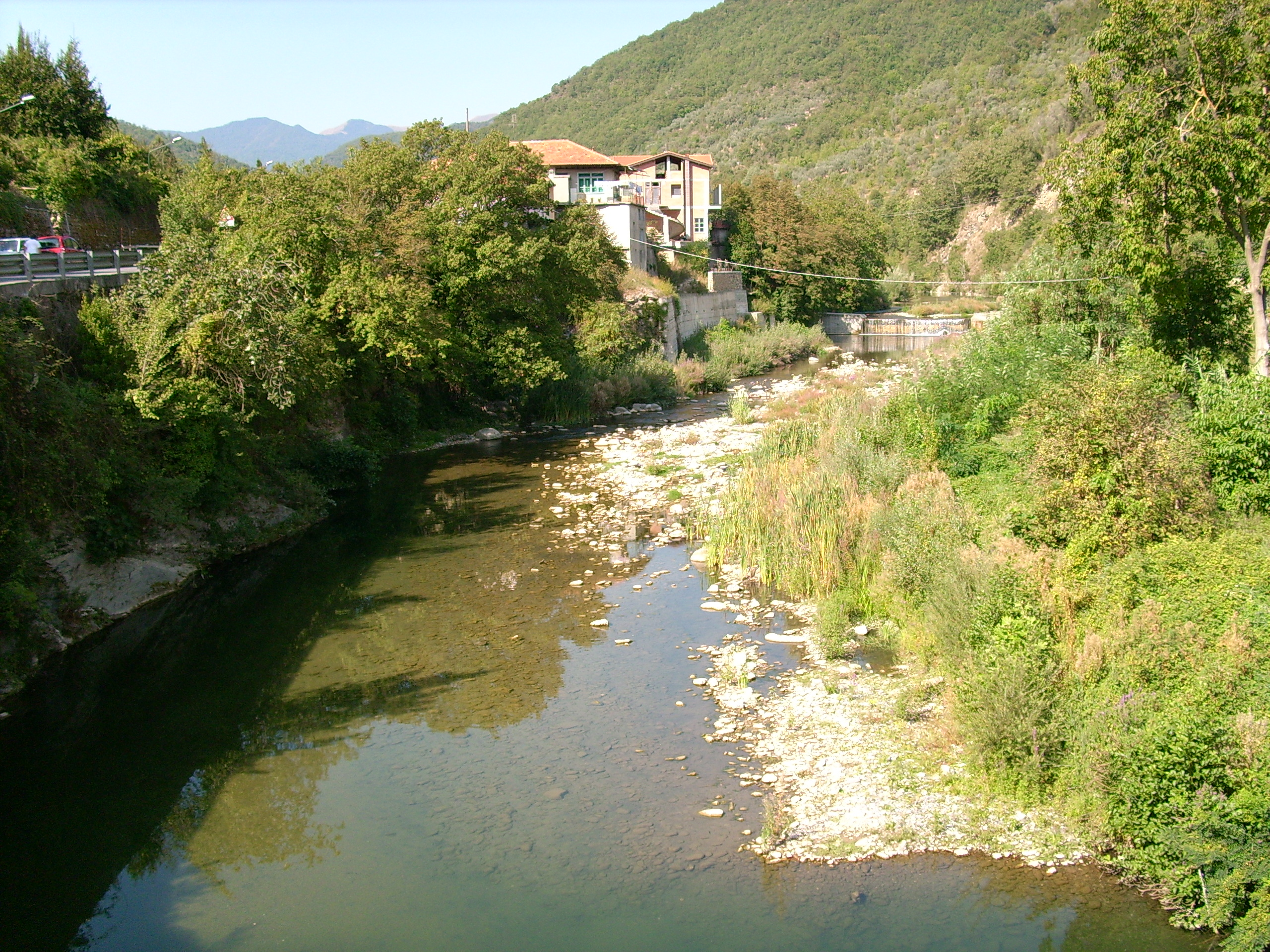

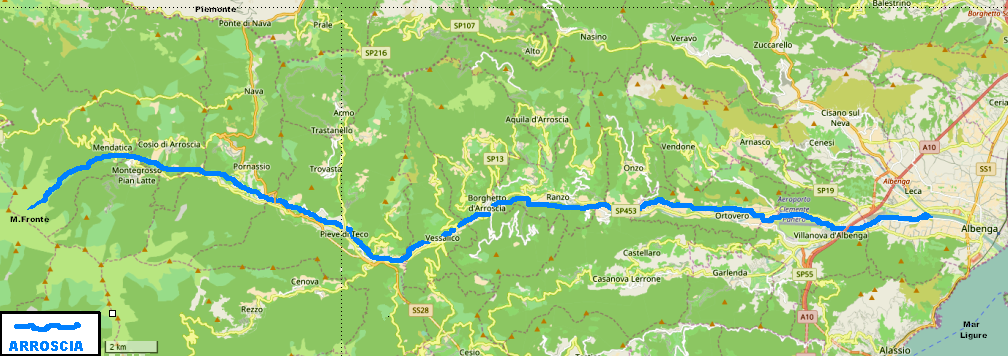

Location
- Country: Italy

Physical characteristics
- Source
  - location: near Mendatica
- Mouth: Centa
  - coordinates: 44°03′13″N 8°11′15″E
  - elevation: 5 m (16 ft)
- Length: 36.5
- Basin size: 289 km^{2} (112 mi^{2})
- Discharge
  - average: 4.02 m^{3}/s (142 cu ft/s)

Basin features
- Progression: Centa→ Ligurian Sea

The Arroscia is an Italian river in the provinces of Imperia. and Savona.

== Geography ==
The river rises from monte Frontè, in the comune of Mendatica, not far from the French border. The Arroscia flows east and receives several tributaries. It then joins the Neva and forms with it the Centa, one of the most relevant rivers of western Liguria. The Arroscia has a basin of 289 km^{2} (112 mi^{2}).

=== Main tributaries ===
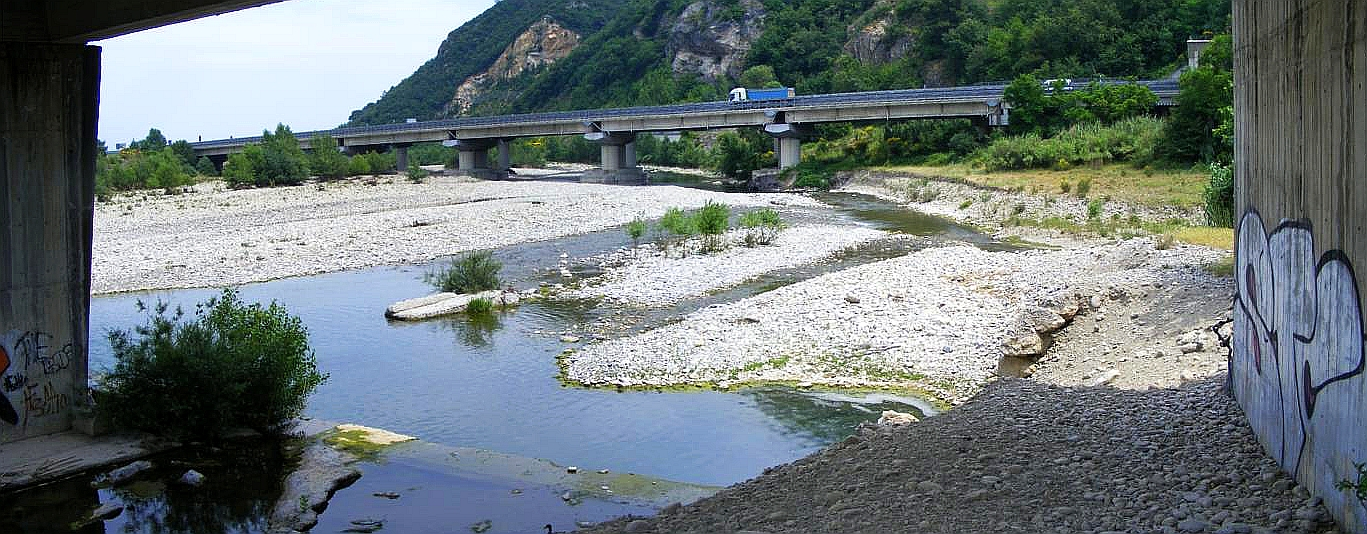
Lerrone confluence, with the A10 motorway in the background

- Right hand:
  - rio Ponte,
  - rio Ravinasso,
  - rio Rocchino,
  - torrente Giara di Rezzo,
  - rio Bottasso,
  - rio Ubaga.
  - torrente Lerrone.
- Left hand:
  - rio Gropin,
  - dei Laghi,
  - rio Brignola,
  - rio Teglia,
  - torrente Arogna,
  - rio Varasce,
  - rio Cornareo.
  - rio Parone,
  - rio Merco.

== See also ==
Media related to Arroscia at Wikimedia Commons

- List of rivers of Italy
