= Centa (river) =

Italian river

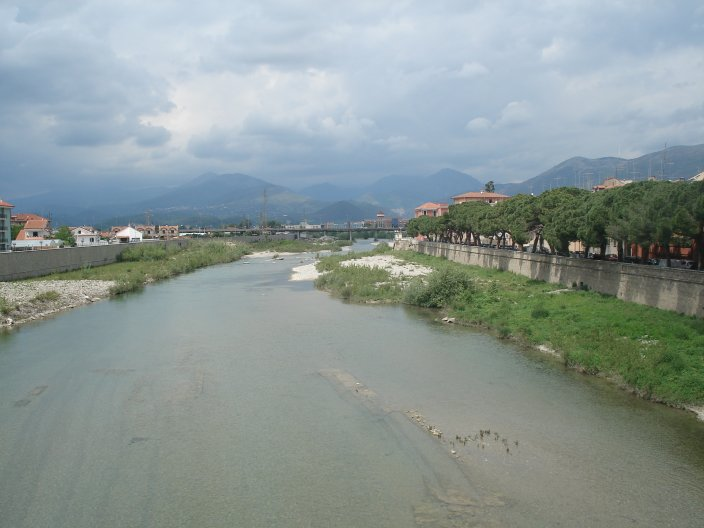
- Centa river in Albenga

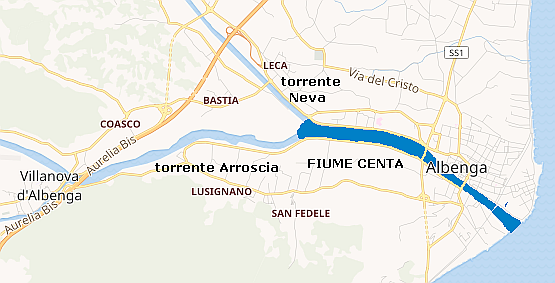

Location
- Country: Italy

Physical characteristics
- Source: confluence of Arroscia and Neva
  - location: Leca (Albenga)
  - elevation: 5 m (16 ft)
- Mouth: Ligurian Sea
  - location: near Albenga
  - coordinates: 44°02′31″N 8°13′17″E
  - elevation: 0 m (0 ft)
- Length: 3.2 km (2.0 mi)
- Basin size: 432 km^{2} (167 sq mi)

The Centa is a very short Italian river in the province of Savona.

== Geography ==
Its source is near the Italian village of Leca (Albenga), at the junction between Arroscia and Neva. The river flows south before emptying into the Ligurian Sea near Albenga.

== History ==
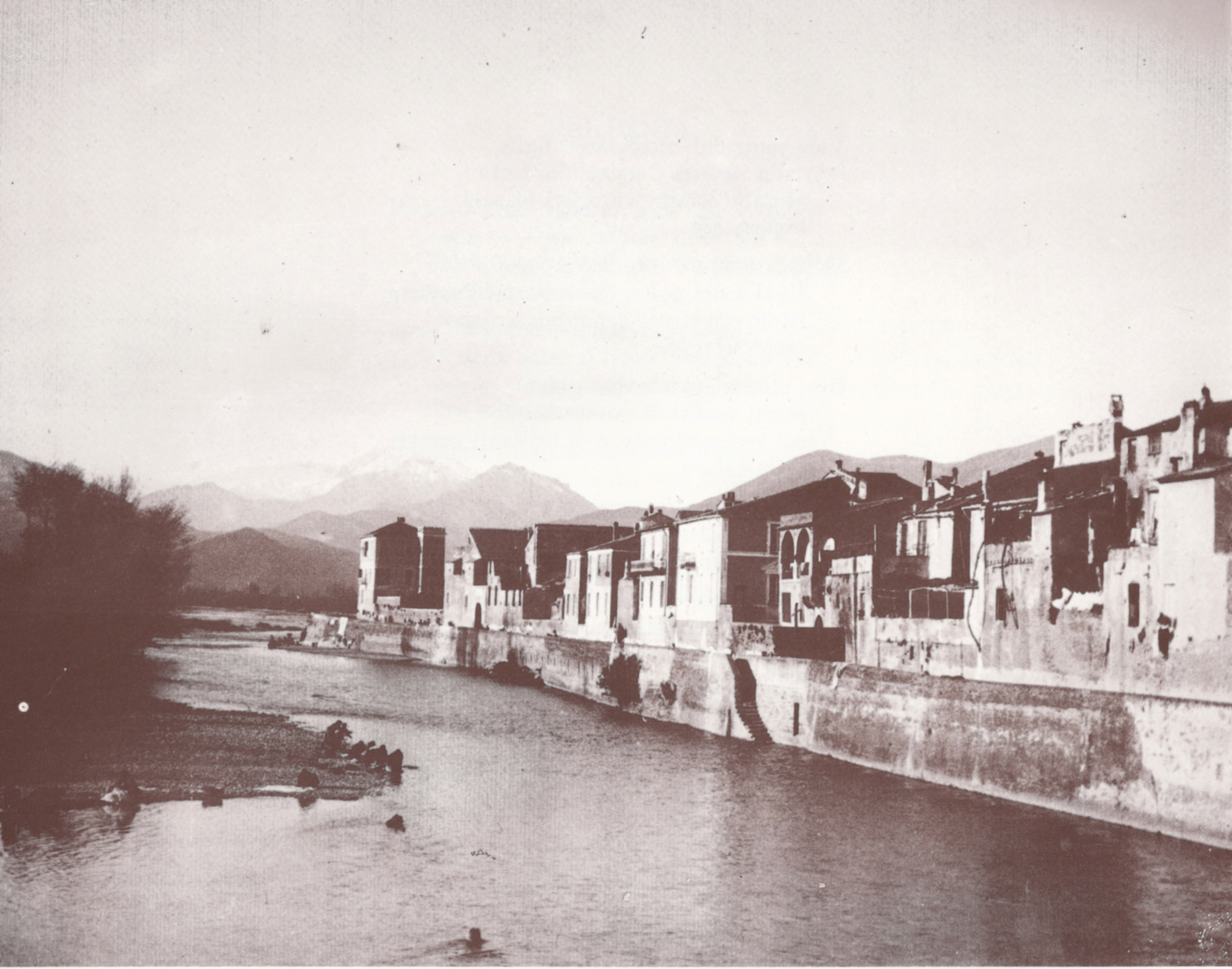
The Centa at the beginning of the 20th century

The river flowed up to the 12th century in a bed further east, joining the sea near Ceriale. Its course was diverted to the present bed following a decision of the Republic of Genoa. The name Centa comes from cinta (Italian for town wall), because the new flow flanked the town wall of Albenga. The old river bed became almost totally dry from the 16th century

== See also ==
- List of rivers of Italy
