= Vishal Monga =

Indian-American electrical engineer

- Occupations: Electrical engineer, researcher and academic

Academic background
- Education: B.Tech, Electronics and Communications Engineering; M.S., Electrical Engineering; Ph.D., Electrical Engineering
- Alma mater: University of Texas at Austin; Indian Institute of Technology Guwahati
- Thesis: Perceptually Based Methods for Robust Image Hashing (2005)

Academic work
- Institutions: Pennsylvania State University

Vishal Monga is an Indian-American electrical engineer and academic who is a professor of electrical engineering at Pennsylvania State University. He is known for his work in signal processing and computational imaging, particularly for developing optimization-based methods that integrate sparsity constraints, non-convex modeling, and interpretable deep learning techniques for imaging and sensing problems.

Monga’s research has contributed to advances in image analysis, medical imaging, radar, and sonar systems, with an emphasis on embedding physical models and domain knowledge into learning-based frameworks. He has played a prominent role in advancing algorithm-unrolling approaches that bridge iterative optimization and deep neural networks, improving robustness, interpretability, and performance in real-world imaging applications. He has published over 100 research papers and holds 45 patents. He is the author of the edited volume: Handbook of Convex Optimization Methods in Imaging Science.

Monga received the US National Science Foundation CAREER award in 2015 and the Ruth and Joel Spira Teaching Excellence Award in 2016. He is a Fellow of Institute of Electrical and Electronics Engineers (IEEE), Fellow of Asia-Pacific Artificial Intelligence Association (AAIA) and a 2022 inductee into the National Academy of Inventors.

== Education ==
Monga received a B.Tech. degree in Electronics and Communications Engineering from the Indian Institute of Technology Guwahati in 2001. He then moved to the United States, where he first received M.S. in Electrical Engineering in 2003 and then Ph.D. in Electrical Engineering in 2005, both from the University of Texas at Austin. His dissertation was entitled "Perceptually Based Methods for Robust Image Hashing."

== Career ==
While completing his Ph.D. at the University of Texas at Austin, Monga briefly worked as a Visiting Researcher at Microsoft Research. In 2006, he joined the Research Staff at Xerox Research Center Webster and worked there until 2009. At the same time, he also taught at the University of Rochester as an Adjunct Faculty. In 2009, he left Xerox Research and joined Pennsylvania State University where he was endowed the Monkowski Assistant Professor of Electrical Engineering. In 2015, he received tenure and promotion to the rank of associate professor of Electrical Engineering at Pennsylvania State University. In 2020, he was promoted to the rank of Professor. At the university, he also leads the Information Processing and Algorithms Laboratory.

Monga has been an Associate Editor of IEEE Transactions on Circuits and Systems for Video Technology since 2015 and a Senior Area Editor of IEEE Signal Processing Letters since 2019. He was an Associate Editor of IEEE Transactions on Image Processing from 2009 to 2019, of Journal of Electronic Imaging from 2009 to 2015 and of IEEE Signal Processing Letters from 2015 to 2019.

From 2017 to 2019, Monga was an elected member of IEEE Signal Processing Society, Image, Video and Multidimensional Signal Processing Technical Committee. In 2019, he was appointed the Lead Guest Editor of IEEE Journal of Selected Topics in Signal Processing: Special Issue on Domain Enriched Learning for Medical Imaging.

Starting January 2022, Monga has been an elected member of the IEEE Signal Processing Society, Computational Imaging Technical Committee, the Bio-Imaging and Signal Processing Technical Committee and the Sensor, Array and Multichannel Signal Processing Technical Committee.

=== Research ===
Monga's research contributions are in optimization-based methods for computational imaging, image analysis and radar signal processing. Research results from his group have advanced the state of the art for many significant open problems in imaging and vision, and radar systems including image and video hashing, medical image analysis for early detection of diseases and waveform design and estimation problems for modern radar systems.

Monga's research has been recognized via the US National Science Foundation CAREER award.

== Awards and honors ==
In 2025, Monga was elected a Fellow of the Institute of Electrical and Electronics Engineers (IEEE) and a Fellow of the Asia-Pacific Artificial Intelligence Association (AAIA). He was elected to the IEEE AI Coalition in 2024 and inducted as a Senior Member of the National Academy of Inventors in 2022.

He has received the Penn State Engineering Alumni Society (PSEAS) Premier Research Award (2022) and the PSEAS Outstanding Research Award (2019). His work has also been recognized with the National Science Foundation CAREER Award (2015), the IEEE Mikio Takagi Best Paper Award (2012), and multiple best paper honors at IEEE conferences, including the IEEE Radar Conference and IEEE Multimedia Signal Processing Workshop.

Monga has been honored for excellence in teaching with the Joel and Ruth Spira Excellence in Teaching Award (2016) and earlier received the Monkowski Career Development Professorship at Penn State. Additional distinctions include the Young Engineer of the Year Award from the Rochester Engineering Society and competitive research fellowships from the U.S. Air Force Research Laboratory and other organizations.

== Selected publications ==
=== Articles ===
- V. Monga, Y. Li and Y. Eldar, Algorithm Unrolling: Interpretable, Efficient Deep Learning for Signal and Image Processing, IEEE Signal Processing Magazine, volume 38, issue 2, March 2021.

=== Books ===
- Handbook of Convex Optimization Methods in Imaging Science (2018)

=== Book chapters ===
- "Color Image Halftoning" in Color Image Processing: Methods and Applications (2006)
- "Video Anomaly Detection" in Computer Vision and Imaging in Intelligent Transportation Systems (2016)
