= Monte Galero =

Mountain in Italy

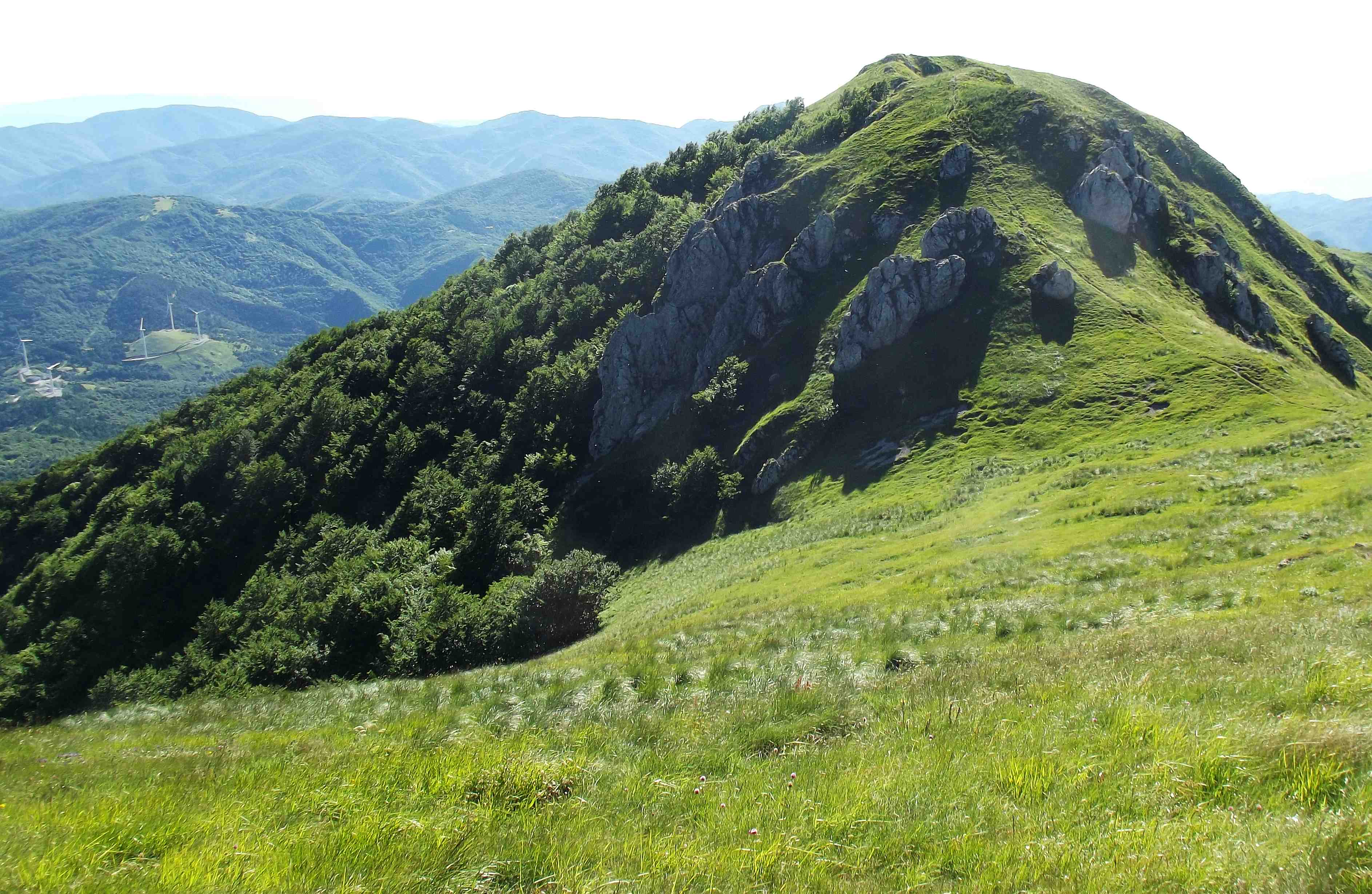

Highest point
- Elevation: 1,708 m (5,604 ft)
- Prominence: 395 m (1,296 ft)
- Isolation: 5.97 km (3.71 mi)
- Coordinates: 44°09′22″N 8°00′55″E

Geography
- Location within Alps
- Location: Liguria / Piedmont, Italy
- Parent range: Ligurian Alps

Monte Galero is a mountain in Liguria, northern Italy, part of the Alps. It is located in the provinces of Savona and Cuneo. It lies at an altitude of 1708 metres and, after Monte Armetta, is the second highest summit of the Ligurian Prealps.

== SOIUSA classification ==
According to the SOIUSA (International Standardized Mountain Subdivision of the Alps) the mountain can be classified in the following way:

- main part = Western Alps
- major sector = South Western Alps
- section = Ligurian Alps
- subsection = Prealpi Liguri
- supergroup = Catena Settepani-Carmo-Armetta
- group = Gruppo Galero-Armetta
- subgroup = Costiera Galero-Armetta
- code = I/A-1.I-A.3.a

== Hiking ==
The mountain is accessible by off-road mountain paths and is crossed by the Alta Via dei Monti Liguri, a long-distance trail from Ventimiglia (province of Imperia) to Bolano (province of La Spezia).

== Nature conservation ==
The mountain and its surrounding area are part of a SIC (Site of Community Importance) called Monte Galero (code: IT1323920).
