= Rezzo =

Rezzo Ressu
- Comune
- Comune di Rezzo
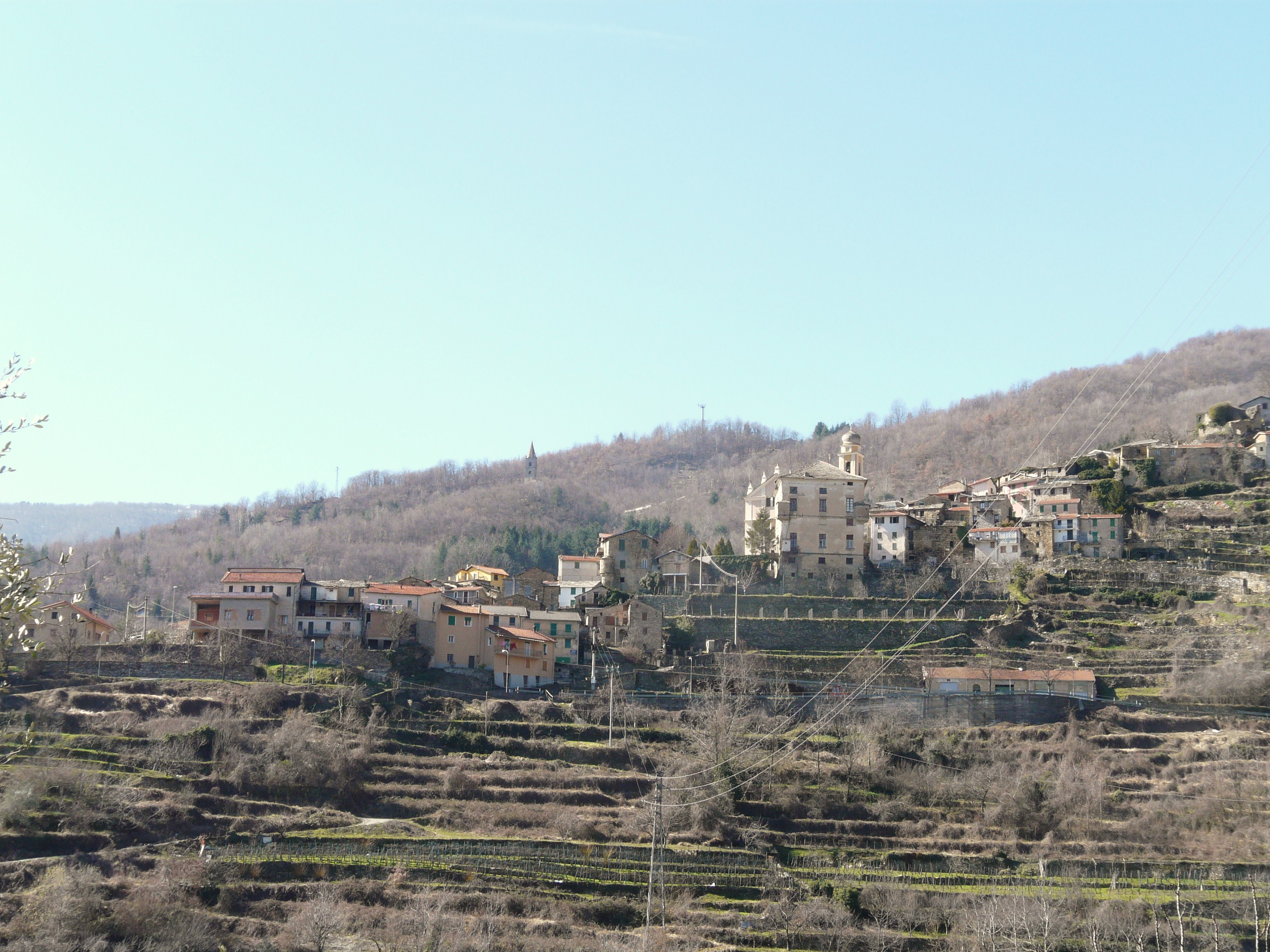
- View of Rezzo

- Location within Italy Location within Liguria
- Coordinates: 44°1′N 7°52′E
- Country: Italy
- Region: Liguria
- Province: Province of Imperia (IM)
- Frazioni: Lavina, Cenova

Area
  - Total: 37.4 km^{2} (14.4 sq mi)

Population (Dec. 2004)
  - Total: 390
  - Density: 10/km^{2} (27/sq mi)
- Time zone: UTC+1 (CET)
  - Summer (DST): UTC+2 (CEST)
- Postal code: 18020
- Dialing code: 0183

Rezzo (Ligurian: Ressu) is a comune (municipality) in the Province of Imperia in the Italian region Liguria, located about 100 kilometres (62 mi) southwest of Genoa and about 20 kilometres (12 mi) northwest of Imperia.

== Geography ==
As of 31 December 2004, Rezzo had a population of 390 and an area of 37.4 square kilometres (14.4 mi^{2}).

Rezzo borders the following municipalities: Aurigo, Borgomaro, Carpasio, Molini di Triora, Montegrosso Pian Latte, Pieve di Teco, and Pornassio.

== History ==
In 1928 the Fascist regime, bent on creating wider Comuni, unified Rezzo with two smaller neighbouring townships, Cenova and Lavina, thus unifying at administrative level the valley of the Giara di Rezzo.

== Demographic evolution ==
Historical population

Year	Pop.	±%
1861	1,922	—
1871	1,999	+4.0%
1881	1,943	−2.8%
1901	1,786	−8.1%
1911	1,794	+0.4%

Year	Pop.	±%
1921	1,636	−8.8%
1931	1,373	−16.1%
1936	1,286	−6.3%
1951	1,116	−13.2%
1961	816	−26.9%

Year	Pop.	±%
1971	706	−13.5%
1981	559	−20.8%
1991	461	−17.5%
2001	393	−14.8%

Source: Data from ISTAT

== See also ==
- Giara di Rezzo
- Parco naturale regionale delle Alpi Liguri
