= List of municipalities of the Province of Imperia =

The following is a list of the 66 municipalities (comuni) of the Province of Imperia in the region of Liguria in Italy.

== List ==
Municipality	Population (2026)	Area (km²)	Density
Airole	371	14.63	25.4
Apricale	585	19.94	29.3
Aquila d'Arroscia	144	10.06	14.3
Armo	121	10.09	12.0
Aurigo	336	9.14	36.8
Badalucco	1,065	16.10	66.1
Bajardo	352	24.32	14.5
Bordighera	10,366	10.65	973.3
Borghetto d'Arroscia	389	25.94	15.0
Borgomaro	823	23.44	35.1
Camporosso	5,788	17.94	322.6
Caravonica	257	4.47	57.5
Castel Vittorio	237	25.93	9.1
Castellaro	1,209	7.86	153.8
Ceriana	1,098	31.79	34.5
Cervo	1,079	3.59	300.6
Cesio	247	8.86	27.9
Chiusanico	594	13.51	44.0
Chiusavecchia	533	4.09	130.3
Cipressa	1,192	9.39	126.9
Civezza	630	3.88	162.4
Cosio d'Arroscia	168	40.56	4.1
Costarainera	767	2.52	304.4
Diano Arentino	669	8.33	80.3
Diano Castello	2,270	6.11	371.5
Diano Marina	5,475	6.67	820.8
Diano San Pietro	1,105	11.91	92.8
Dolceacqua	2,216	20.28	109.3
Dolcedo	1,264	19.80	63.8
Imperia	42,594	45.38	938.6
Isolabona	689	12.35	55.8
Lucinasco	294	7.90	37.2
Mendatica	161	30.69	5.2
Molini di Triora	583	58.05	10.0
Montalto Carpasio	478	30.00	15.9
Montegrosso Pian Latte	109	10.03	10.9
Olivetta San Michele	190	13.84	13.7
Ospedaletti	3,204	5.45	587.9
Perinaldo	775	20.30	38.2
Pietrabruna	403	10.22	39.4
Pieve di Teco	1,329	40.51	32.8
Pigna	742	53.23	13.9
Pompeiana	849	5.38	157.8
Pontedassio	2,383	13.31	179.0
Pornassio	682	27.21	25.1
Prelà	497	14.80	33.6
Ranzo	576	10.86	53.0
Rezzo	311	37.37	8.3
Riva Ligure	2,711	2.07	1,309.7
Rocchetta Nervina	267	15.29	17.5
San Bartolomeo al Mare	2,967	10.85	273.5
San Biagio della Cima	1,283	4.31	297.7
San Lorenzo al Mare	1,224	1.29	948.8
Sanremo	53,157	55.96	949.9
Santo Stefano al Mare	1,984	2.69	737.5
Seborga	286	4.87	58.7
Soldano	967	3.47	278.7
Taggia	13,958	31.36	445.1
Terzorio	214	1.93	110.9
Triora	419	67.61	6.2
Vallebona	1,240	5.88	210.9
Vallecrosia	6,816	3.68	1,852.2
Vasia	355	11.15	31.8
Ventimiglia	23,083	53.73	429.6
Vessalico	279	10.46	26.7
Villa Faraldi	439	9.52	46.1

== See also ==
- List of municipalities of Liguria
- List of municipalities of Italy
- Province of Imperia topics
