= List of municipalities of Liguria =

Location of Liguria within Italy

Provinces of Liguria

The following is a list of the municipalities (comuni) of the region of Liguria in Italy.

There are 234 municipalities in Liguria as of 2026:

- 67 in the Metropolitan City of Genoa
- 66 in the Province of Imperia
- 32 in the Province of La Spezia
- 69 in the Province of Savona

== List ==
Municipality	Province	Population (2026)	Area (km²)	Density
Airole	Imperia	371	14.63	25.4
Alassio	Savona	9,905	17.25	574.2
Albenga	Savona	23,670	36.58	647.1
Albisola Superiore	Savona	9,471	28.68	330.2
Albissola Marina	Savona	5,125	3.25	1,576.9
Altare	Savona	1,922	11.30	170.1
Ameglia	La Spezia	4,270	14.17	301.3
Andora	Savona	7,255	31.80	228.1
Apricale	Imperia	585	19.94	29.3
Aquila d'Arroscia	Imperia	144	10.06	14.3
Arcola	La Spezia	10,229	16.54	618.4
Arenzano	Genoa	11,134	24.30	458.2
Armo	Imperia	121	10.09	12.0
Arnasco	Savona	529	6.09	86.9
Aurigo	Imperia	336	9.14	36.8
Avegno	Genoa	2,533	10.93	231.7
Badalucco	Imperia	1,065	16.10	66.1
Bajardo	Imperia	352	24.32	14.5
Balestrino	Savona	522	11.27	46.3
Bardineto	Savona	764	29.79	25.6
Bargagli	Genoa	2,478	16.28	152.2
Bergeggi	Savona	1,033	3.69	279.9
Beverino	La Spezia	2,284	34.95	65.4
Bogliasco	Genoa	4,249	4.42	961.3
Boissano	Savona	2,584	8.35	309.5
Bolano	La Spezia	7,456	14.57	511.7
Bonassola	La Spezia	761	9.19	82.8
Bordighera	Imperia	10,366	10.65	973.3
Borghetto d'Arroscia	Imperia	389	25.94	15.0
Borghetto di Vara	La Spezia	928	27.34	33.9
Borghetto Santo Spirito	Savona	4,549	5.39	844.0
Borgio Verezzi	Savona	2,081	2.73	762.3
Borgomaro	Imperia	823	23.44	35.1
Bormida	Savona	306	22.47	13.6
Borzonasca	Genoa	1,831	80.51	22.7
Brugnato	La Spezia	1,291	11.90	108.5
Busalla	Genoa	5,110	17.06	299.5
Cairo Montenotte	Savona	12,960	100.40	129.1
Calice al Cornoviglio	La Spezia	1,023	33.75	30.3
Calice Ligure	Savona	1,674	20.60	81.3
Calizzano	Savona	1,457	62.74	23.2
Camogli	Genoa	4,798	10.07	476.5
Campo Ligure	Genoa	2,821	23.74	118.8
Campomorone	Genoa	6,432	25.91	248.2
Camporosso	Imperia	5,788	17.94	322.6
Carasco	Genoa	3,707	8.46	438.2
Caravonica	Imperia	257	4.47	57.5
Carcare	Savona	5,209	10.40	500.9
Carro	La Spezia	489	31.79	15.4
Carrodano	La Spezia	459	21.86	21.0
Casanova Lerrone	Savona	738	24.23	30.5
Casarza Ligure	Genoa	6,729	27.82	241.9
Casella	Genoa	3,049	8.07	377.8
Castel Vittorio	Imperia	237	25.93	9.1
Castelbianco	Savona	319	14.70	21.7
Castellaro	Imperia	1,209	7.86	153.8
Castelnuovo Magra	La Spezia	8,236	15.02	548.3
Castelvecchio di Rocca Barbena	Savona	133	16.14	8.2
Castiglione Chiavarese	Genoa	1,531	29.75	51.5
Celle Ligure	Savona	4,825	9.56	504.7
Cengio	Savona	3,505	18.96	184.9
Ceranesi	Genoa	3,584	30.70	116.7
Ceriale	Savona	5,401	11.15	484.4
Ceriana	Imperia	1,098	31.79	34.5
Cervo	Imperia	1,079	3.59	300.6
Cesio	Imperia	247	8.86	27.9
Chiavari	Genoa	27,435	12.23	2,243.3
Chiusanico	Imperia	594	13.51	44.0
Chiusavecchia	Imperia	533	4.09	130.3
Cicagna	Genoa	2,339	11.28	207.4
Cipressa	Imperia	1,192	9.39	126.9
Cisano sul Neva	Savona	2,132	12.27	173.8
Civezza	Imperia	630	3.88	162.4
Cogoleto	Genoa	8,249	20.72	398.1
Cogorno	Genoa	5,692	9.08	626.9
Coreglia Ligure	Genoa	241	8.00	30.1
Cosio d'Arroscia	Imperia	168	40.56	4.1
Cosseria	Savona	1,029	12.41	82.9
Costarainera	Imperia	767	2.52	304.4
Crocefieschi	Genoa	546	11.73	46.5
Davagna	Genoa	1,772	20.53	86.3
Dego	Savona	1,826	66.82	27.3
Deiva Marina	La Spezia	1,276	14.09	90.6
Diano Arentino	Imperia	669	8.33	80.3
Diano Castello	Imperia	2,270	6.11	371.5
Diano Marina	Imperia	5,475	6.67	820.8
Diano San Pietro	Imperia	1,105	11.91	92.8
Dolceacqua	Imperia	2,216	20.28	109.3
Dolcedo	Imperia	1,264	19.80	63.8
Erli	Savona	245	16.73	14.6
Fascia	Genoa	65	11.25	5.8
Favale di Malvaro	Genoa	421	16.62	25.3
Finale Ligure	Savona	10,903	35.53	306.9
Follo	La Spezia	6,239	23.27	268.1
Fontanigorda	Genoa	226	16.16	14.0
Framura	La Spezia	567	19.26	29.4
Garlenda	Savona	1,397	8.03	174.0
Genoa	Genoa	566,247	240.29	2,356.5
Giustenice	Savona	992	17.22	57.6
Giusvalla	Savona	389	19.70	19.7
Gorreto	Genoa	84	18.88	4.4
Imperia	Imperia	42,594	45.38	938.6
Isola del Cantone	Genoa	1,425	47.97	29.7
Isolabona	Imperia	689	12.35	55.8
La Spezia	La Spezia	92,610	51.39	1,802.1
Laigueglia	Savona	1,681	2.72	618.0
Lavagna	Genoa	12,411	13.88	894.2
Leivi	Genoa	2,447	9.71	252.0
Lerici	La Spezia	9,143	16.01	571.1
Levanto	La Spezia	5,018	36.81	136.3
Loano	Savona	10,710	13.48	794.5
Lorsica	Genoa	377	17.72	21.3
Lucinasco	Imperia	294	7.90	37.2
Lumarzo	Genoa	1,437	25.51	56.3
Luni	La Spezia	8,099	13.86	584.3
Magliolo	Savona	992	19.57	50.7
Maissana	La Spezia	567	45.43	12.5
Mallare	Savona	1,017	31.73	32.1
Masone	Genoa	3,314	29.44	112.6
Massimino	Savona	102	7.85	13.0
Mele	Genoa	2,511	16.93	148.3
Mendatica	Imperia	161	30.69	5.2
Mezzanego	Genoa	1,563	28.65	54.6
Mignanego	Genoa	3,542	16.27	217.7
Millesimo	Savona	3,334	15.96	208.9
Mioglia	Savona	502	19.30	26.0
Moconesi	Genoa	2,423	16.27	148.9
Molini di Triora	Imperia	583	58.05	10.0
Moneglia	Genoa	2,490	15.61	159.5
Montalto Carpasio	Imperia	478	30.00	15.9
Montebruno	Genoa	199	17.68	11.3
Montegrosso Pian Latte	Imperia	109	10.03	10.9
Monterosso al Mare	La Spezia	1,289	10.94	117.8
Montoggio	Genoa	2,020	47.73	42.3
Murialdo	Savona	715	39.22	18.2
Nasino	Savona	145	22.18	6.5
Ne	Genoa	2,126	63.52	33.5
Neirone	Genoa	890	30.24	29.4
Noli	Savona	2,373	9.67	245.4
Olivetta San Michele	Imperia	190	13.84	13.7
Onzo	Savona	209	8.23	25.4
Orco Feglino	Savona	901	17.31	52.1
Orero	Genoa	504	15.99	31.5
Ortovero	Savona	1,689	9.66	174.8
Osiglia	Savona	401	28.17	14.2
Ospedaletti	Imperia	3,204	5.45	587.9
Pallare	Savona	867	21.33	40.6
Perinaldo	Imperia	775	20.30	38.2
Piana Crixia	Savona	749	30.45	24.6
Pietra Ligure	Savona	8,224	9.88	832.4
Pietrabruna	Imperia	403	10.22	39.4
Pieve di Teco	Imperia	1,329	40.51	32.8
Pieve Ligure	Genoa	2,352	3.56	660.7
Pigna	Imperia	742	53.23	13.9
Pignone	La Spezia	529	17.75	29.8
Plodio	Savona	616	8.65	71.2
Pompeiana	Imperia	849	5.38	157.8
Pontedassio	Imperia	2,383	13.31	179.0
Pontinvrea	Savona	807	24.95	32.3
Pornassio	Imperia	682	27.21	25.1
Portofino	Genoa	359	2.53	141.9
Portovenere	La Spezia	3,155	7.66	411.9
Prelà	Imperia	497	14.80	33.6
Propata	Genoa	119	16.93	7.0
Quiliano	Savona	6,818	49.92	136.6
Ranzo	Imperia	576	10.86	53.0
Rapallo	Genoa	29,595	33.61	880.5
Recco	Genoa	9,273	9.77	949.1
Rezzo	Imperia	311	37.37	8.3
Rezzoaglio	Genoa	859	104.72	8.2
Rialto	Savona	526	19.60	26.8
Riccò del Golfo di Spezia	La Spezia	3,643	37.76	96.5
Riomaggiore	La Spezia	1,260	10.27	122.7
Riva Ligure	Imperia	2,711	2.07	1,309.7
Roccavignale	Savona	755	17.71	42.6
Rocchetta di Vara	La Spezia	661	32.66	20.2
Rocchetta Nervina	Imperia	267	15.29	17.5
Ronco Scrivia	Genoa	4,213	30.11	139.9
Rondanina	Genoa	57	12.81	4.4
Rossiglione	Genoa	2,523	47.59	53.0
Rovegno	Genoa	469	44.09	10.6
San Bartolomeo al Mare	Imperia	2,967	10.85	273.5
San Biagio della Cima	Imperia	1,283	4.31	297.7
San Colombano Certenoli	Genoa	2,697	41.58	64.9
San Lorenzo al Mare	Imperia	1,224	1.29	948.8
Sanremo	Imperia	53,157	55.96	949.9
Sant'Olcese	Genoa	5,563	21.90	254.0
Santa Margherita Ligure	Genoa	8,259	10.04	822.6
Santo Stefano al Mare	Imperia	1,984	2.69	737.5
Santo Stefano d'Aveto	Genoa	964	54.78	17.6
Santo Stefano di Magra	La Spezia	10,004	13.85	722.3
Sarzana	La Spezia	21,726	34.52	629.4
Sassello	Savona	1,700	100.66	16.9
Savignone	Genoa	3,000	21.74	138.0
Savona	Savona	58,421	65.32	894.4
Seborga	Imperia	286	4.87	58.7
Serra Riccò	Genoa	7,573	26.20	289.0
Sesta Godano	La Spezia	1,263	67.78	18.6
Sestri Levante	Genoa	17,088	33.62	508.3
Soldano	Imperia	967	3.47	278.7
Sori	Genoa	3,893	13.07	297.9
Spotorno	Savona	3,314	8.02	413.2
Stella	Savona	2,945	43.68	67.4
Stellanello	Savona	806	17.81	45.3
Taggia	Imperia	13,958	31.36	445.1
Terzorio	Imperia	214	1.93	110.9
Testico	Savona	173	10.29	16.8
Tiglieto	Genoa	476	24.54	19.4
Toirano	Savona	2,724	18.97	143.6
Torriglia	Genoa	2,236	60.02	37.3
Tovo San Giacomo	Savona	2,507	9.45	265.3
Tribogna	Genoa	599	7.14	83.9
Triora	Imperia	419	67.61	6.2
Urbe	Savona	651	31.17	20.9
Uscio	Genoa	2,118	9.63	219.9
Vado Ligure	Savona	7,967	23.79	334.9
Valbrevenna	Genoa	754	34.67	21.7
Vallebona	Imperia	1,240	5.88	210.9
Vallecrosia	Imperia	6,816	3.68	1,852.2
Varazze	Savona	12,409	48.00	258.5
Varese Ligure	La Spezia	1,717	137.59	12.5
Vasia	Imperia	355	11.15	31.8
Vendone	Savona	343	9.92	34.6
Ventimiglia	Imperia	23,083	53.73	429.6
Vernazza	La Spezia	675	12.30	54.9
Vessalico	Imperia	279	10.46	26.7
Vezzano Ligure	La Spezia	7,214	18.37	392.7
Vezzi Portio	Savona	795	8.76	90.8
Villa Faraldi	Imperia	439	9.52	46.1
Villanova d'Albenga	Savona	2,888	15.89	181.7
Vobbia	Genoa	365	33.43	10.9
Zignago	La Spezia	458	28.70	16.0
Zoagli	Genoa	2,305	7.79	295.9
Zuccarello	Savona	284	10.81	26.3

== See also ==
- List of municipalities of Italy
