= Diocese of Ventimiglia-Sanremo =

Roman Catholic diocese in Liguria, Italy

Coordinates: 43.7911°N 7.6028°E

Diocese of Ventimiglia-Sanremo Dioecesis Ventimiliensis-Sancti Romuli Diocesi di Ventimiglia e Sanremo

Catholic
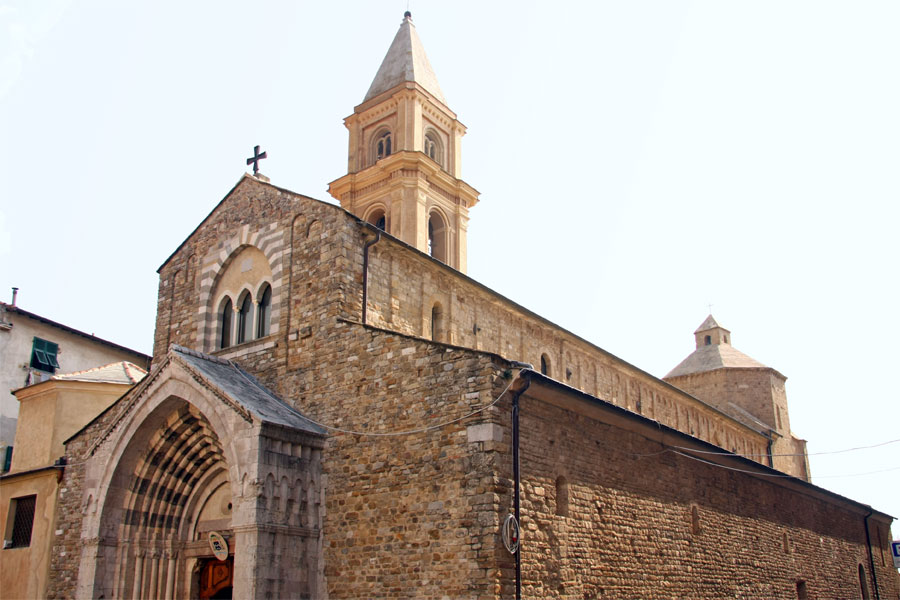
- Ventimiglia Cathedral

Location
- Country: Italy
- Ecclesiastical province: Genoa

Statistics
- Area: 715 km^{2} (276 sq mi)
- Population: Total; Catholics: (as of 2014); 158,000 (est.); 152,400 (est.) (96.5%)
- Parishes: 99

Information
- Denomination: Catholic Church
- Rite: Roman Rite
- Established: 7th Century
- Cathedral: Cattedrale di Nostra Signora Assunta (Ventimiglia)
- Co-cathedral: Basilica Concattedrale di S. Siro (Sanremo)
- Secular priests: 56 (diocesan); 34 (Religious Orders)

Current leadership
- Pope: Leo XIV
- Bishop: Antonio Suetta
- Bishops emeritus: Alberto Maria Careggio

Map

Website
- www.diocesiventimiglia.it

The Diocese of Ventimiglia-Sanremo (Latin: Dioecesis Ventimiliensis-Sancti Romuli) is a Latin diocese of the Catholic Church in Liguria, northern Italy. The name of the historic Diocese of Ventimiglia (dioecesis Albintimiliensis, and Intimiliensis) was changed in 1975. It was originally a suffragan diocese of the Metropolitanate of Milan up to 1806, when it was transferred to the Metropolitanate of Aix; but it has been a suffragan of the Archdiocese of Genoa since 1818.

== History ==
It is probable that Ventimiglia had a bishop from the fifth century; the first known is Joannes (680).

Bishop Gianfrancesco Gandolfo (1623–1633) negotiated the peace between Savoy and Genoa, which was proclaimed on 10 August 1634.

=== French occupation ===
In 1798, at the beginning of the occupation of Ventimiglia by the French, the French Directory ordered the confiscation of all the gold and silver in the churches and convents of the diocese. The Cathedral lost its large silver chandeliers, and other precious objects including the silver bust and reliquary of S. Secondo. The Biblioteca Aprosiana lost its manuscripts and incunabula. The diocese of Ventimiglia had been reduced to only thirty-six parishes: two in Monaco, nineteen in the domains of the House of Savoy, and fourteen in the Republic of Geneva. In 1802, Cardinal Giovanni Battista Caprara, the Papal Legate to First Consul N. Bonaparte, wrote to the Chapter of Ventimiglia, in the absence of a bishop, demanding the surrender to the French of those parishes in territory under French control. These included the two parishes in Monaco (Mentone and Roccabruna) and the 19 which had belonged to the Kingdom of Sardinia. The Chapter complied, and the diocese was reduced to only fourteen parishes.

On 5 April 1806, at the demand of Bonaparte, now Emperor Napoleon I, Pope Pius VII issued the Bull Expositum cum nobis, by which the diocese of Ventimiglia was removed from the metropolitanate of Milan, and made a suffragan of the Archdiocese of Aix.

=== Restoration ===
On 30 May 1818, however, Pope Pius VII, in the Bull Sollicitudo omnium ecclesiarum, returned Ventimiglia to Italian control, in the form of the House of Savoy, which had been restored to the expanded Kingdom of Sardinia (the King was also Doge of Genoa), and assigned the diocese to the metropolitanate of Genoa.

On 10 July 1886, the small parish of Garavano, which had fallen into French territory, was transferred by agreement between the Bishop of Ventimiglia and the Bishop of Nice from the diocese of Ventimiglia to the diocese of Nice; the transfer was approved by Pope Leo XIII.

On 3 July 1975, the Sacred Congregation of Bishops in the Roman Curia issued a decree, requested by Bishop Angelo Raimondo Verardo, (1967–1988) and authorized by Pope Paul VI, granting a change in the name of the diocese to Ventimiglia-San Remo; a second decree raised the Church of S. Syrus in the city of San Remo to the status of co-cathedral in the diocese of Ventimiglia-San Remo.

=== Synods ===
A diocesan synod was an irregular but important meeting of the bishop of a diocese and his clergy. Its purpose was (1) to proclaim generally the various decrees already issued by the bishop; (2) to discuss and ratify measures on which the bishop chose to consult with his clergy; (3) to publish statutes and decrees of the diocesan synod, of the provincial synod, and of the Holy See.

A diocesan synod was held by Bishop Domenico Vaccari (1502–1511), in which the subject of witches and the procurement of abortions figured prominently. Bishop Stefano Spinola presided over his first diocesan synod in 1608. A synod, his second, was held by Bishop Mauro Promontorio (1654–1685) on 5–6 July 1683. In 1784, Bishop Domenico Maria Clavarini, O.P. (1775–1797) presided over a diocesan synod.

A diocesan synod was held by Bishop Lorenzo Biale (1837–1877) on 29, 30, and 31 May 1844. Bishop Tommaso Reggio (1877–1892) held another synod on 19, 20, and 21 September 1881. Reggio held his second synod at the diocesan seminary on 3 September 1886.

=== Cathedral and Chapter ===
The Chapter of the Cathedral of S. Maria Assumpta consisted of three dignities (the Provost, the Archdeacon and the Cantor) and eight Canons. On 8 June 1182, Pope Lucius III (1181–1185) confirmed the Chapter in its possessions, rights, and privileges, and granted them the right to elect their own Provost. They were also granted the right of presentation of suitable persons to the churches and chapels in the diocese in their possession. These two grants removed powers from the exercise of the bishop of the diocese and placed them in the hands of the Chapter.

The Chapter had a set of Statutes, which were last codified in 1539 and remained in force down into the end of the 18th century. According to these statutes, a Canon might take leave of his Chapter duties for as long as three months per year, without having to have an explanation, so long as the time was not consecutive and a substitute priest or chorister was provided by the Canon so that his duties were carried out. In 1624, however, due to a diminution in the number of Canons, the regulations were tightened so that no more than three Canons could be absent at any one time. By 1787, the situation had improved, and several Canons instituted proceedings against the Bishop and other Canons to return to the old rule. The Sacred Congregation of Rites in the Roman Curia granted their petition.

In 1752, a dispute arose between the Bishop and the Chapter of Ventimiglia. The custom had been that the Tenth (decima), which was owed to the bishop, and the Tenth owed to the Chapter in the town of Ventimiglia and in eight villages and rural districts, were collected at the same time by the same officials. The collection officials were appointed in alternate years by the bishop and the Chapter, and the collections were placed in one warehouse. This custom was followed up to 1716. When some of the villagers, however, refused to pay, the bishop sent his procurators to collect his due portion; the Chapter complained, wishing to observe the old custom, but the bishop demanded a fee for his services; when the Chapter tried to collect the dues on their own, the villagers refused to hand them over. The Chapter then instituted suit in the Papal Court, demanding a return to the old custom. The judgment was that the bishop's procurator and the Chapter's procurator could not be compelled to work together as one.

== Bishops ==
=== Diocese of Ventimiglia ===
==== to 1400 ====
...

- Joannes (attested 680)
- Lucius (attested 690)

...

- Mildo (attested c. 940)

...

- [Ignotus] (attested 962)

...

- Martinus (attested 1090, 1110)

...

- Stephanus (attested 1169, 1179; died 1193)
- Guido (attested 1198)
- Guilelmus (attested 1210; 1232)
- Nicolaus Lercari (1232 – c. 1244)
- Jacobus de Castello Arquato, O,P. (1244–1250)
- Atto (1251–1262)
- ? Norgandus
- Joannes de Alzati
- Ubertus Visconti (attested 1265)
- Joannes (1297–1303)
- Otho (1304–1319)
- Raimundus, O.Min. (1320–1328)
- Petrus, O.P. (1328–1345)
- Bonifacius, O.S.A. (1345–1348)
- Angelus (1348–1350)
- Pinus (1350–1352)
- Ruffinus (1352–1373)
- Robertus (1373–1380)
- Bertrandus (1381–1392) (Avignon Obedience)
- Petrus (Marinaco), O.Min. (1392–1409) (Avignon Obedience)
- Bartholomeus (1409) (Avignon Obedience)
- Jacobus Fieschi (c. 1381–1382) (Roman Obedience)
- Benedictus Boccanegra (1382–1411) (Roman Obedience)

==== 1400 to 1700 ====
- Thomas Judicia (1415– ? ) (Avignon Obedience)
- Thomas de Amelia (1419–1422)
- Ottobono de Valencia (1422–1435)
- Jacobus Feo de Saona (1452–1467)
- Stephanus de Robeis (1467–1471)
- Battista dei Giudici. O.P. (22 Apr 1471 – 26 Apr 1482)
- Antonio Pallavicini Gentili (15 Jun 1484 – 27 January 1486)
- Alessandro de Campofregoso (5 March 1487 – 1502)
- Domenico Vaccari (24 Jan 1502 – 1511)
- Alessandro Campofregoso (1511–1518)

Cardinal Innocenzo Cibo (Cybo)

- Carlo Visconti (5 Dec 1561 – 6 Jul 1565)
- Benedetto Lomellini (1565) (Bishop-elect)
- Carlo Grimaldi (8 Dec 1565 – 26 Nov 1572)
- Francesco Galbiati (1573 – 1600)
- Stefano Spínola, C.R. (15 Apr 1602 – 22 Dec 1613)
- Girolamo Curlo (27 Aug 1614 – 13 Nov 1616)
- Nicolò Spínola, C.R. (30 Jan 1617 – 23 Sep 1622)
- Giovanni Francesco Gandolfo (20 Mar 1623 – 10 Jan 1633)
- Lorenzo Gavotti, C.R. (20 Jun 1633 – 27 Jan 1653)
- Mauro Promontorio, O.S.B. (22 May 1654 – 4 Jan 1685)
- Giovanni Girolamo Naselli (10 Sep 1685 – 7 Feb 1695)
- Giovanni Stefano Pastori (2 May 1695 – 29 May 1700)

==== since 1700 ====
- Ambrogio Spinola, B. (6 Jun 1701 – 10 Mar 1710)
- Carlo Maria Mascardi, B. (7 Apr 1710 – 9 Dec 1731)
- Antonio Maria Bacigalupi, Sch. P. (31 Mar 1732 – 15 Jul 1740)
- Pier Maria Giustiniani, O.S.B. (17 Apr 1741 – 5 Oct 1765)

Sede vacante (1765–1767)

- Angelo Luigi Giovo, O.S.B. (28 Sep 1767 – 6 Apr 1774)
- Domenico Maria Clavarini, O.P. (13 Mar 1775 – 1 Oct 1797)

Sede vacante (1797–1804)

- Paolo Girolamo Orengo, Sch. P. (24 Sep 1804 – 30 May 1812)
- Felice Levreri (Levrieri) (2 Oct 1820 Confirmed – 5 May 1824)
- Giovanni Battista de Albertis (28 Feb 1831 Confirmed – 12 Nov 1836 Resigned)
- Lorenzo Giovanni Battista Biale (19 May 1837 – 26 Jun 1877)
- Tommaso Reggio (26 Jun 1877 – 11 Jul 1892)
- Ambrogio Daffra (11 Jul 1892 – 3 Aug 1932)
- Agostino Rousset (27 Jan 1933 – 3 Oct 1965)
- Angelo Raimondo Verardo, O.P. (8 Apr 1967 – 7 Dec 1988 Retired)

=== Diocese of Ventimiglia-San Remo ===
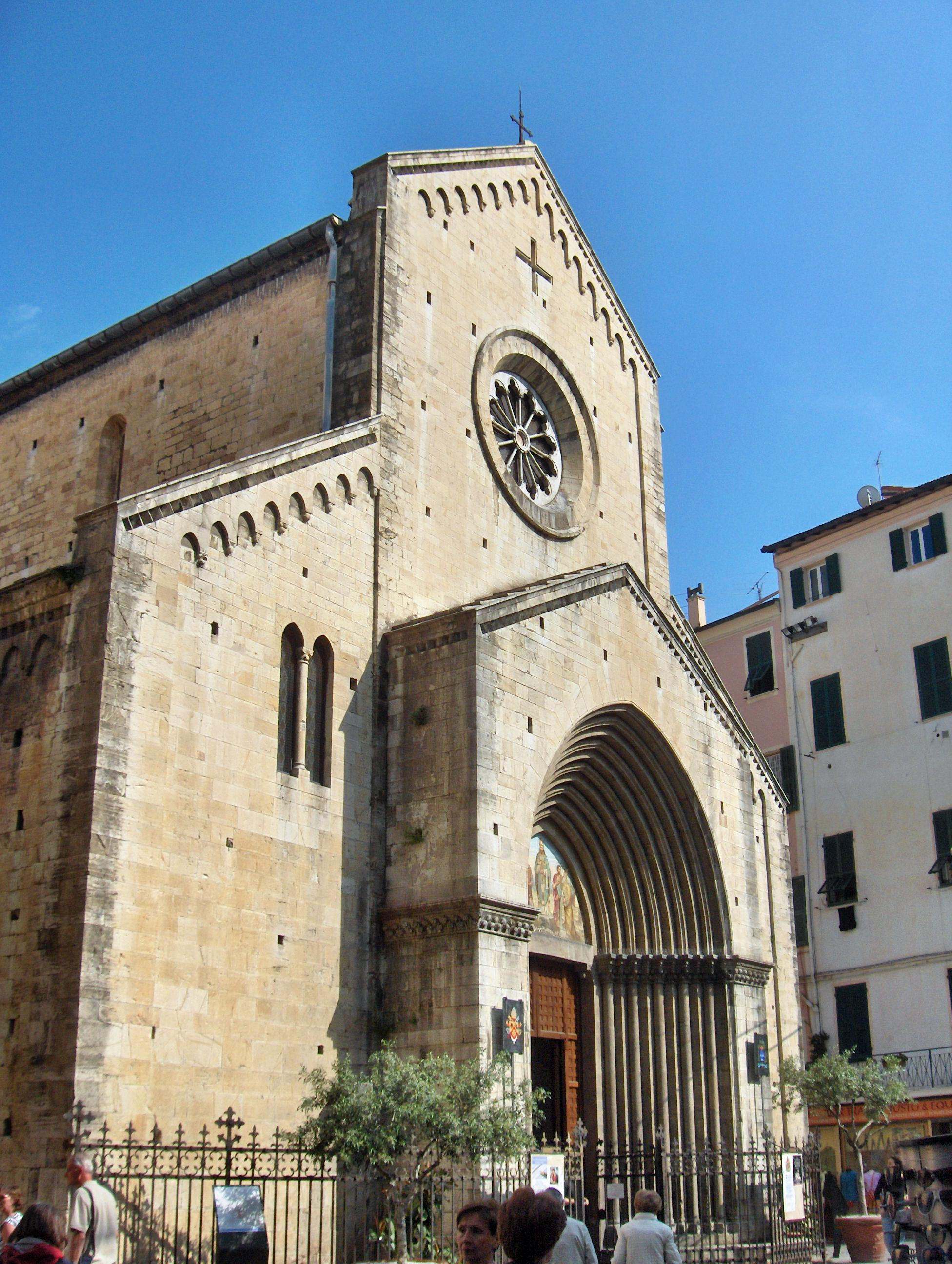
Co-cathedral in San Remo

Name Changed: 3 July 1975

- Giacomo Barabino (7 Dec 1988 – 20 Mar 2004 Retired)
- Alberto Maria Careggio (20 Mar 2004 – 25 Jan 2014 Retired)
- Antonio Suetta (25 Jan 2014 – )

== Parishes ==
In a bull of 29 June 1831, Pope Gregory XVI reassigned eight parishes from the diocese of Nice and 25 from Albenga to the diocese of Vintimiglia. In 1921, there were 75 parishes, staffed by 210 secular and religious priests.

Of the 99 parishes, all but two are in the Province of Imperia, Liguria. The others are in the Province of Cuneo in Piedmont.

=== Liguria ===
==== Province of Imperia ====
Airole
S. Clemente
Santi Filippo e Giacomo
Apricale
Purificazione di Maria Vergine
Badalucco
S. Maria Assunta e S.Giorgio
SS. Vergine del Rosario
Bajardo
S. Nicolò da Bari
Bordighera
Immacolata Concezione
S. Maria Maddalena
S. Nicolò da Bari
Santi Pietro e Paolo
Camporosso
S. Marco Evangelista
SS. Trinità (Trinità)
Carpasio
S. Antonino
Castel Vittorio
S. Stefano Protomartire
Castellaro
S. Pietro in Vincoli
Ceriana
Santi Pietro e Paolo
Cipressa
Natività di Maria Vergine
Nostra Signora degli Angeli
Visitazione di Maria Santissima
Costarainera
S. Antonio Abate
Dolceacqua
S. Antonio Abate
Isolabona
S. Maria Maddalena
Mendatica
S. Giacomo Maggiore
Molini di Triora
Natività di Maria Santissima
Natività di Maria Vergine
Nostra Signora della Misericordia
S. Carlo Borromeo
S. Giacomo Apostolo
S. Lorenzo Martire
S. Vincenzo Ferreri
Santi Faustino e Giovita
Montalto Ligure
Santi Giovanni Battista e Giorgio
Olivetta San Michele
S. Antonio Da Padova
Santi Angeli Custodi
Ospedaletti
S. Giovanni Battista
Perinaldo
S. Nicolò di Bari
Pietrabruna
S. Bernardo
Santi Cosma e Damiano
Pigna
S. Giovanni Battista
S. Michele Arcangelo
Pompeiana
Nostra Signora Assunta
Riva Ligure
S. Maurizio Martire
Rocchetta Nervina
S. Stefano Protomartire
San Biagio della Cima
Santi Fabiano e Sebastiano
San Lorenzo al Mare
S. Maria Maddalena
Sanremo
Annunciazione (Borgo)
Natività di Maria Vergine
Nostra Signora del Rosario (Baragallo)
Nostra Signora della Mercede (S.Martino)
Nostra Signora della Misericordia (Marina)
S. Antonio
S. Bartolomeo
S. Donato
S. Giuseppe
S. Lorenzo Martire (Solaro)
S. Maria degli Angeli
S. Pietro Apostolo
S. Rocco
S. Romolo Vescovo
S. Siro nella Concattedrale
Sacro Cuore di Gesù (Bussana)
S. Sebastiano (Coldirodi)
S. Margherita (Poggio di Sanremo)
S. Giacomo Apostolo (San Giacomo)
Santo Stefano al Mare
S. Stefano Protomartire
Seborga
S. Martino Vescovo
Soldano
S. Giovanni Battista
Taggia
Santi Apostoli Giacomo e Filippo
Santi Francesco Saverio e Paola Romana Levà (Arma di Taggia)
Santi Giuseppe e Antonio (Arma di Taggia)
Terzorio
Natività di S. Giovanni Battista
Triora
Natività di Maria Santissima
Nostra Signora Assunta
Nostra Signora del Carmelo
Nostra Signora del Rosario
SS. Nome di Maria
Vallebona
S. Lorenzo Martire
Vallecrosia
Maria Ausiliatrice
S. Rocco
S. Antonio Abate (Vallecrosia Alta)
Ventimiglia
Addolorata e S.Luigi
Cattedrale Nostra Signora Assunta
Cristo Re
Natività di Maria SS.
Nostra Signora di Lourdes e S.Lorenzo
S. Agostino
S. Giovanni Battista
S. Michele Arcangelo
S. Nicola Da Tolentino
S. Pancrazio
S. Secondo
S. Teresa d’Avila
Santi Pietro e Paolo
Natività di Maria SS.Ma (Grimaldi di Ventimiglia)
Santi Angeli Custodi (Grimaldi di Ventimiglia)
S. Mauro (La Mortola Inferiore)
S. Bartolomeo (Latte)

=== Piedmont ===
==== Province of Cuneo ====
Ormea
Nostra Signora della Neve
S. Anna

== Books ==
- Eubel, Conradus, ed. (1913). Hierarchia catholica, Tomus 1 (in Latin) (second ed.). Münster: Libreria Regensbergiana.
- Eubel, Conradus, ed. (1914). Hierarchia catholica, Tomus 2 (second ed.). Münster: Libreria Regensbergiana.
- Eubel, Conradus, ed. (1923). Hierarchia catholica, Tomus 3 (second ed.). Münster: Libreria Regensbergiana.
- Gams, Pius Bonifatius (1873). Series episcoporum Ecclesiae catholicae: quotquot innotuerunt a beato Petro apostolo (in Latin). Ratisbon: Typis et Sumptibus Georgii Josephi Manz.
- Gauchat, Patritius (1935). Hierarchia catholica IV (1592-1667). Münster: Libraria Regensbergiana.
- Ritzler, Remigius; Sefrin, Pirminus (1952). Hierarchia catholica medii et recentis aevi V (1667-1730). Patavii: Messagero di S. Antonio.
- Ritzler, Remigius; Sefrin, Pirminus (1958). Hierarchia catholica medii et recentis aevi VI (1730-1799). Patavii: Messagero di S. Antonio.
- Ritzler, Remigius; Sefrin, Pirminus (1968). Hierarchia Catholica medii et recentioris aevi sive summorum pontificum, S. R. E. cardinalium, ecclesiarum antistitum series... A pontificatu Pii PP. VII (1800) usque ad pontificatum Gregorii PP. XVI (1846) (in Latin). Vol. VII. Monasterii: Libr. Regensburgiana.
- Remigius Ritzler; Pirminus Sefrin (1978). Hierarchia catholica Medii et recentioris aevi... A Pontificatu PII PP. IX (1846) usque ad Pontificatum Leonis PP. XIII (1903) (in Latin). Vol. VIII. Il Messaggero di S. Antonio.
- Pięta, Zenon (2002). Hierarchia catholica medii et recentioris aevi... A pontificatu Pii PP. X (1903) usque ad pontificatum Benedictii PP. XV (1922) (in Latin). Vol. IX. Padua: Messagero di San Antonio. ISBN 978-88-250-1000-8.

=== Studies ===
- Kehr, Paul Fridolin (1914). Italia pontificia : sive, Repertorium privilegiorum et litterarum a romanis pontificibus ante annum 1598 Italiae ecclesiis, monasteriis, civitatibus singulisque personis concessorum. Vol. VI. pars ii. Berolini: Weidmann. pp. 363–367.
- Lamboglia, Nino (1964). Ventimiglia romana. (in Italian). 2nd ed. Bordighera: Istituto internazionale di studi Liguri, 1964.
- Lanzoni, Francesco (1927). Le diocesi d'Italia dalle origini al principio del secolo VII (an. 604). Faenza: F. Lega, pp. 843–844.
- Rossi, Girolamo (1886). Storia della città di Ventimiglia (in Italian). Oneglia: Eredi G. Ghilini.
- Rossi, Girolamo (1907). "Documenti inediti riguardanti la chiesa di Ventimiglia." Miscellanea di storia italiana. Terza serie (in Italian). Vol. XI. Torino: Deputazione subalpina di storia patria, Fratelli Bocca. 1906. pp. 359–411. [list of bishops at pp. 407–411].
- Semeria, Giovanni Battista (1843). Secoli cristiani della Liguria, ossia, Storia della metropolitana di Genova, delle diocesi di Sarzana, di Brugnato, Savona, Noli, Albegna e Ventimiglia (in Italian). Vol. I. Torino: Tip. Chirio e Mina. Semeria, Giovanni Battista (1843). Volume II. [II, pp. 477–547]
- Ughelli, Ferdinando; Coleti, Niccolo (1719). Italia sacra, sive de episcopis Italiae et insularum adjacentium (in Latin). Vol. Tomus quartus (4) (2nd ed.). Venice: Apud Sebastianum Coleti. pp. 326–331.
