= Giacomo Barabino =

Italian Roman Catholic bishop

- Bishop of Ventimiglia-San Remo
- Church: Roman Catholic Church
- See: Diocese of Ventimiglia-San Remo
- In office: 1988–2004
- Predecessor: Angelo Raimondo Verardo
- Successor: Alberto Maria Careggio

Orders
- Ordination: 29 June 1952
- Consecration: 24 June 1974 by Cardinal Giuseppe Siri

Personal details
- Born: 2 April 1928 Ceranesi, Italy
- Died: 25 May 2016 (aged 88) Vallecrosia, Italy
- Coat of arms

Giacomo Barabino (2 April 1928 – 25 May 2016) was a Roman Catholic bishop.

Barabino was born in 1928 in Livellato, a suburb of Ceranesi (diocese of Genoa). He was ordained to the priesthood in 1952 by Archbishop Giuseppe Siri of Genoa, and served as parish priest at Pegli and S. Siro a Nervi. On 14 July 1953, he was appointed Private Secretary of the Archbishop, who had been named a cardinal in January 1953.

On 25 May 1974 he was named a bishop by Pope Paul VI, and given the title of Bishop of Ravello. He was consecrated a bishop on 24 June in Genoa by Cardinal Siri. Barabino served as auxiliary bishop of the Roman Catholic Diocese of Bobbio, Italy, from 1974 until 1986. When Bobbio was combined with Genoa to form the Diocese of Genoa-Bobbio in 1986, he became an auxiliary bishop of Genoa and Vicar General of Genoa-Bobbio. On 7 December 1988 he was transferred to the Roman Catholic Diocese of Ventimiglia-San Remo, Italy, by Pope John Paul II, where he served as bishop of the diocese from 1988 until his resignation on 20 March 2004 at the age of 75.

From 1991 to 1995 he was President of the Administrative Council of the newspaper L'avvenire, the Italian Catholic daily newspaper.

Bishop-emeritus Barabino died on 25 May 2016.
