= Apricale =

- Comune
- Comune di Apricale
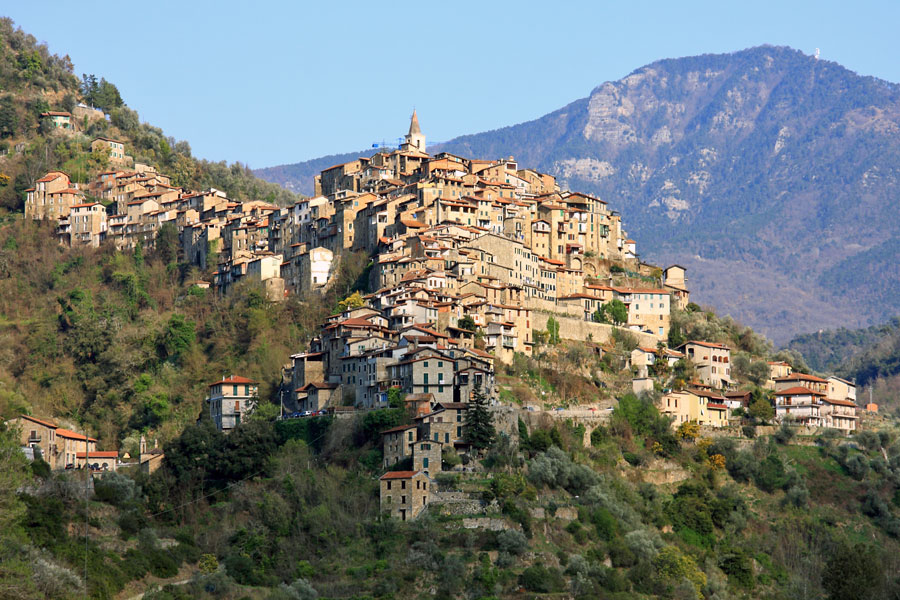
- View of Apricale

- Coat of arms

- Location of Apricale in Italy Apricale (Liguria)
- Coordinates: 43°53′N 7°40′E
- Country: Italy
- Region: Liguria
- Province: Imperia (IM)
- Frazioni: Foa, Regione Osaggio, Semolgo

Government
  - Mayor: Silvano Pisano

Area
  - Total: 19.7 km^{2} (7.6 sq mi)
- Elevation: 291 m (955 ft)

Population (31 December 2008)
  - Total: 573
  - Density: 29.1/km^{2} (75.3/sq mi)
- Demonym: Apricalesi
- Time zone: UTC+1 (CET)
  - Summer (DST): UTC+2 (CEST)
- Postal code: 18030
- Dialing code: 0184
- Website: Official website

Apricale (Ligurian: Avrigâ, locally Bligal or Vrigà) is a comune (municipality) in the Province of Imperia in the Italian region Liguria, located about 120 kilometres (75 mi) southwest of Genoa and about 30 kilometres (19 mi) west of Imperia.

Apricale borders the following municipalities: Bajardo, Castelvittorio, Dolceacqua, Isolabona, Perinaldo, Pigna, Rocchetta Nervina, and Sanremo. It is one of I Borghi più belli d'Italia ("The most beautiful villages of Italy").
