= Castel Vittorio =

Castelvittorio
- Comune
- Comune di Castelvittorio
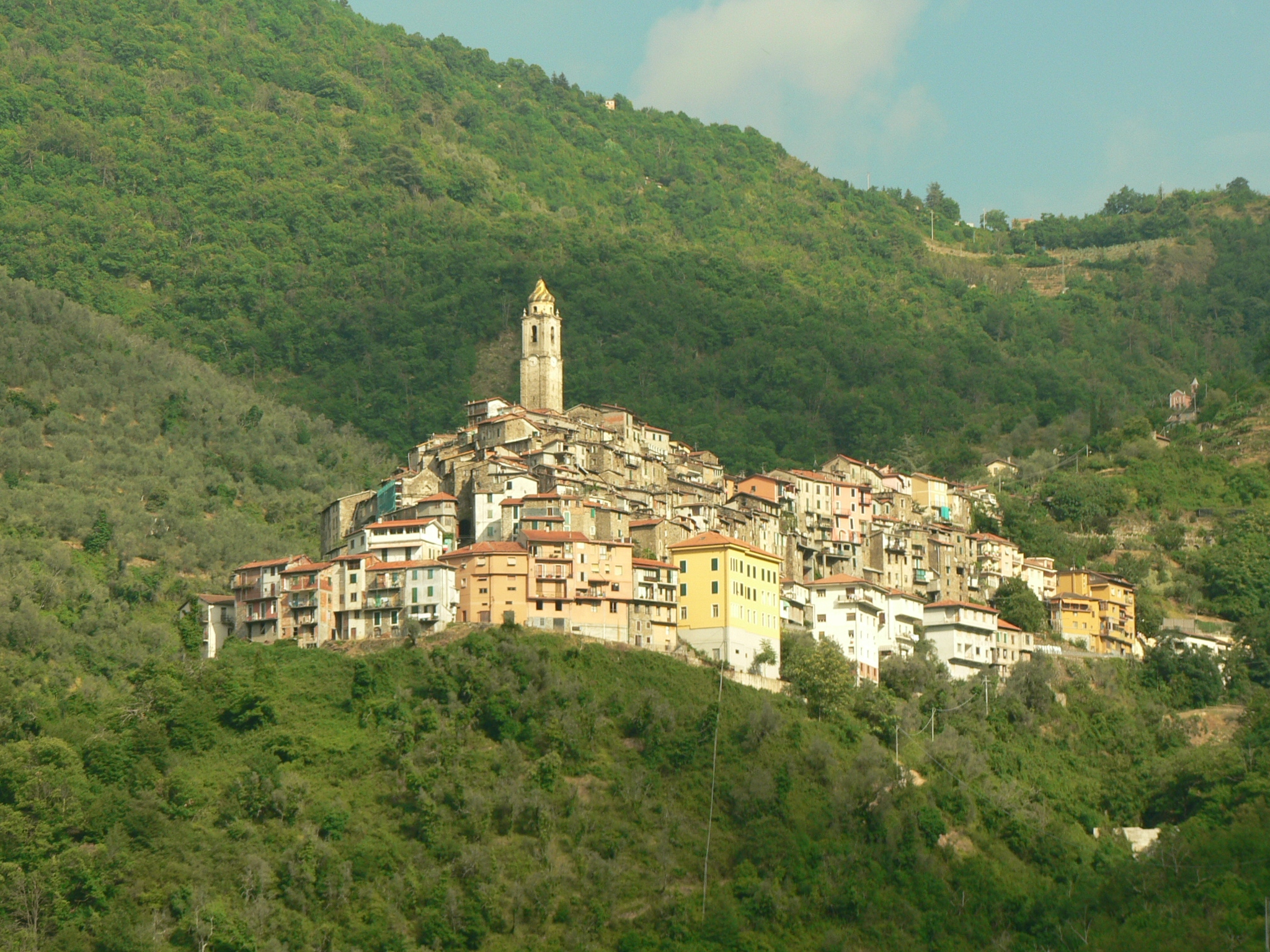
- View of Castel Vittorio

- Coat of arms

- Location within Italy Location within Liguria
- Coordinates: 43°55′N 7°40′E
- Country: Italy
- Region: Liguria
- Province: Imperia (IM)

Government
  - Mayor: Gian Stefano Orengo

Area
  - Total: 25.8 km^{2} (10.0 sq mi)
- Elevation: 420 m (1,380 ft)

Population (31 December 2008)
  - Total: 355
  - Density: 13.8/km^{2} (35.6/sq mi)
- Demonym: Castellesi
- Time zone: UTC+1 (CET)
  - Summer (DST): UTC+2 (CEST)
- Postal code: 18037
- Dialing code: 0184
- Patron saint: St. Stephen
- Saint day: 26 December
- Website: Official website

Castelvittorio (Ligurian: Caste, locally U Casté) is a comune (municipality) in the Province of Imperia in the Italian region Liguria, located about 120 kilometres (75 mi) southwest of Genoa and about 30 kilometres (19 mi) west of Imperia.

Castelvittorio borders the following municipalities: Apricale, Bajardo, Isolabona, Molini di Triora, Pigna and Triora.

The parish church of St. Stephen houses 16th or 17th century bas-relief, a Crucifixion of Jesus by Marcello Venusti (late 16th century) and a crucifix by Anton Maria Maragliano.
