= Dolceacqua =

- Comune
- Comune di Dolceacqua
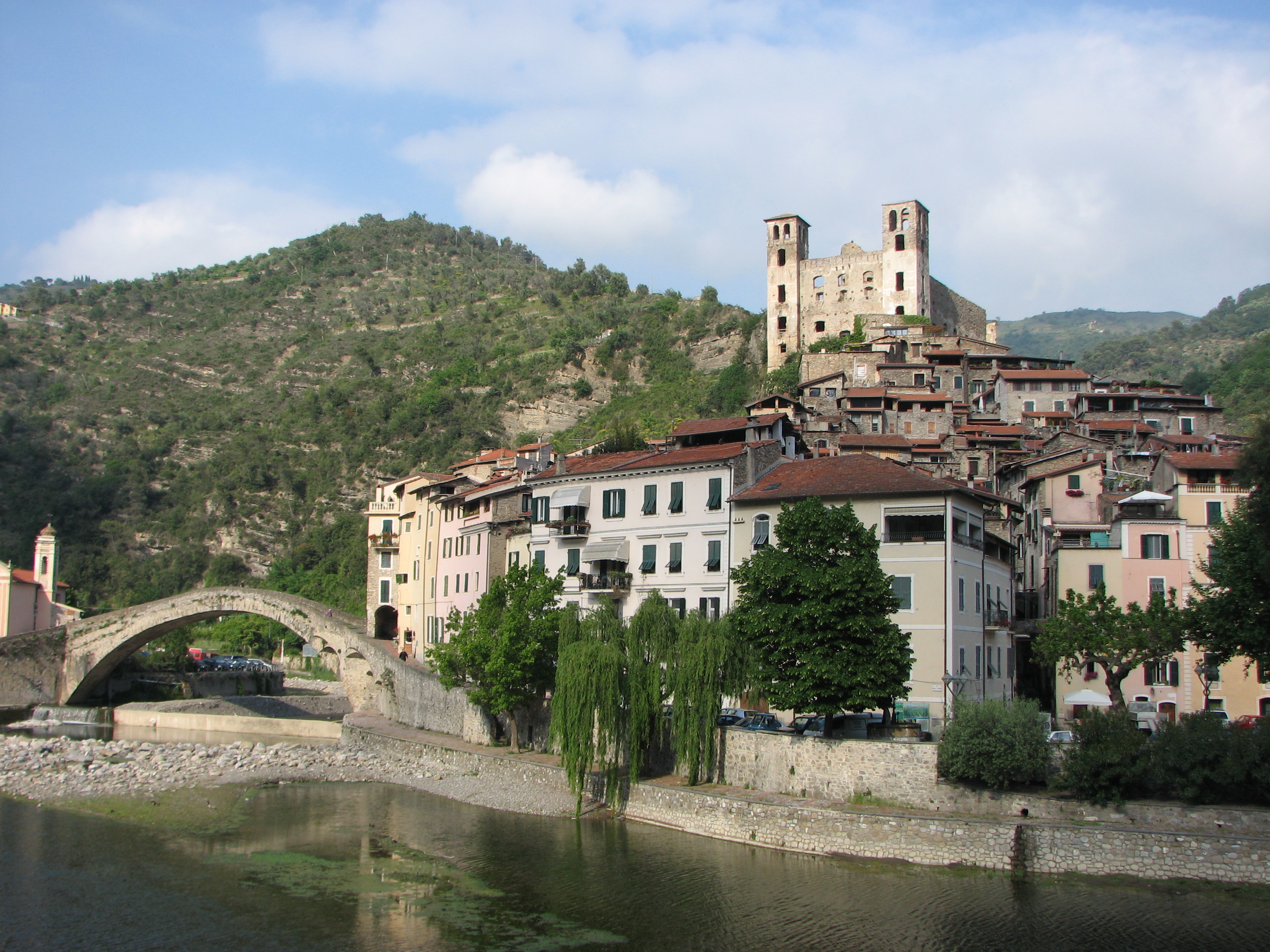
- View of Dolceacqua

- Coat of arms

- Location within Italy Location within Liguria
- Coordinates: 43°51′N 7°37′E
- Country: Italy
- Region: Liguria
- Province: Province of Imperia (IM)

Government
  - Mayor: Fulvio Gazzola

Area
  - Total: 20.2 km^{2} (7.8 sq mi)

Population (Dec. 2014)
  - Total: 2,078
  - Density: 103/km^{2} (266/sq mi)
- Demonym: Dolceacquini
- Time zone: UTC+1 (CET)
  - Summer (DST): UTC+2 (CEST)
- Postal code: 18035
- Dialing code: 0184
- Patron saint: sant'Antonio abate
- Saint day: Jan. 17
- Website: Official website

Dolceacqua (Ligurian: Dôsaiga, locally Dussaiga) is a comune (municipality) in the Province of Imperia in the Italian region Liguria, located about 120 kilometres (75 mi) southwest of Genoa and about 35 kilometres (22 mi) west of Imperia, on the border with France. As of 31 December 2014, it had a population of 2,078 and an area of 20.2 square kilometres (7.8 mi^{2})

Dolceacqua borders the following municipalities of Airole, Apricale, Breil-sur-Roya (France), Camporosso, Isolabona, Perinaldo, Rocchetta Nervina, San Biagio della Cima, and Ventimiglia.

Dolceacqua is the location of the Pinacoteca Giovanni Morscio, a museum dedicated to the works of local painter Morscio (1887–1972) and other 20th-century Italian and French artists. It is also known for its medieval bridge, which was painted by Claude Monet.

== Demographic evolution ==
Historical population

Year	Pop.	±%
1861	2,268	—
1871	2,426	+7.0%
1881	2,338	−3.6%
1901	2,442	+4.4%
1911	2,623	+7.4%

Year	Pop.	±%
1921	2,408	−8.2%
1931	2,093	−13.1%
1936	1,970	−5.9%
1951	1,806	−8.3%
1961	1,937	+7.3%

Year	Pop.	±%
1971	1,777	−8.3%
1981	1,850	+4.1%
1991	1,693	−8.5%
2001	1,901	+12.3%

Source: Data from ISTAT

== International relations ==
Dolceacqua is twinned with:

- Alpicat, Spain (2001)
- Monaco, Monaco (2023)
