= Aurigo =

- Comune
- Comune di Aurigo
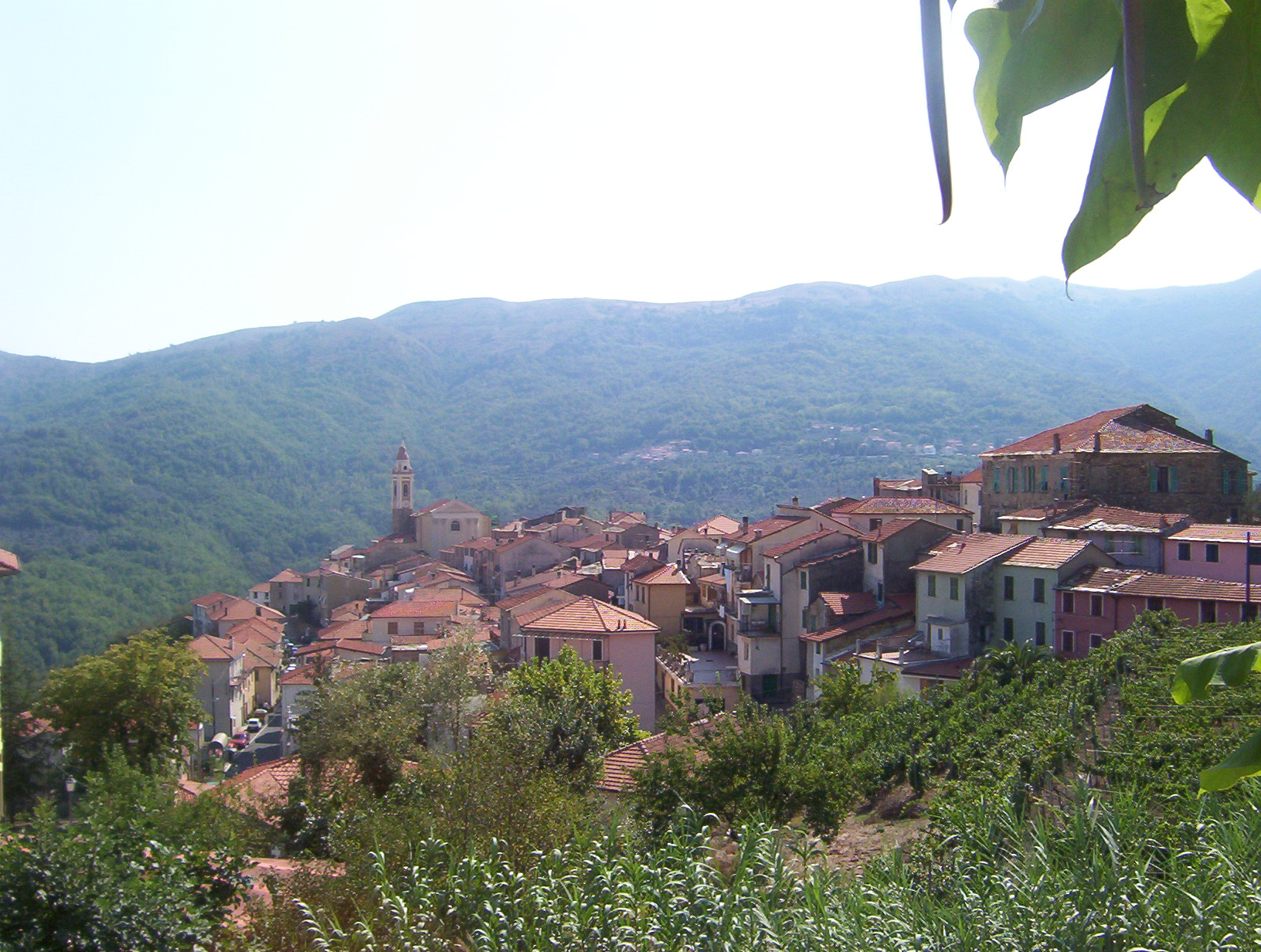
- View of Aurigo

- Location of Aurigo in Italy Aurigo (Liguria)
- Coordinates: 43°59′N 7°55′E
- Country: Italy
- Region: Liguria
- Province: Imperia (IM)

Government
  - Mayor: Luigino Dellerba

Area
  - Total: 9.14 km^{2} (3.53 sq mi)
- Elevation: 431 m (1,414 ft)

Population (30 April 2017)
  - Total: 335
  - Density: 36.7/km^{2} (94.9/sq mi)
- Time zone: UTC+1 (CET)
  - Summer (DST): UTC+2 (CEST)
- Postal code: 18021
- Dialing code: 0183
- Website: Official website

Aurigo (Ligurian: Aurigu) is a comune (municipality) in the Province of Imperia in the Italian region Liguria, located about 90 kilometres (56 mi) southwest of Genoa and about 15 kilometres (9 mi) northwest of Imperia.

Aurigo borders the following municipalities: Borgomaro, Pieve di Teco, and Rezzo.
