= Ceriana =

- Comune
- Comune di Ceriana
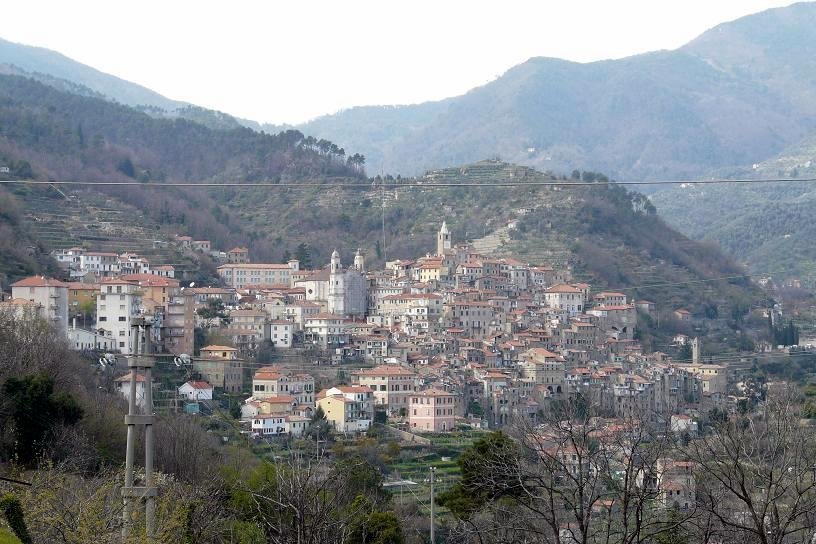
- View of Ceriana

- Location within Italy Location within Liguria
- Coordinates: 43°53′N 7°46′E
- Country: Italy
- Region: Liguria
- Province: Province of Imperia (IM)

Government
  - Mayor: Maurizio Caviglia

Area
  - Total: 32.1 km^{2} (12.4 sq mi)
- Elevation: 369 m (1,211 ft)

Population (2018)
  - Total: 1,214
  - Density: 37.8/km^{2} (98.0/sq mi)
- Demonym: Cerianaschi
- Time zone: UTC+1 (CET)
  - Summer (DST): UTC+2 (CEST)
- Postal code: 18034
- Dialing code: 0
- Website: Official website

Ceriana (locally Çeriana, Genoese: Çeriann-a) is a comune (municipality) in the Province of Imperia in the Italian region Liguria, located about 110 kilometres (68 mi) southwest of Genoa and about 20 kilometres (12 mi) west of Imperia. As of 2018, it had a population of 1,214 and an area of 32.1 square kilometres (12.4 mi^{2}).

Ceriana borders the following municipalities: Badalucco, Bajardo, Sanremo, and Taggia.

== History ==
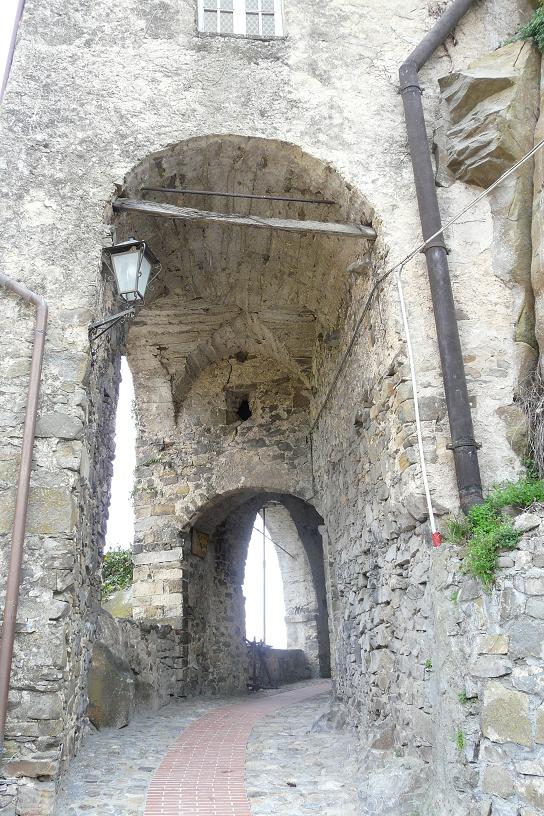
Passageway in Ceriana

Built on the site of a Roman fort, Castrum Colianum (from whence the name Ceriana derives), the city took its present shape mostly in the 11th and 12th centuries C.E. Gian Battista Embriaco (1829–1903), professor at the Roman College of Saint Thomas and the inventor in 1867 of the hydrochronometer, was born in Ceriana. Examples of his hydrochronometer can be found in Rome on the gardens of the Pincian Hill and in the Villa Borghese gardens. Embriaco had presented two prototypes of his invention at the Paris Universal Exposition in 1867 where it won prizes and great acclaim.

== Culture ==
=== Celebrities ===
Giulio Natta, nobel prize for chemistry in 1963, lived in Ceriana, on via della visitazione. Today, there is a plaque in his memory next to his house.

=== Festivals ===
Despite its small population, Ceriana hosts celebrations and events on its main square on most weekends throughout the year, drawing tourists from nearby Sanremo, Nice and beyond. Annual festivals include:

- San Zane Festival, La Festa di San Zane (San Giovanni)
- International Music Festival of the Earth, Festival Convegno Internazionale Musiche della Terra
- Ceriana Sausage Festival, La Sagra della Soucisa a Serianasca
- The Madonna of the Villa, La Madonna della Villa
- Chestnut Festival, Festa della Castagna also called Festa de Rustìe in local dialect, cerianasco

=== Music ===
La Banda Musicale di Ceriana (The Music Band of Ceriana) was originally formed in 1882. Its current iteration was reformed in 1950.

=== Easter Procession ===
Several events are held during the Holy Week, La Settimana Santa, around the Catholic Easter, culminating in a series of processions in which four choirs consisting of local men sing ancient Latin chants through the streets of Ceriana and in the main church.

== Demographics ==
Historical population

Year	Pop.	±%
1861	2,400	—
1871	2,565	+6.9%
1881	2,541	−0.9%
1901	2,633	+3.6%
1911	2,717	+3.2%

Year	Pop.	±%
1921	2,672	−1.7%
1931	2,274	−14.9%
1936	2,217	−2.5%
1951	2,090	−5.7%
1961	1,904	−8.9%

Year	Pop.	±%
1971	1,563	−17.9%
1981	1,371	−12.3%
1991	1,290	−5.9%
2001	1,305	+1.2%
2011	1,252	−4.1%

Source: Data from ISTAT

== Twin towns – sister cities ==
Ceriana is twinned with:

- Guisa, Cuba
