= Isolabona =

Isolabona L'Isora
- Comune
- Comune di Isolabona
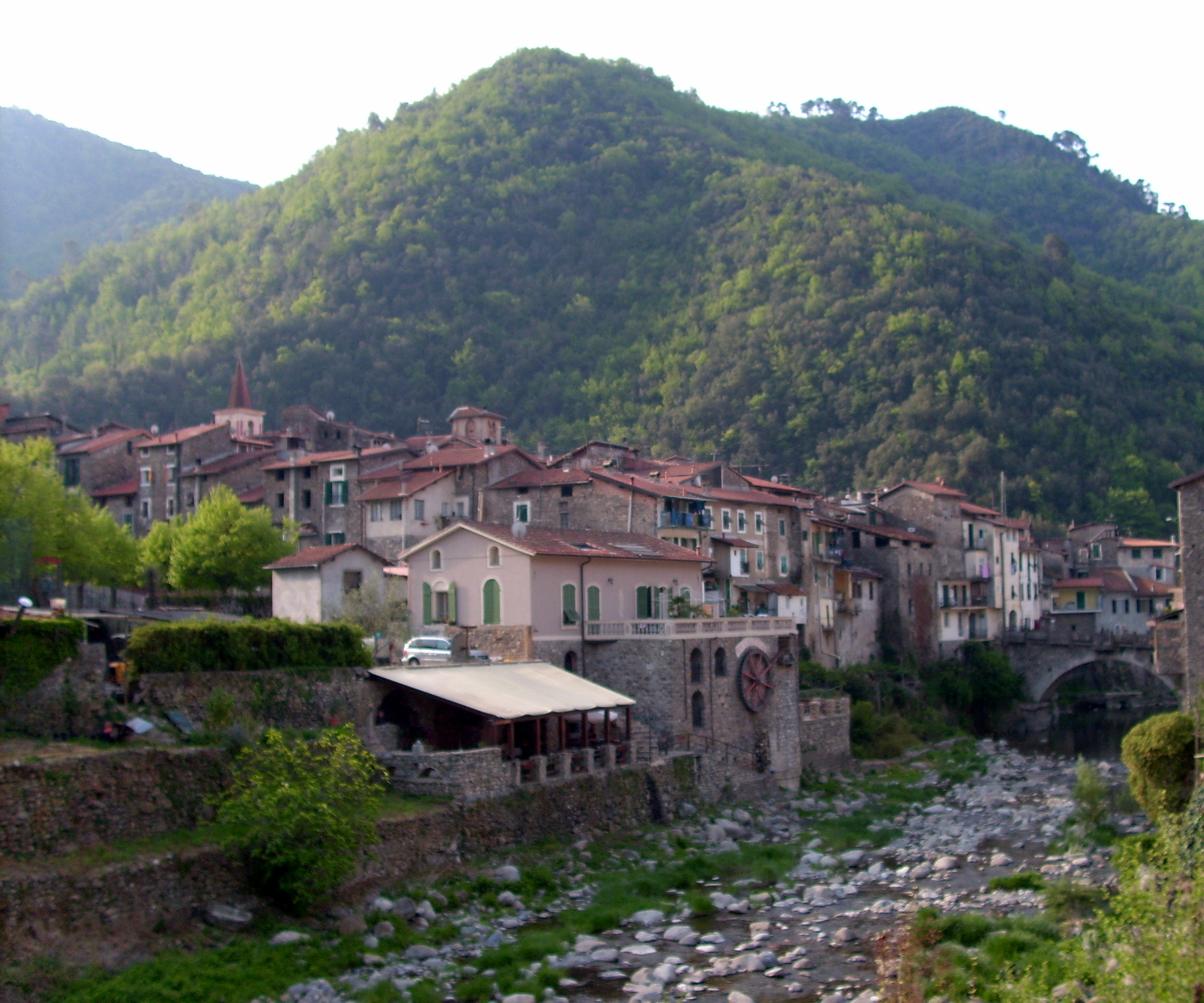
- View of Isolabona

- Coat of arms

- Location within Italy Location within Liguria
- Coordinates: 43°53′N 7°38′E
- Country: Italy
- Region: Liguria
- Province: Imperia (IM)

Area
  - Total: 12.4 km^{2} (4.8 sq mi)

Population (Dec. 2004)
  - Total: 715
  - Density: 57.7/km^{2} (149/sq mi)
- Time zone: UTC+1 (CET)
  - Summer (DST): UTC+2 (CEST)
- Postal code: 18030
- Dialing code: 0184

Isolabona (Ligurian: L'Isora) is a comune (municipality) in the Province of Imperia in the Italian region Liguria, located about 120 kilometres (75 mi) southwest of Genoa and about 30 kilometres (19 mi) west of Imperia. As of 2011, it had a population of 716, spread between 333 families throughout an area of 12.4 square kilometres (4.8 mi^{2}).

Isolabona shares borders the following municipalities: Apricale, Castelvittorio, Dolceacqua, Pigna and Rocchetta Nervina.

== Demographic evolution ==
Historical population

Year	Pop.	±%
1861	1,028	—
1871	1,070	+4.1%
1881	1,171	+9.4%
1901	1,170	−0.1%
1911	1,150	−1.7%

Year	Pop.	±%
1921	1,110	−3.5%
1931	967	−12.9%
1936	907	−6.2%
1951	848	−6.5%
1961	761	−10.3%

Year	Pop.	±%
1971	653	−14.2%
1981	639	−2.1%
1991	636	−0.5%
2001	643	+1.1%

Source: Data from ISTAT
