= Pigna, Liguria =

Pigna
- Comune
- Comune di Pigna
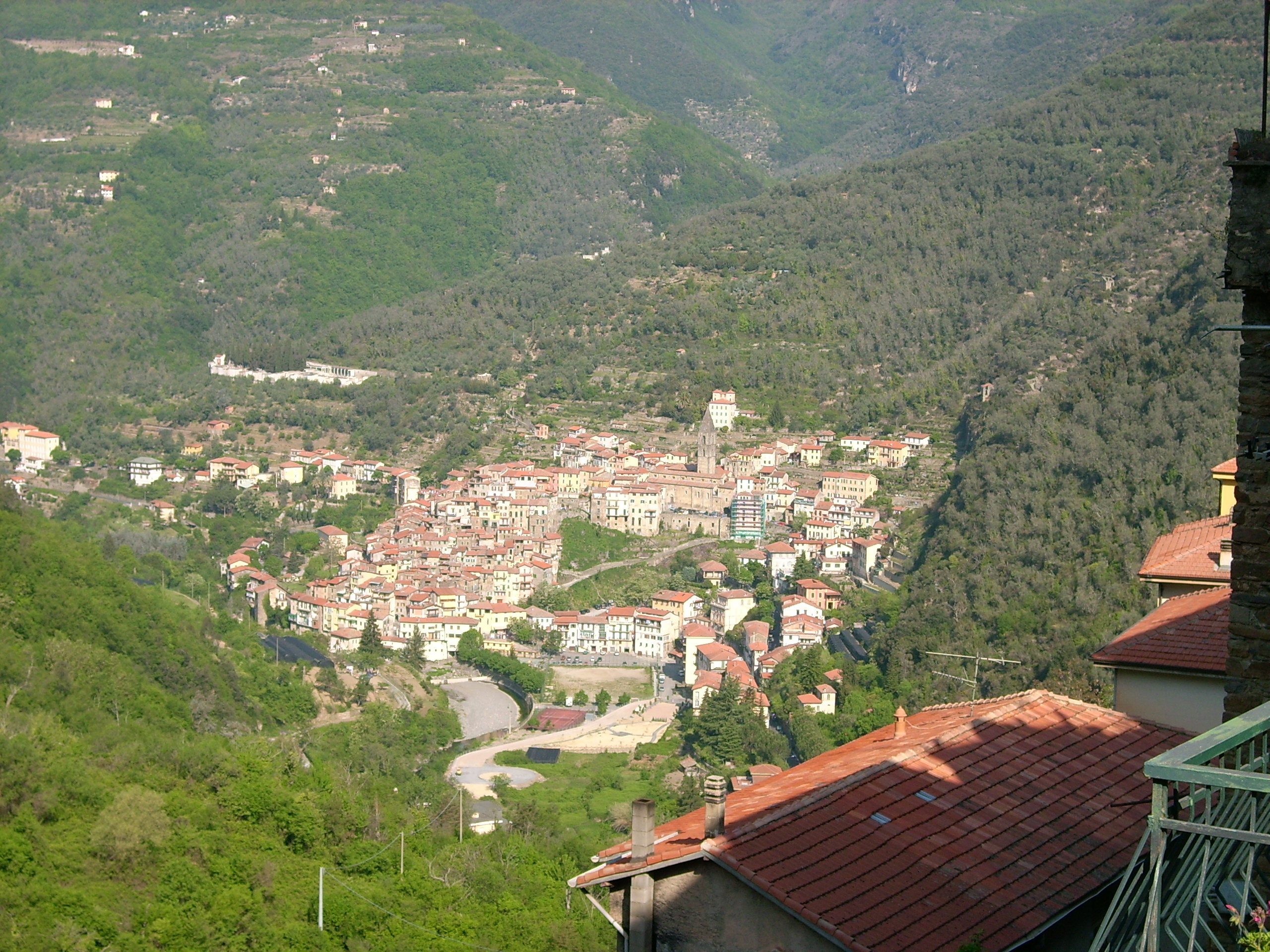
- View of Pigna

- Coat of arms

- Location within Italy Location within Liguria
- Coordinates: 43°56′N 7°40′E
- Country: Italy
- Region: Liguria
- Province: Province of Imperia (IM)
- Frazioni: Buggio

Area
  - Total: 53.7 km^{2} (20.7 sq mi)
- Elevation: 280 m (920 ft)

Population (June 30, 2019)
  - Total: 795
  - Density: 14.8/km^{2} (38.3/sq mi)
- Demonym: Pignaschi
- Time zone: UTC+1 (CET)
  - Summer (DST): UTC+2 (CEST)
- Postal code: 18037
- Dialing code: 0184

Pigna is a comune (municipality) in the Province of Imperia in the Italian region of Liguria, located about 110 kilometres (68 mi) southwest of Genoa and about 30 kilometres (19 mi) west of Imperia, on the border with France. In 2024, it has an evaluated population of 741 and an area of 53.7 square kilometres (20.7 mi^{2}).

The municipality of Pigna contains the frazione (subdivision) Buggio.

Pigna borders the following municipalities: Apricale, Castelvittorio, Isolabona, Rocchetta Nervina, Saorge (France), and Triora.

== History ==
In the southernmost district of North West Italy, in a region called Liguria, can be found the valley of Nervia. The ancient village is on the slopes of the valley. Situated beneath the Piccole Dolomiti, it is near Monte Toraggio, which rises to 1,973 metres (6,473 ft) above sea level.

Archaeological remains found in the countryside surrounding Pigna have led to prehistoric evidence of human settlements dating back 60,000 years. Its current location is not the original location. In the 10th century, the village was located closer to the valley floor around the Church of San Tommaso, but the position was too vulnerable and the politics surrounding the town too volatile, so the location farther up the hill was chosen for a new settlement. In Loggia Della Piazza Vecchia, there is evidence of the village's ancient commercial past.

Before 1258, the village belonged to the nobility of the coastal town of Ventimiglia, but later in that year, it yielded to the town of Anjou of Provence. Soon after, Guelph's of Provence and Ghibellines of Genoa were in a war, with Pigna on the side of the Guelph's. In 1365, a peace was signed between the two factions at Pigna's Lago Pigo Bridge, which became the dividing line between the territories of Provenza and the Republic of Genoa.

With the surrender of Nice in 1388 (a peacefully negotiated territory transfer, managed by the Grimaldi's of Monaco), Pigna passed from Provence's control to that of Savoy, which reignited tensions with the neighboring village of Castel Vittorio (an ally of Genoa). In 1727, some residents of Pigna stole the bells from Castel Vittorio's bell tower, now kept in the 56-meter-high tower next to the church. Castel Vittorio retaliated by stealing the stones from Pigna's village square. From 1625 to 1633, Pigna fell to the Genoese, but it went back under Savoy's control until the establishment of the kingdom of Italy in 1860.

== Population evolution ==
Historical population

Year	Pop.	±%
1861	3,386	—
1871	3,515	+3.8%
1881	3,421	−2.7%
1901	3,310	−3.2%
1911	3,056	−7.7%

Year	Pop.	±%
1921	2,821	−7.7%
1931	2,431	−13.8%
1936	2,389	−1.7%
1951	2,032	−14.9%
1961	2,001	−1.5%

Year	Pop.	±%
1971	1,699	−15.1%
1981	1,221	−28.1%
1991	1,055	−13.6%
2001	935	−11.4%

Source: Data from ISTAT

== Notable people ==
- Jean-Baptiste Pastor, property developer in Monaco, born in that same place

== See also ==
- Parco naturale regionale delle Alpi Liguri
- Liguria wine
