= Province of Imperia =

Province of Italy

Coordinates: 43°53′11.28″N 8°01′46.75″E

Province of Imperia Provincia di Imperia (Italian) Provinsa d'Imperia (Ligurian) Província d'Impèria (Occitan)
- Province
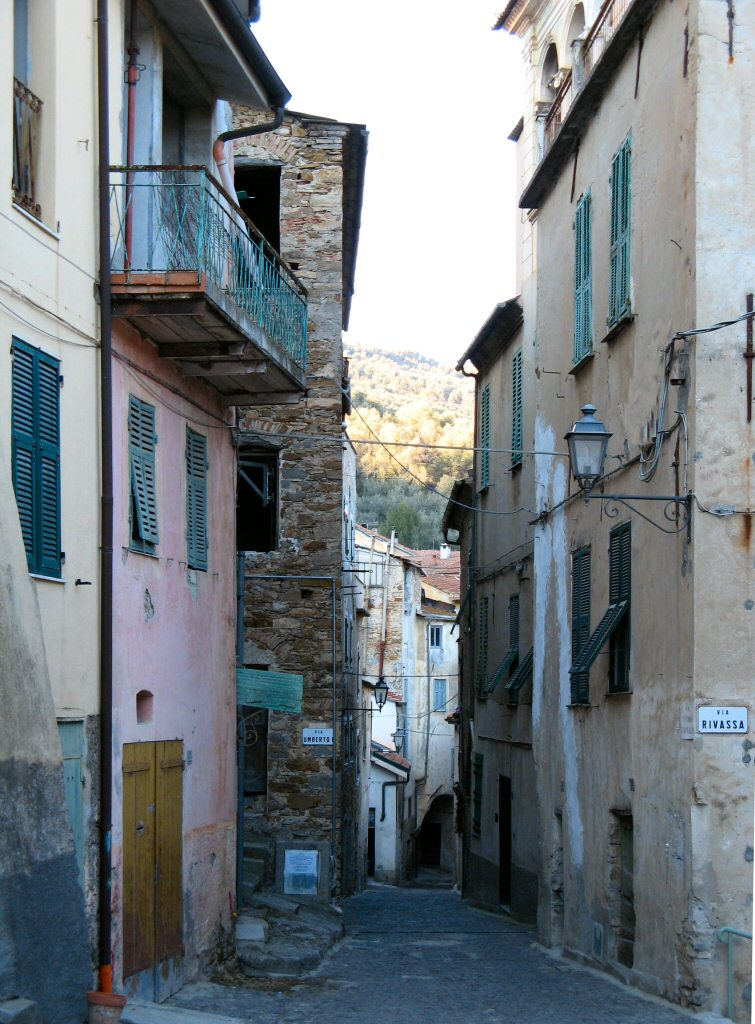
- Street in Imperia

- Flag Coat of arms

- Location of the province of Imperia in Italy
- Country: Italy
- Region: Liguria
- Capital(s): Imperia
- Municipalities: 66

Government
  - President: Claudio Scajola

Area
  - Total: 1,154.78 km^{2} (445.86 sq mi)

Population (2026)
  - Total: 209,848
  - Density: 181.721/km^{2} (470.656/sq mi)

GDP
  - Total: €5.024 billion (2015)
  - Per capita: €23,256 (2015)
- Time zone: UTC+1 (CET)
  - Summer (DST): UTC+2 (CEST)
- Postal code: 18010-18021, 18023-18028, 18030-18031, 18033, 18035, 18037, 18039, 18100
- Telephone prefix: 0183, 0184, 0196
- Vehicle registration: IM
- ISTAT code: 008

The province of Imperia (Italian: provincia di Imperia; Ligurian: provinsa d'Imperia; Occitan: província d'Impèria; French: province d'Imperia) is a mountainous and hilly province in the region of Liguria in northern Italy, situated between France to the north and the west, and the Ligurian Sea, an arm of the Mediterranean Sea to the south. Its capital is Imperia, though the largest city is Sanremo.

It has a population of 209,848 in an area of 1,154.78 square kilometres (445.86 sq mi) across its 66 municipalities.

== History ==
This stretch of coast shares much sentiment and history with the French coast, which as far as the Var just west of Nice was until 1860 a part of the northern Italian Kingdom of Sardinia and Savoy. Prehistoric cave remains were found near the French border at Balzi Rossi, although there is far more evidence of Roman civilisation. The coast road was the original Roman Via Aurelia and there are remains of a town including a Roman theatre near Ventimiglia. During the early Middle Ages until the 11th or 12th century, this part of the Ligurian coast was subject to various local lords such as the Doria and Grimaldi families and the Counts of Ventimiglia and Clavesana. Many hill-top villages date from this period when the coast was subject to raids from Saracen pirates and evidence of Saracen watchtowers can still be seen along the coast. It was only after this feudal period that Savoy and Genoa vied for control over this part of Liguria for over two centuries, in turn being replaced by French and Milanese dominance until the 16th century after which Genoa reasserted its control. During the years of Napoleon's French Empire, this coast became part of the French annexed 'Ligurian Republic'. Indeed, It is believed that Napoleon over-nighted in Imperia during his Italian campaign. The overthrow of Napoleon eventually led to this coast reverting to the House of Savoy and the Kingdom of Sardinia.

With its close proximity to France, the province of Imperia is often viewed as just a continuation of the French Riviera and this stretch of coast is often referred to as the Italian Riviera. However, many historians claim that the Imperia resorts of Sanremo (also referred to incorrectly as San Remo), Bordighera and Ospedaletti (plus Alassio which is found in the adjoining province of Savona) formed the world's first 'Riviera', predating and originally outshining today's far more glitzy Côte d'Azur or French Riviera.

In the 19th century, these resorts became very popular with wealthy Europeans, especially the British who can lay claim to starting the local tourism industry. It is claimed Britain's Queen Victoria once stayed on this coast and at one time there were large communities of resident British and Russian aristocrats who favoured the mild winter climate. Amongst those who lived on this coast are Queen Margherita of Savoy who lived in Bordighera, Alfred Nobel who died in Sanremo, the Russian Tsarina Maria Alexandrovna (Marie of Hesse), Tchaikovsky who wrote his Eugene Onegin in Sanremo, Claude Monet who painted around Bordighera and finally Grock the famed Swiss clown who died in Imperia. These resorts remained popular with the British until the mid-20th century when Spain became more favoured.

Today there are few remnants of these communities although traces of its past can be found in the Villa Hanbury (or Giardini Botanici Hanbury) near the French border, famed for its tropical and sub-tropical gardens founded by Sir Thomas Hanbury. Other examples are the Russian Orthodox church in Sanremo and the Villa Grock in Imperia.

Nowadays, the term "Italian Riviera" is used for the whole Ligurian coast as far east as La Spezia, so it is more accurate to refer to the coast of the Imperia province as the Riviera dei Fiori (or Riviera of Flowers). It takes this name from the exotic flora and important flower-growing industry centred on the Sanremo and Ventimiglia flower markets.

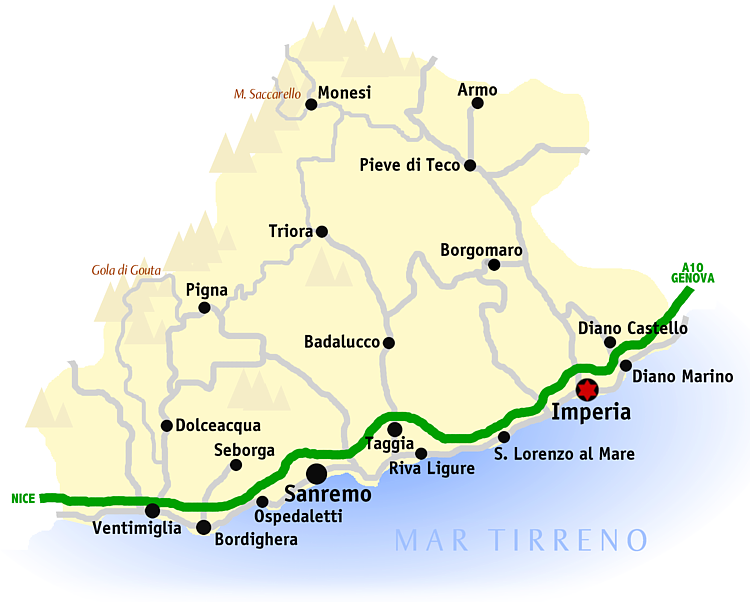
Map of the province of Imperia

== Geography ==
To the east lies the Italian province of Savona while its western edge forms part of Italy's frontier with France (the département of Alpes-Maritimes) and it shares its northern border with the Piedmontese province of Cuneo. The mountain chain to the north of the province has several peaks above 1,600 metres (5,200 ft), with some peaks on the French border above 2,000 metres (6,600 ft) such as Monte Saccarello at 2,200 metres (7,200 ft). Ranges of hills run down to the coast in a generally north–south direction, in effect making the province of Imperia a succession of hills and valleys ending at the coast in rocky headlands and small pebbly bays. Each valley tends to have its own seasonal river or torrential stream and only one valley can lay claim to a year-round river - the River Roia (or Roya in French) whose upper stretches are within France. This coast is in an earthquake zone and the deserted ruins of Baiardo and Bussana Vecchia are reminders of the 1887 earthquake. Bussana has become the haunt of hippies and artists.

== Government ==
=== Municipalities ===
The province has 66 municipalities:

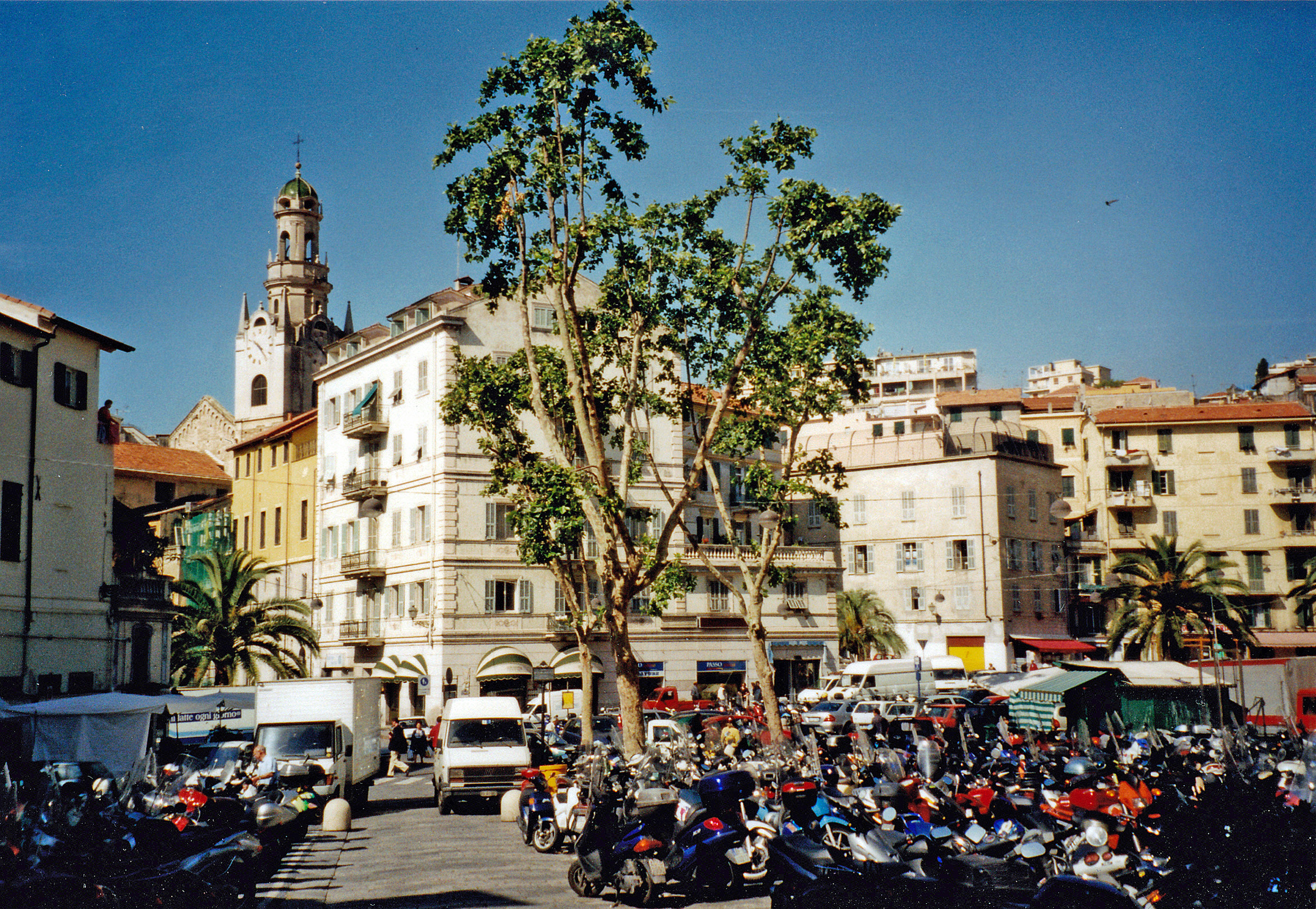
Sanremo

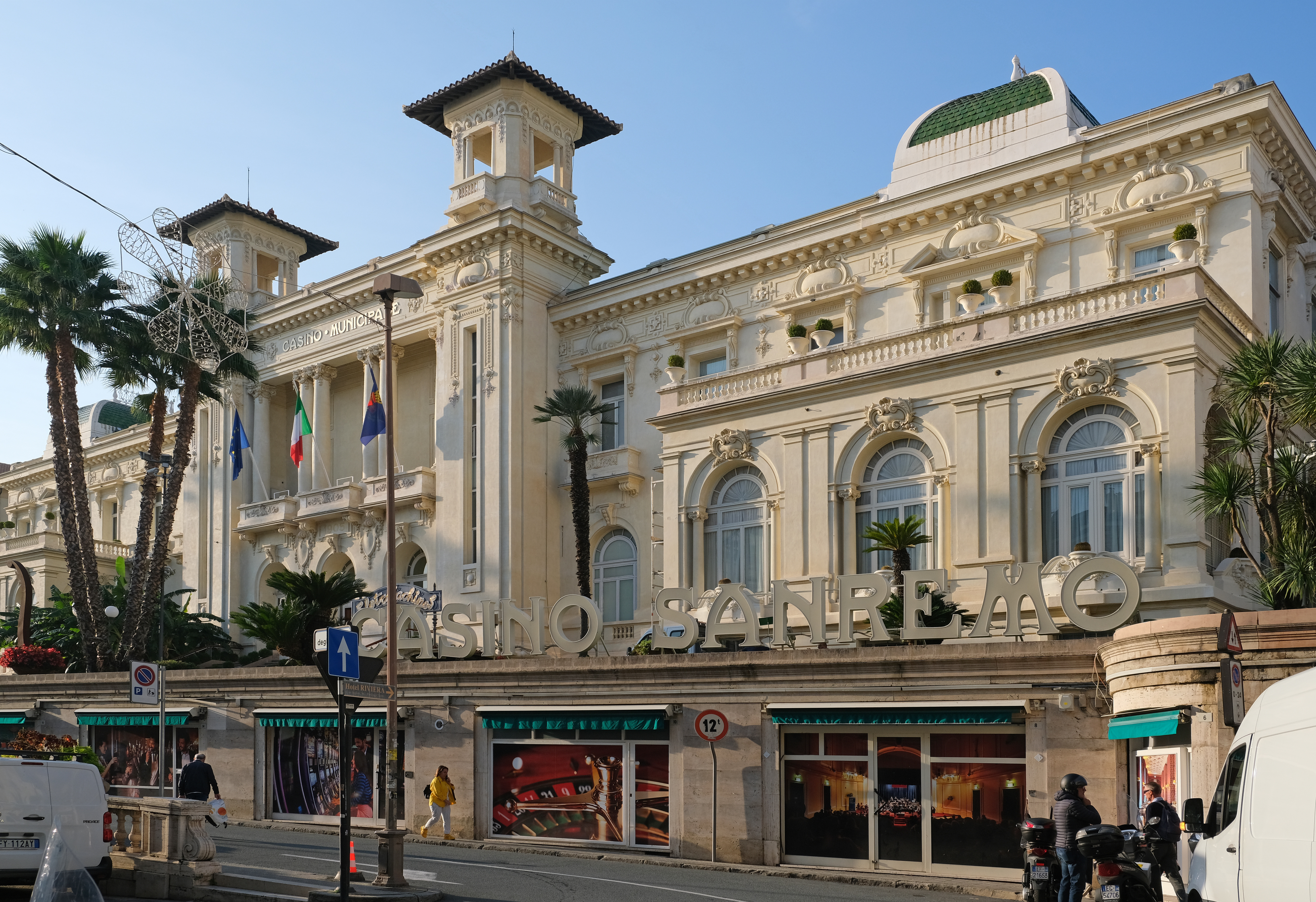
Sanremo Casino

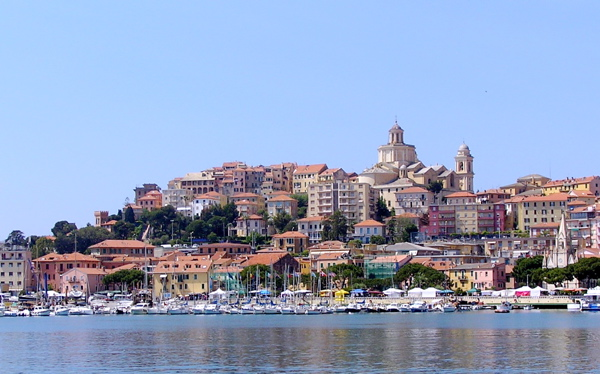
Imperia

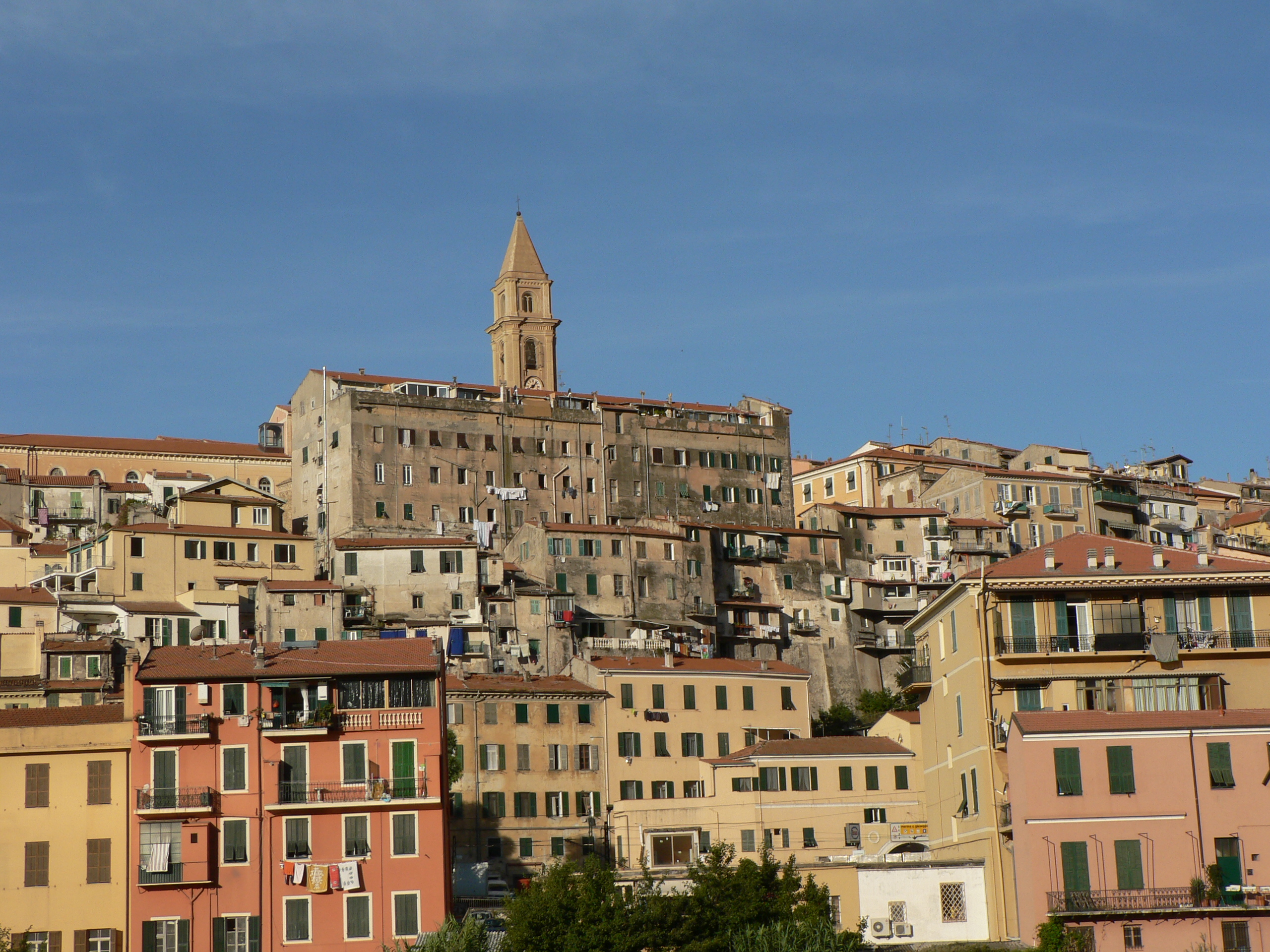
Ventimiglia

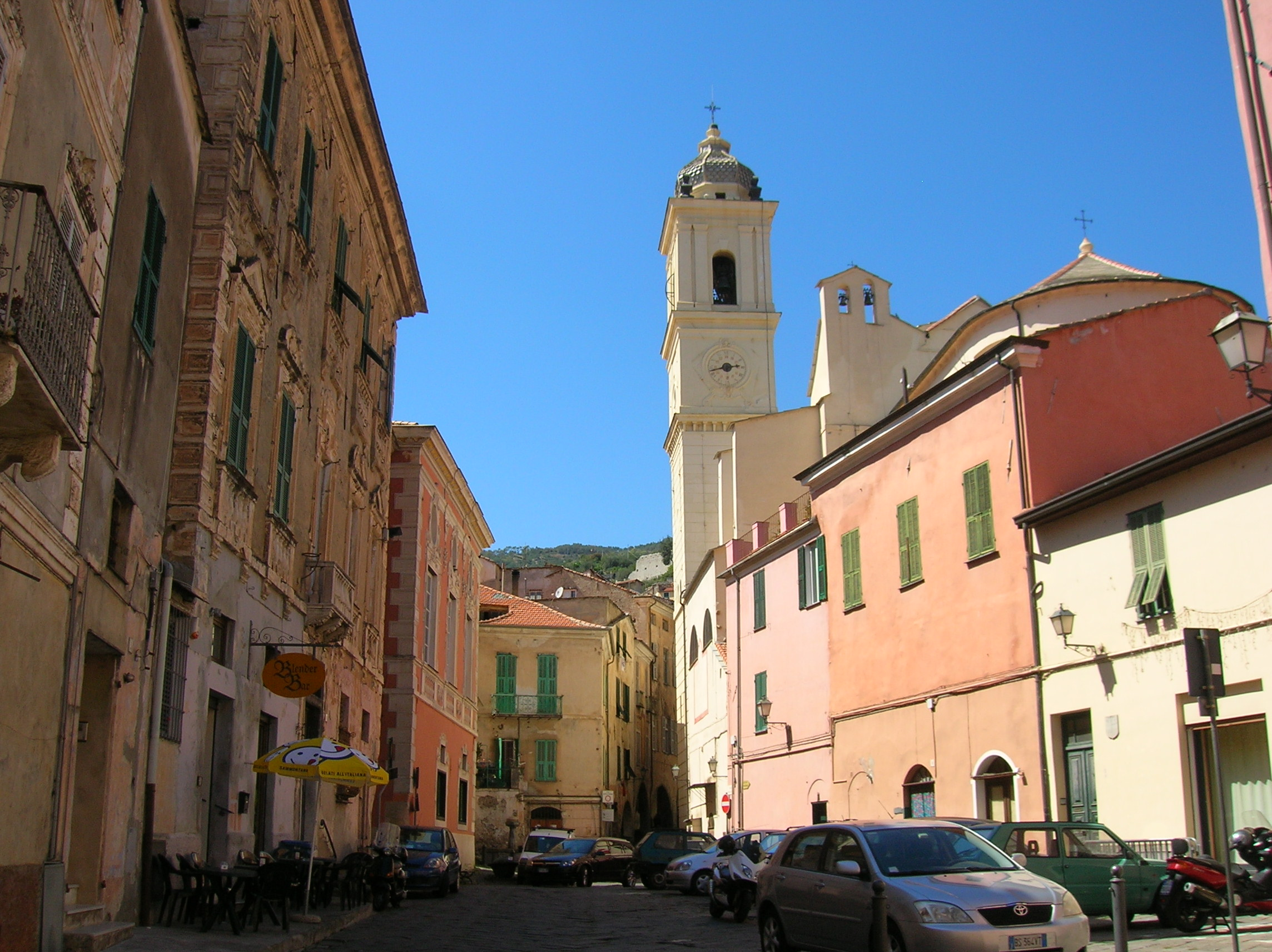
Taggia

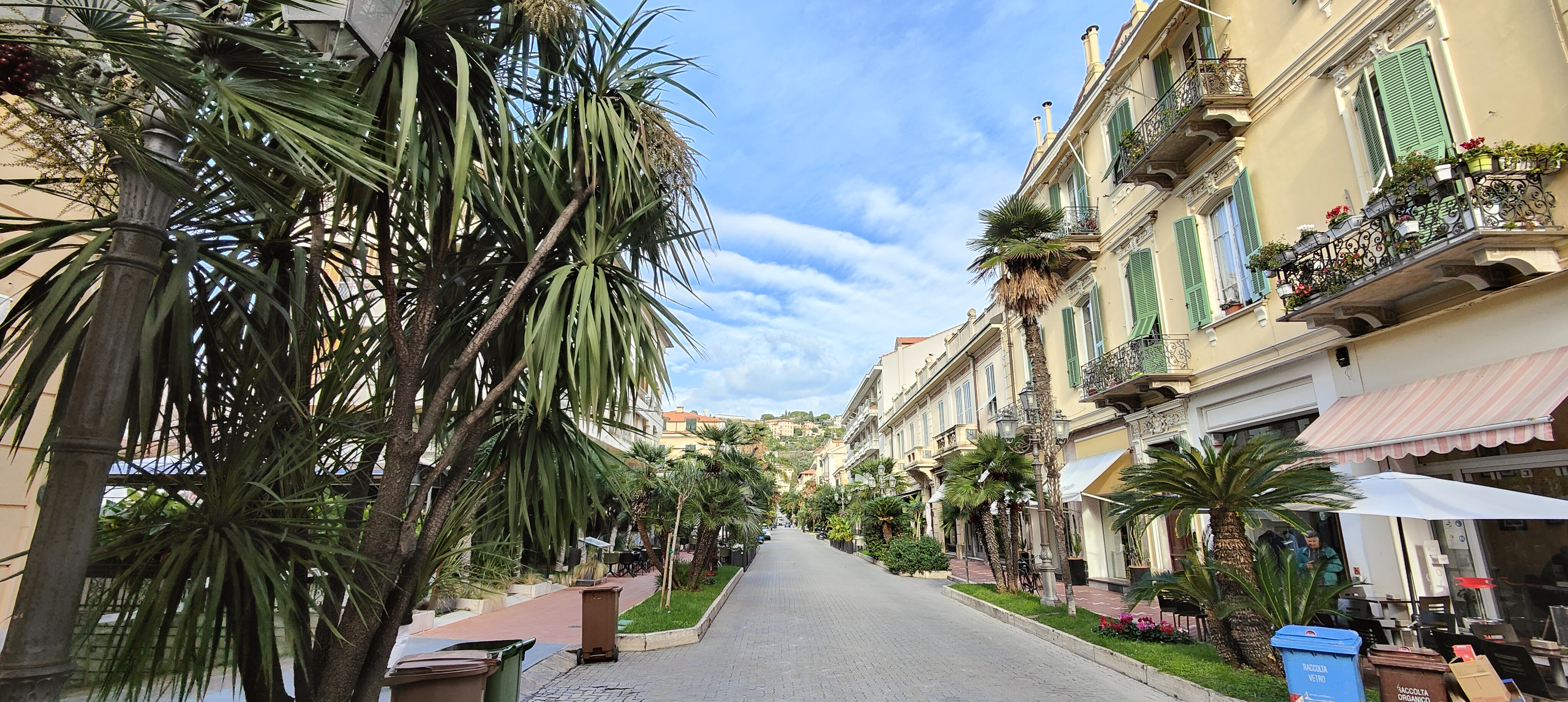
Bordighera

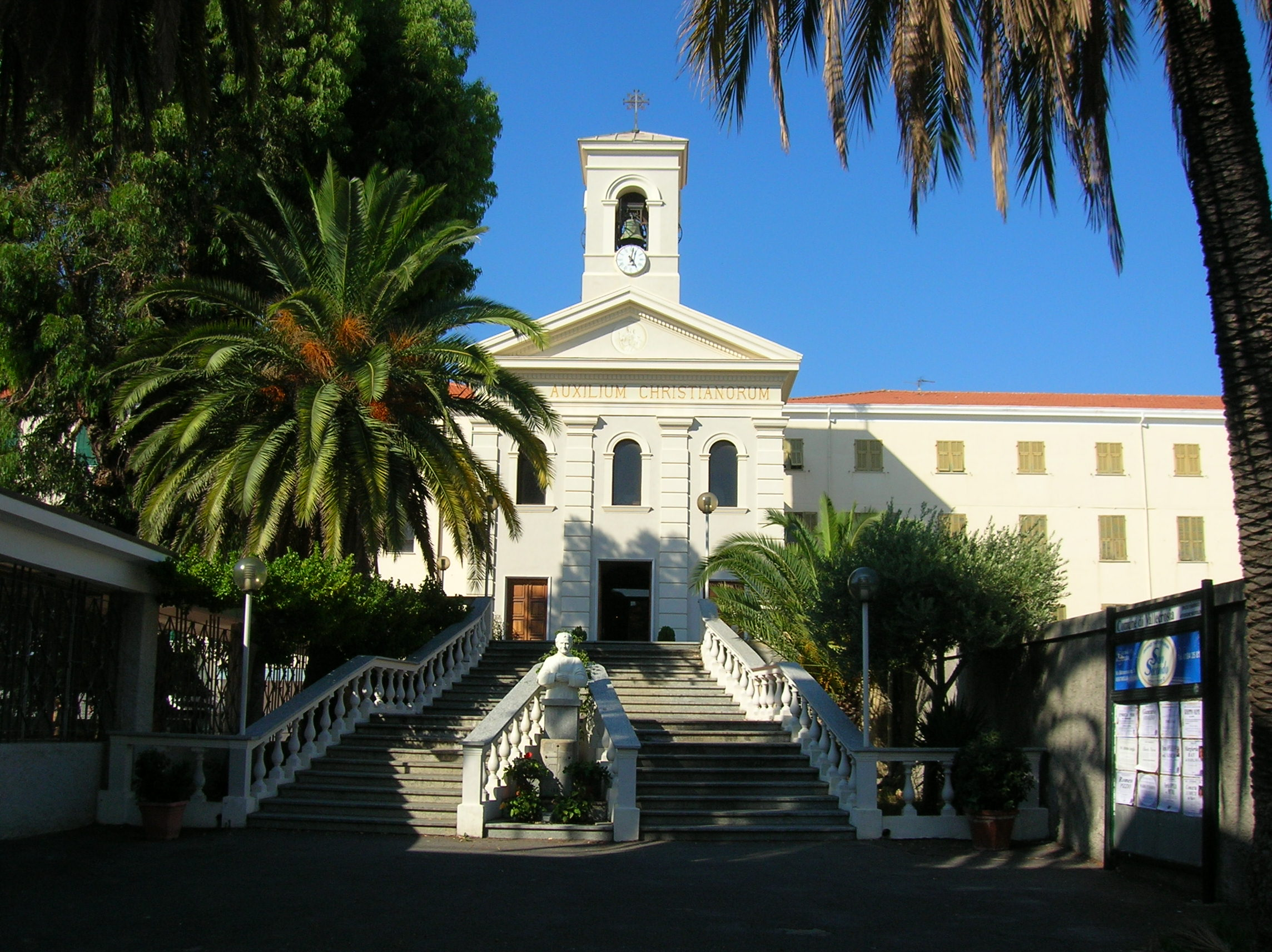
Vallecrosia

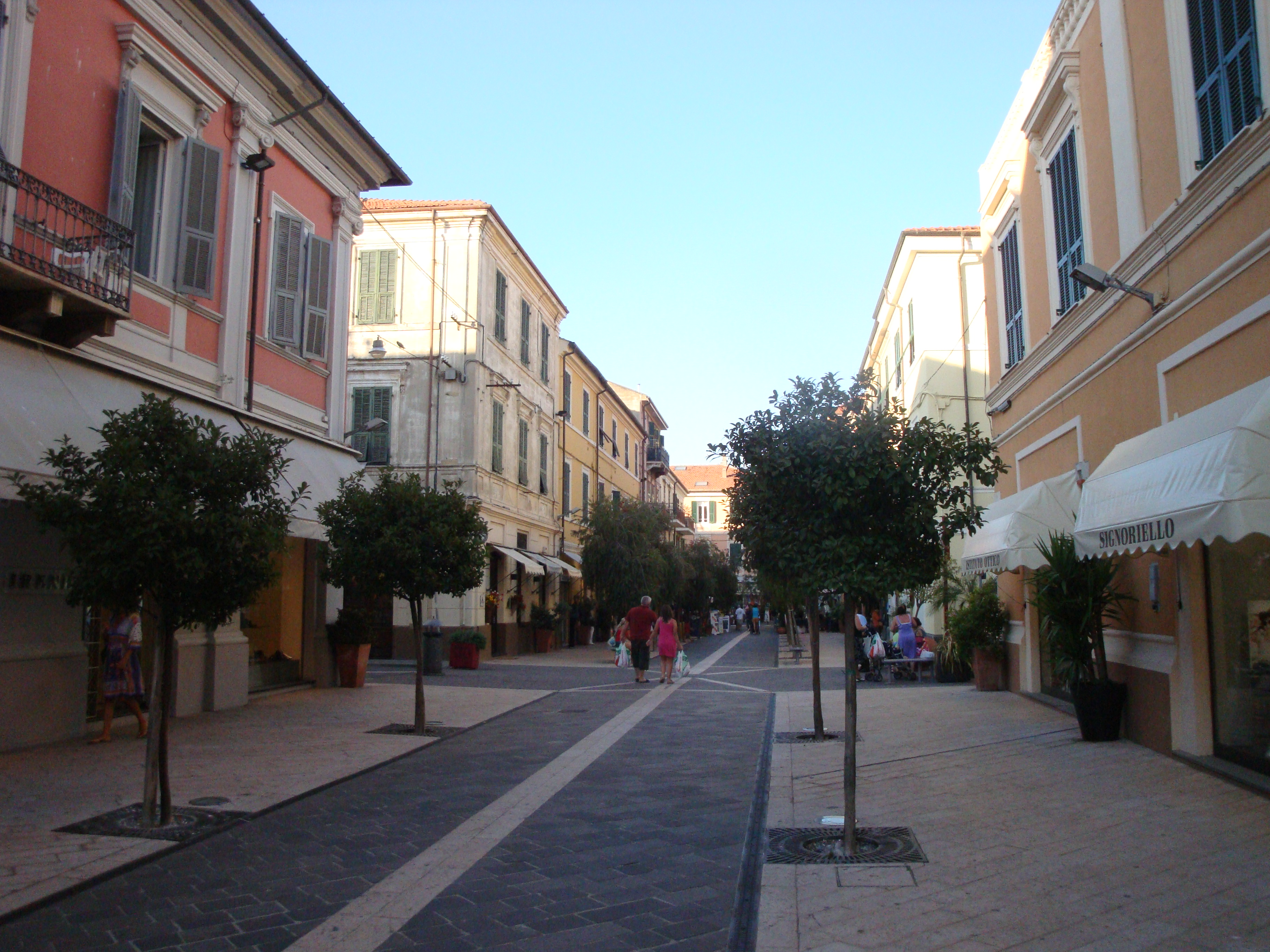
Diano Marina

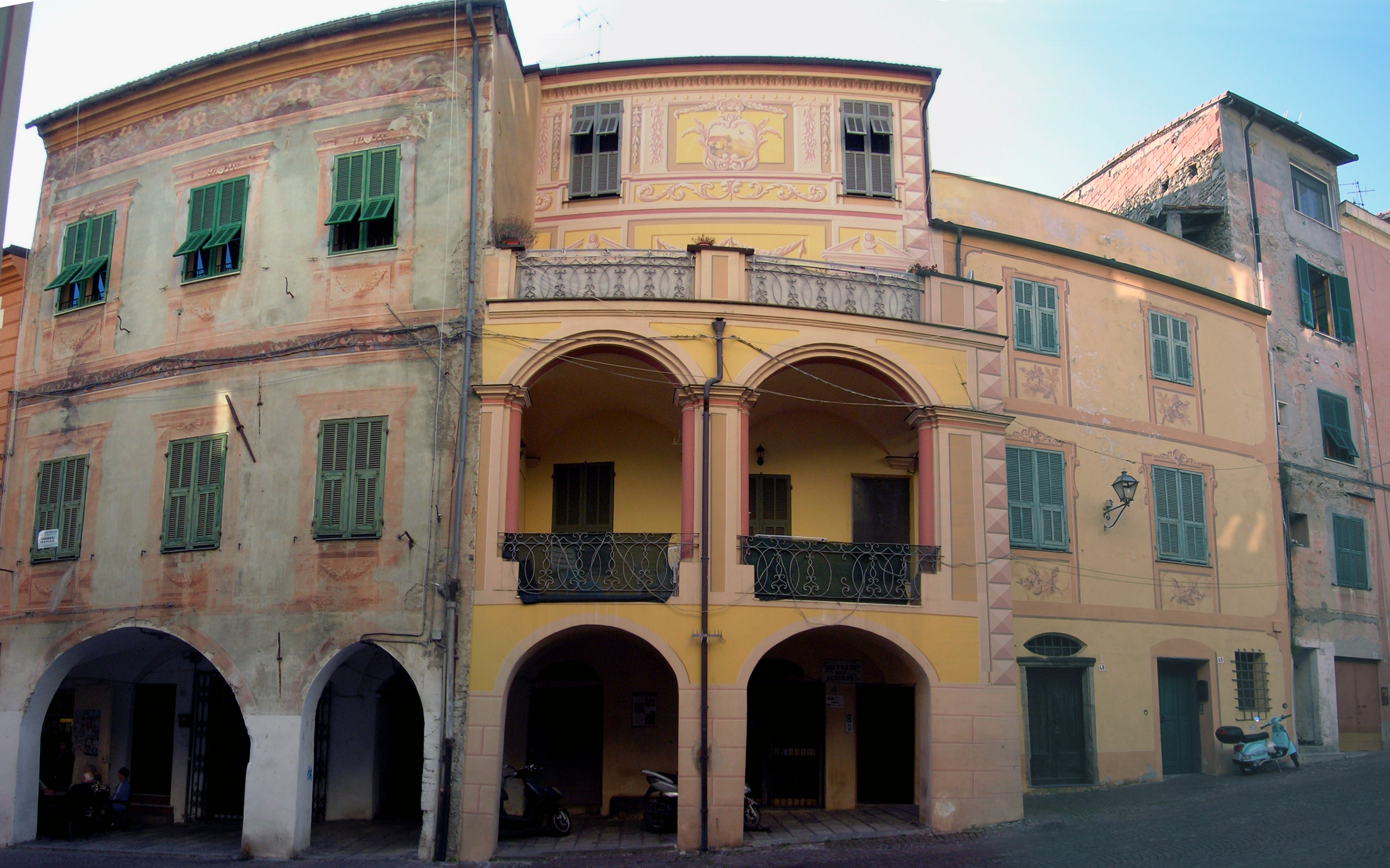
Vallecrosia

- Airole
- Apricale
- Aquila d'Arroscia
- Armo
- Aurigo
- Badalucco
- Bajardo
- Bordighera
- Borghetto d'Arroscia
- Borgomaro
- Camporosso
- Caravonica
- Castel Vittorio
- Castellaro
- Ceriana
- Cervo
- Cesio
- Chiusanico
- Chiusavecchia
- Cipressa
- Civezza
- Cosio d'Arroscia
- Costarainera
- Diano Arentino
- Diano Castello
- Diano Marina
- Diano San Pietro
- Dolceacqua
- Dolcedo
- Imperia
- Isolabona
- Lucinasco
- Mendatica
- Molini di Triora
- Montalto Carpasio
- Montegrosso Pian Latte
- Olivetta San Michele
- Ospedaletti
- Perinaldo
- Pietrabruna
- Pieve di Teco
- Pigna
- Pompeiana
- Pontedassio
- Pornassio
- Prelà
- Ranzo
- Rezzo
- Riva Ligure
- Rocchetta Nervina
- San Bartolomeo al Mare
- San Biagio della Cima
- San Lorenzo al Mare
- Sanremo
- Santo Stefano al Mare
- Seborga
- Soldano
- Taggia
- Terzorio
- Triora
- Vallebona
- Vallecrosia
- Vasia
- Ventimiglia
- Vessalico
- Villa Faraldi

== Demographics ==
As of 2026, the population is 209,848, of which 48.8% are male, and 51.2% are female. Minors make up 13.1% of the population, and seniors make up 28.9%.

Historical population

Year	Pop.	±%
1861	129,408	—
1871	132,715	+2.6%
1881	138,753	+4.5%
1901	144,456	+4.1%
1911	155,063	+7.3%
1921	154,306	−0.5%
1931	158,116	+2.5%
1936	158,470	+0.2%

Year	Pop.	±%
1951	166,978	+5.4%
1961	202,160	+21.1%
1971	225,127	+11.4%
1981	223,738	−0.6%
1991	213,587	−4.5%
2001	205,238	−3.9%
2011	214,502	+4.5%
2021	208,670	−2.7%

Source: ISTAT

=== Immigration ===
As of 2025, immigrants make up 18.5% of the population. The 5 largest foreign countries of birth are Albania, Morocco, France, Romania, and Peru.

== Culture ==
As well as sharing a common history, the local Ligurian language dialect of Imperia province is a mix of French and Italian, the architecture and cuisine also show many Italianate similarities. Pasta, fish, seafood, game, vegetables, herbs, nuts and fruit are all mainstays of the diet. Menton in France and Ventimiglia in Italy claim to be the first international joint-community. This coast even has its own princely version of the French Riviera's Principality of Monaco: Seborga near Ospedaletti claims an unrecognised and much-humoured independence from Italy dating back to the early feudal era.

Although there are few examples of Renaissance or Baroque architecture in this part of Italy, most coastal towns and many hill-top villages still exhibit picturesque old quarters dating from the Middle Ages. There has been much development during the 20th century. In general, the coastal strip has become over-populated while inland villages are steadily becoming depopulated.

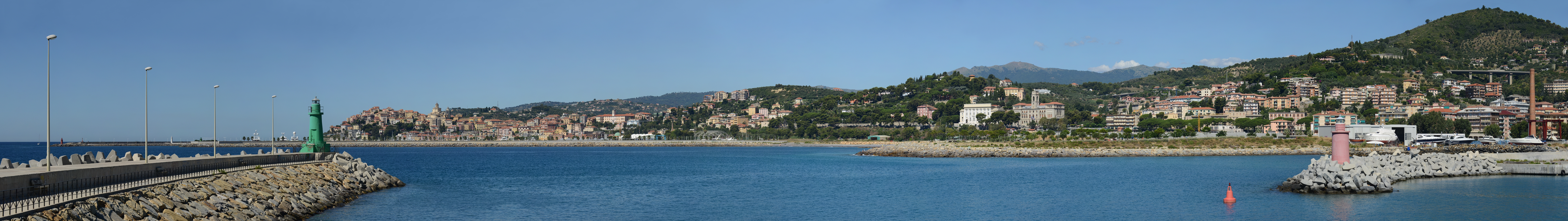
View of Porto Maurizio and easternmost Oneglia from the sea

== Economy ==
There are several ports and marinas along the coast including Sanremo and Imperia, although fishing boats have given way to pleasure craft of the rich. Tourism is still very important today, but apart from flower growing, olive cultivation and oil pressing are important mainstays around the city of Imperia. Sanremo is the tourist capital and chic-est and largest resort on this coast. As well as a Casino, Sanremo is home to the Sanremo Music Festival, a TV event in Italy. Bordighera supplies palms to the Vatican for Palm Sunday.

== Transport ==
Notwithstanding the terrain, the main communications infrastructure runs east–west along the coast. Several international express trains serve this coast while the motorway is characterised by many tunnels and viaducts. The nearest international airport is Nice Côte d'Azur Airport in France.
