= Costarainera =

Costarainera A Costarainea
- Comune
- Comune di Costarainera
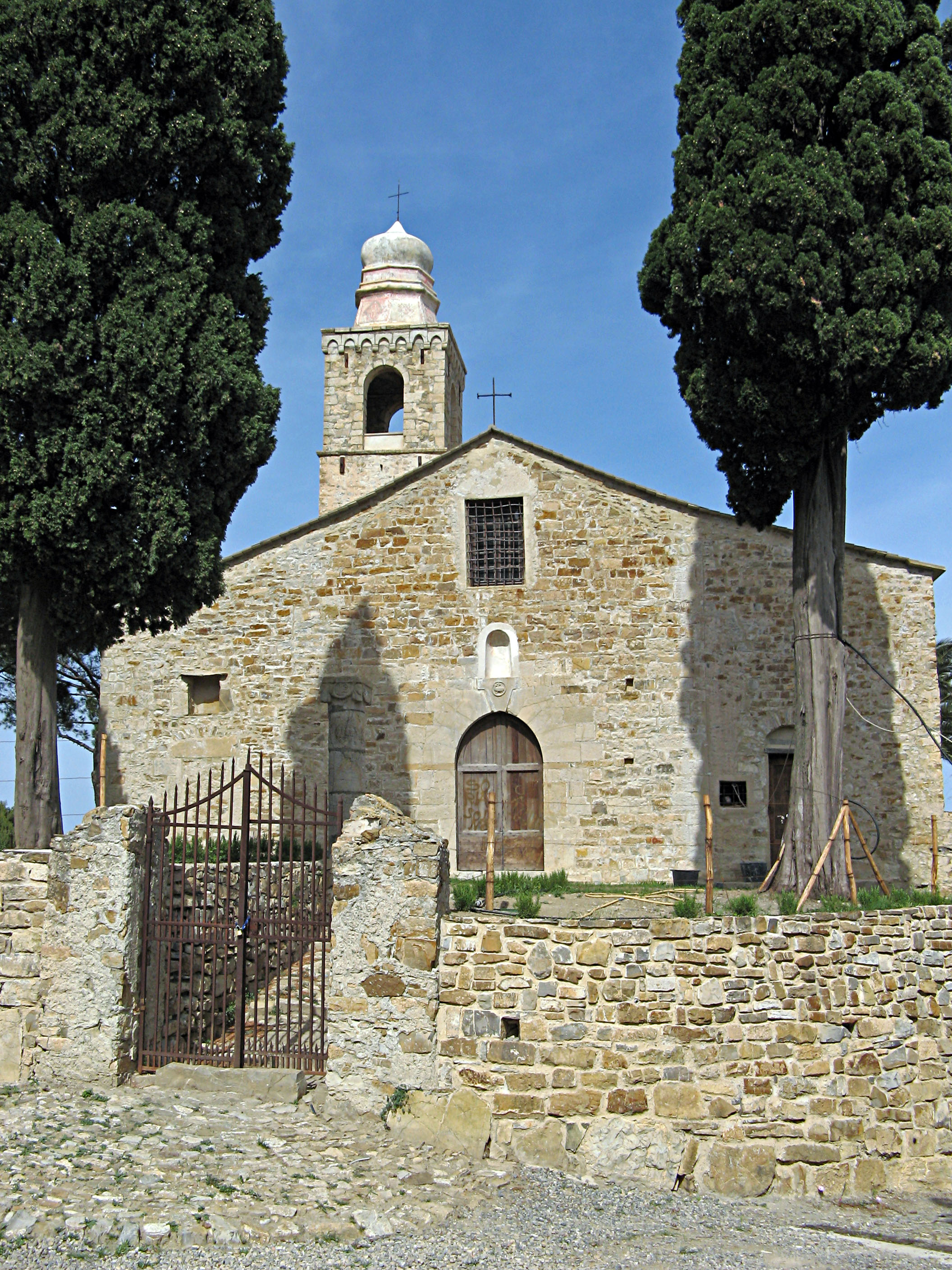
- Saint Anthony Church in Costarainera

- Location within Italy Location within Liguria
- Coordinates: 43°51′N 7°56′E
- Country: Italy
- Region: Liguria
- Province: Province of Imperia (IM)

Area
  - Total: 2.4 km^{2} (0.93 sq mi)

Population (Dec. 2004)
  - Total: 775
  - Density: 320/km^{2} (840/sq mi)
- Time zone: UTC+1 (CET)
  - Summer (DST): UTC+2 (CEST)
- Postal code: 18017
- Dialing code: 0183

Costarainera (Ligurian: A Costarainea) is a comune (municipality) in the Province of Imperia in the Italian region Liguria, located about 100 kilometres (62 mi) southwest of Genoa and about 9 kilometres (6 mi) southwest of Imperia. As of 31 December 2004, it had a population of 775 and an area of 2.4 square kilometres (0.93 mi^{2}).

Costarainera borders the following municipalities: Cipressa and San Lorenzo al Mare.

== Demographic evolution ==
Historical population

Year	Pop.	±%
1861	611	—
1871	453	−25.9%
1881	347	−23.4%
1901	314	−9.5%
1911	270	−14.0%

Year	Pop.	±%
1921	295	+9.3%
1931	238	−19.3%
1936	342	+43.7%
1951	405	+18.4%
1961	595	+46.9%

Year	Pop.	±%
1971	603	+1.3%
1981	579	−4.0%
1991	639	+10.4%
2001	718	+12.4%

Source: Data from ISTAT
