= Perinaldo =

Perinaldo Pȓeiñaudu/Preinoud
- Comune
- Comune di Perinaldo
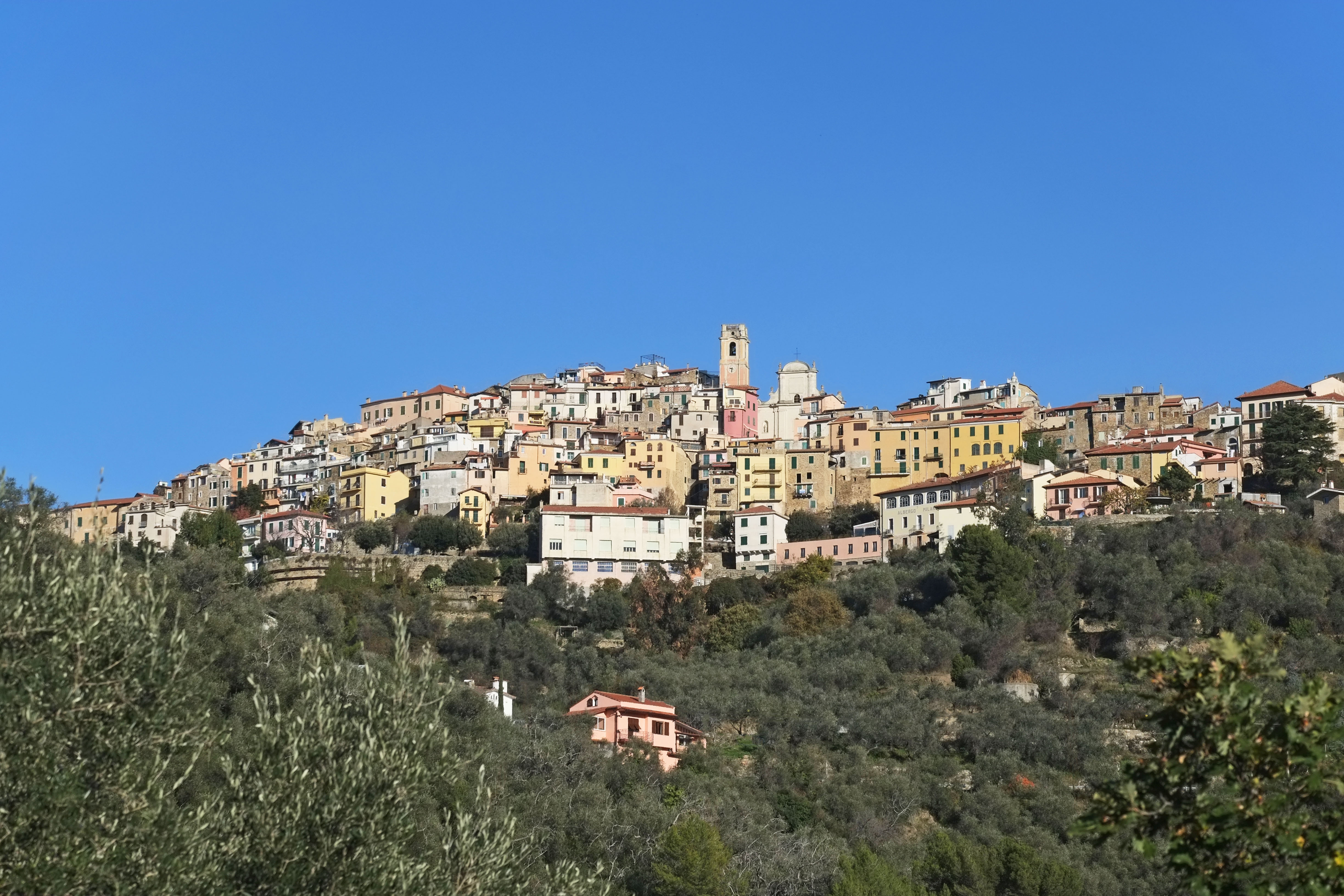
- The village of Perinaldo in Autumn.

- Coat of arms

- Location within Italy Location within Liguria
- Coordinates: 43°51′N 7°40′E
- Country: Italy
- Region: Liguria
- Province: Imperia (IM)
- Frazioni: Negi, Suseneo

Government
  - Mayor: Patrizia Guglielmi

Area
  - Total: 21.0 km^{2} (8.1 sq mi)
- Elevation: 572 m (1,877 ft)

Population (31 December 2007)
  - Total: 918
  - Density: 43.7/km^{2} (113/sq mi)
- Demonym: Perinaldesi
- Time zone: UTC+1 (CET)
  - Summer (DST): UTC+2 (CEST)
- Postal code: 18032
- Dialing code: 0184
- Website: Official website

Perinaldo (Ligurian: Pȓeiñaudu, Preinoud) is a comune (municipality) in the Province of Imperia in the Italian region of Liguria, located about 120 kilometres (75 mi) southwest of Genoa and about 30 kilometres (19 mi) west of Imperia.

It is one of I Borghi più belli d'Italia ("The most beautiful villages of Italy"). It is the birthplace of the 17th-century Italian naturalised French astronomer Giovanni Domenico Cassini.

== Main sights ==
- Parish church of San Nicola da Bari, built in 1489. It houses a 15th-century wooden crucifix.
- Church of Sant'Antonio abate (1590–1600)
- Sanctuary of the Visitation (17th century)
- Astronomical observatory

== Twin towns ==
- Tourves, France, since 1993
- Buey Arriba, Cuba
