= Bajardo =

- Comune
- Comune di Bajardo
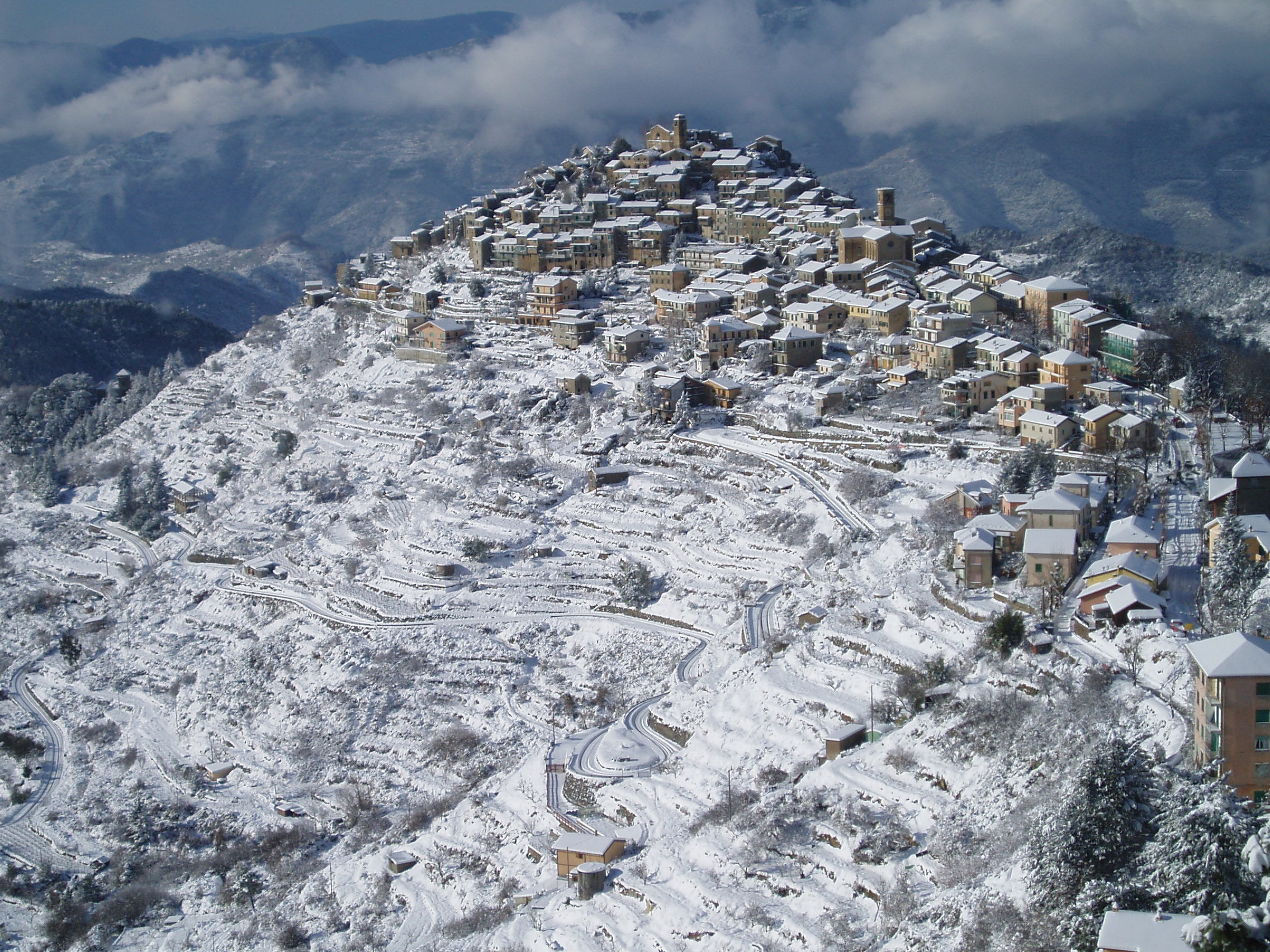
- Bajardo under the January snow.

- Coat of arms

- Location within Italy Location within Liguria
- Coordinates: 43°54′N 7°43′E
- Country: Italy
- Region: Liguria
- Province: Imperia (IM)
- Frazioni: Berzi, Vignai

Government
  - Mayor: Francesca Laura

Area
  - Total: 24.54 km^{2} (9.47 sq mi)
- Elevation: 900 m (3,000 ft)

Population (28 February 2017)
  - Total: 333
  - Density: 13.6/km^{2} (35.1/sq mi)
- Demonym: Baiardesi or Bajocchi
- Time zone: UTC+1 (CET)
  - Summer (DST): UTC+2 (CEST)
- Postal code: 18031
- Dialing code: 0184
- Patron saint: Saint Nicholas of Bari
- Website: Official website

Bajardo (also Baiardo) (Ligurian: Baiardu) is a comune in the Province of Imperia in the Italian region Liguria. It is about 110 kilometres (68 mi) southwest of Genoa and about 25 kilometres (16 mi) west of Imperia.

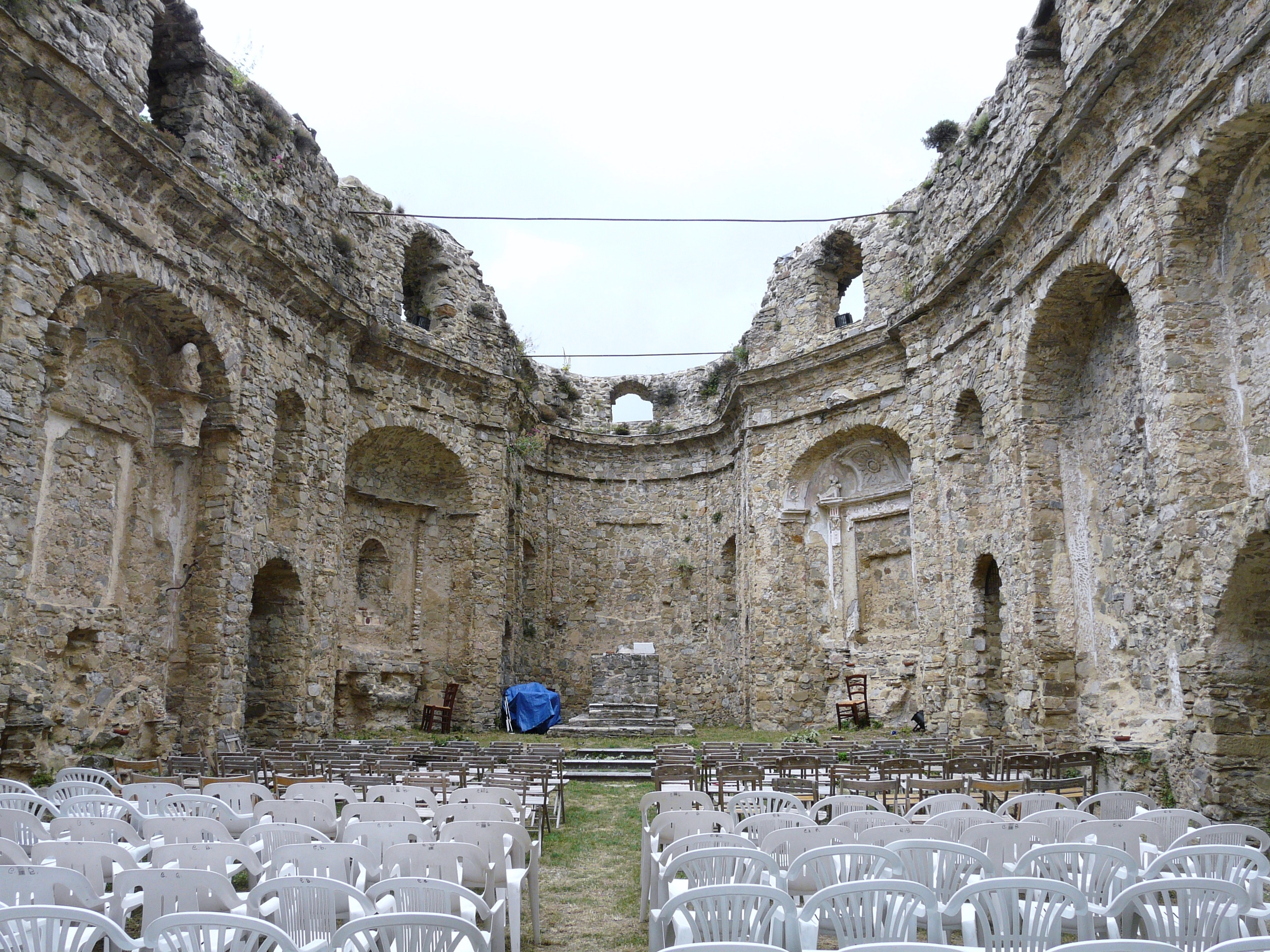
The remains of the old church of San Nicolò.

Its principal settlement, Bajardo itself, is a medieval village which stands at an elevation of 900 metres (3,000 ft) on a peak at the head of the basin of the Nervia torrent.

== History ==
First ruled by the Counts of Ventimiglia, it passed to the Marquis of Ceva before coming under Genoese control in 1259. It remained with Genoa until 1815 when it became part of the Kingdom of Sardinia. The parish church of San Nicolò da Bari in Piazza Parrocchiale was built in 1893 to replace the church destroyed by the earthquake of 1887.
