= Brös =

Italian preparation of cheese and grappa

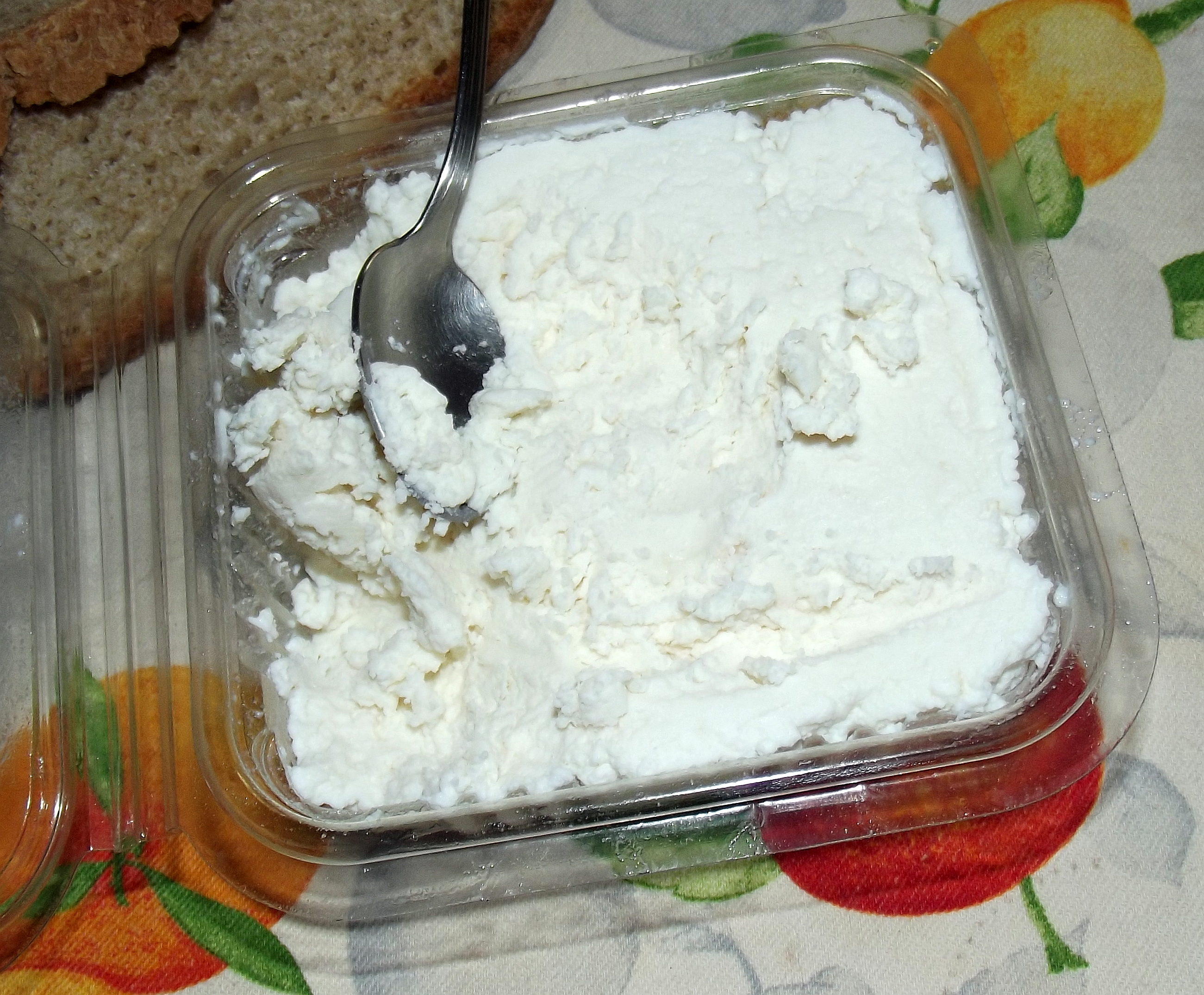
Bruss from Liguria (Mendatica) packed in a plastic bowl

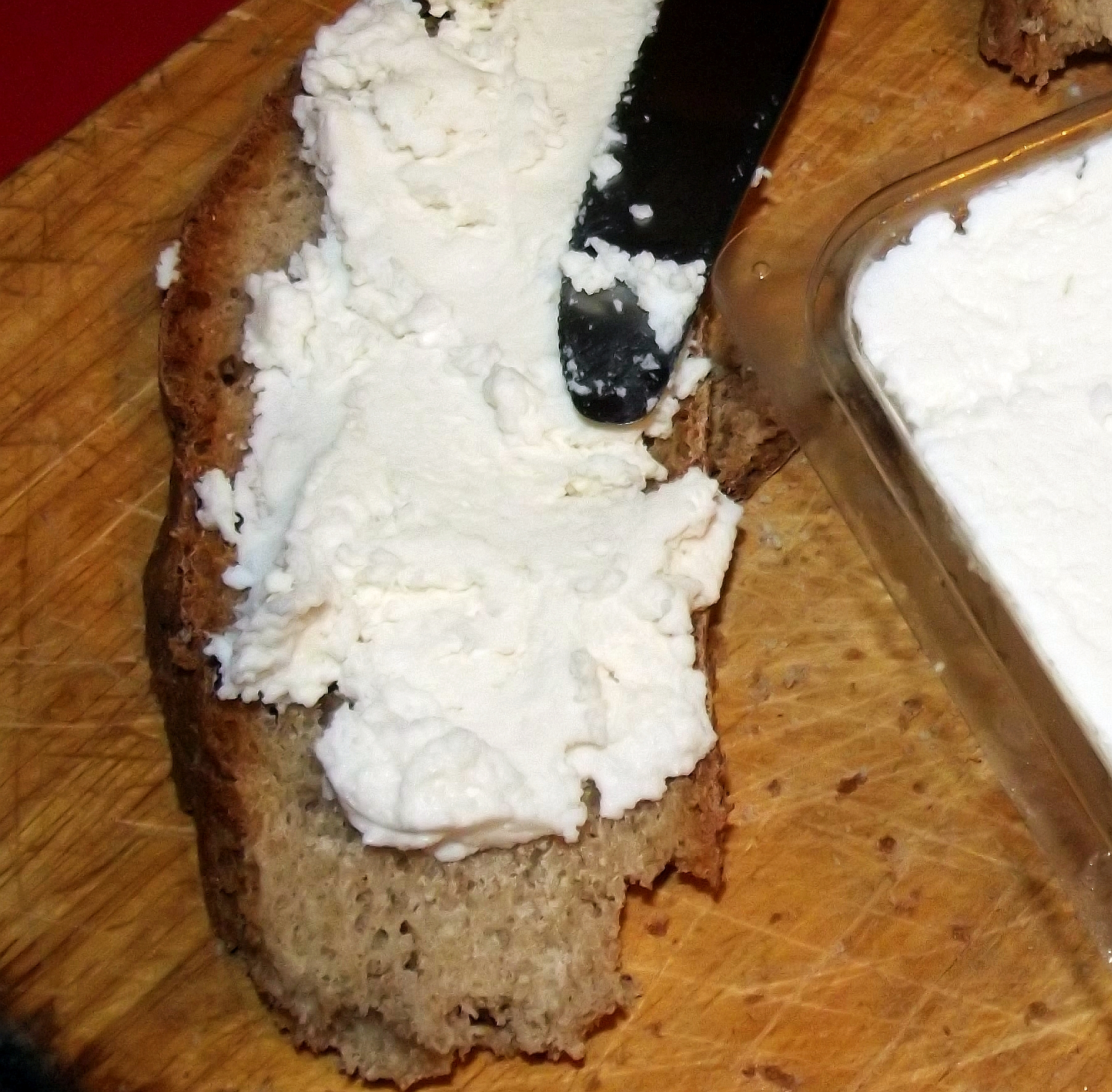
Bruss on a Triora bread slice

Brös (also Bros, Bross, Brus or Bruss) is a Piedmontese and Ligurian preparation of cheese and grappa which, in former centuries, was typical of the peasant cuisine of the Upper Langa and West Liguria. Its pungent flavour gave rise to the proverb “Only love is stronger than Brös”. It has been conjectured that its name derives from Bresse.

== History ==
The antiquity of this speciality is unknown, although it was probably well-established before the beginning of the nineteenth century when Vittorio di Sant’Albino described it in his Piedmontese-Italian dictionary. The original motivation was the avoidance of waste: pieces of stale, hard and/or mouldy cheese were mixed with homemade grappa (the distillate of the pomace remaining from winemaking) plus, perhaps, butter and spices, and left to ferment in an earthenware container until the mixture acquired a creamy texture. At this point it was covered and could be treated as a preserve.

Brös has acquired a certain cachet in recent years, and may often be found in the restaurants of the Langhe. However the robust traditional formulation has been largely replaced by one based on fresh cheeses such as Robiola and white wine.

== Similarities ==
Brus da ricotta is a version without wine or grappa which is made in various parts of Piedmont by fermenting sheep's milk ricotta cheese for a month or more, and aromatizing with chilli or black pepper. It has been recognized as a “traditional Piedmontese product” by the regional government.

Bruzzu is similar non-alcoholic product based this time on ewes’ milk ricotta and produced in the communes of Triora, Molini di Triora and Cosio di Arroscia in the Province of Imperia, western Liguria. The cheese is referred to by the government enquiry into agriculture chaired by Stefano Jacini in 1877–1882 and remained very popular until the 1990s. In the first decade of the twenty-first century it enjoyed something of a revival and was included in the Ark of Taste catalogue of heritage foods. The ricotta is placed in moulds to drain and then transferred to wooden vats to ferment, usually with the addition of salt. The cheeses are ready to eat after being aged for about a week in the cellar. They come in various sizes, are creamy in texture, and are ivory or brownish-white in colour.

== See also ==
- Piedmontese cheeses
- Piedmontese cuisine
- Cuisine of Liguria
- List of Italian dishes
