= Passo Garlenda =

Mountain pass in Italy

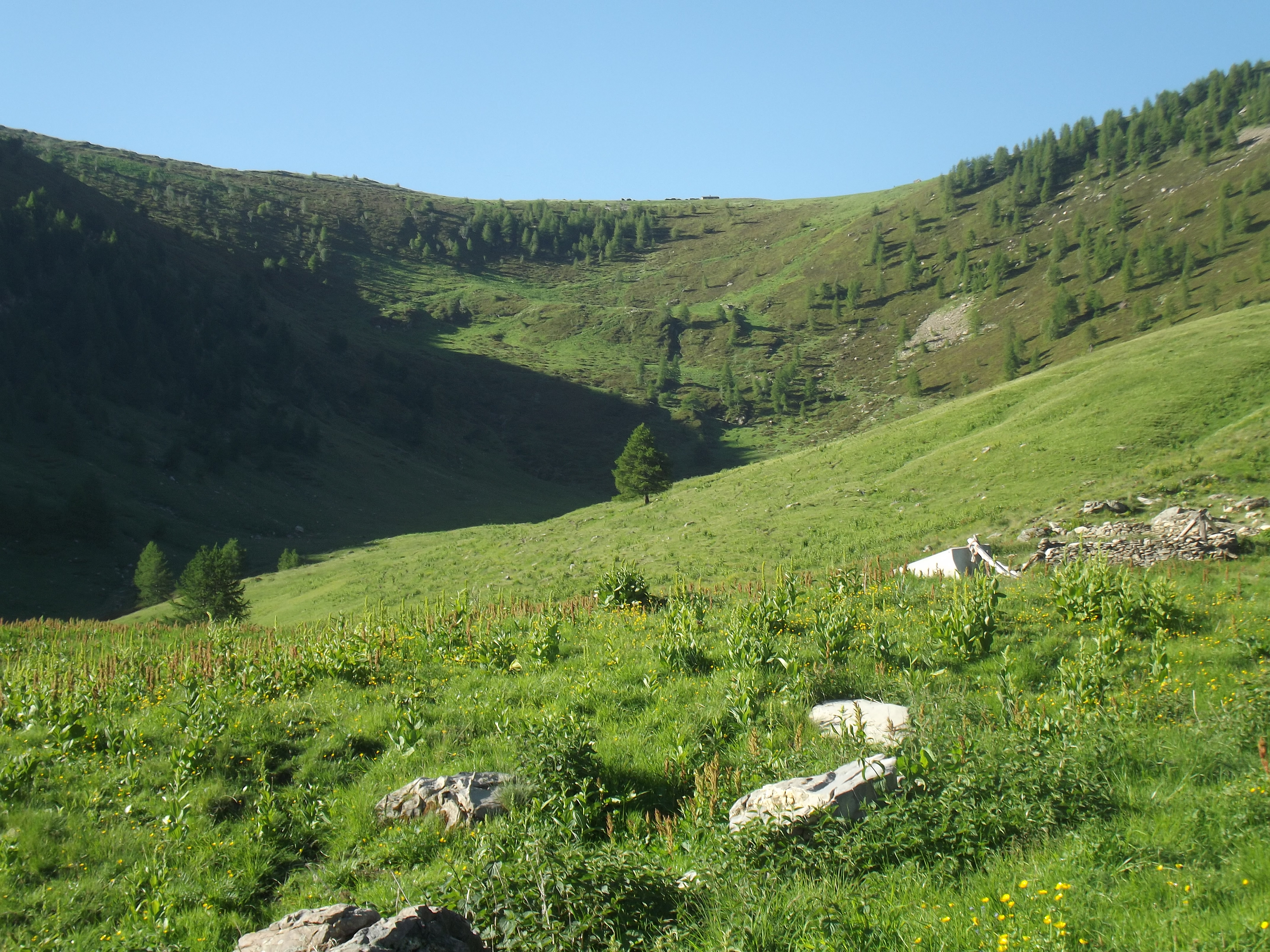
- Passo Garlenda from Tanaro valley

- Location within Alps
- Elevation: 2,021 metres (6,631 ft)
- Traversed by: Alta Via dei Monti Liguri

Third Approach
- Location: Liguria, Italy
- Range: Ligurian Alps
- Coordinates: 44°03′03″N 7°44′53″E

Passo Garlenda or Passo di Garlenda(2021 m) is a mountain pass in the Province of Imperia (Italy). It connects Verdeggia, located in the Argentina Valley, with Monesi di Triora, located in Tanaro Valley.

== Geography ==
Passo Garlenda is located on the main chain of the Alps between Monte Frontè (2152 m) and Monte Cimonasso (2078 m). Near the pass there are some ruins of old barraks.

== Hiking ==
The pass is accessible by off-road mountain paths coming from the nearby valleys and is crossed by the Alta Via dei Monti Liguri, a long-distance trail from Ventimiglia (province of Imperia) to Bolano (province of La Spezia).

== Mountain huts ==
- Rifugio Sanremo (2,054 m)

== See also ==
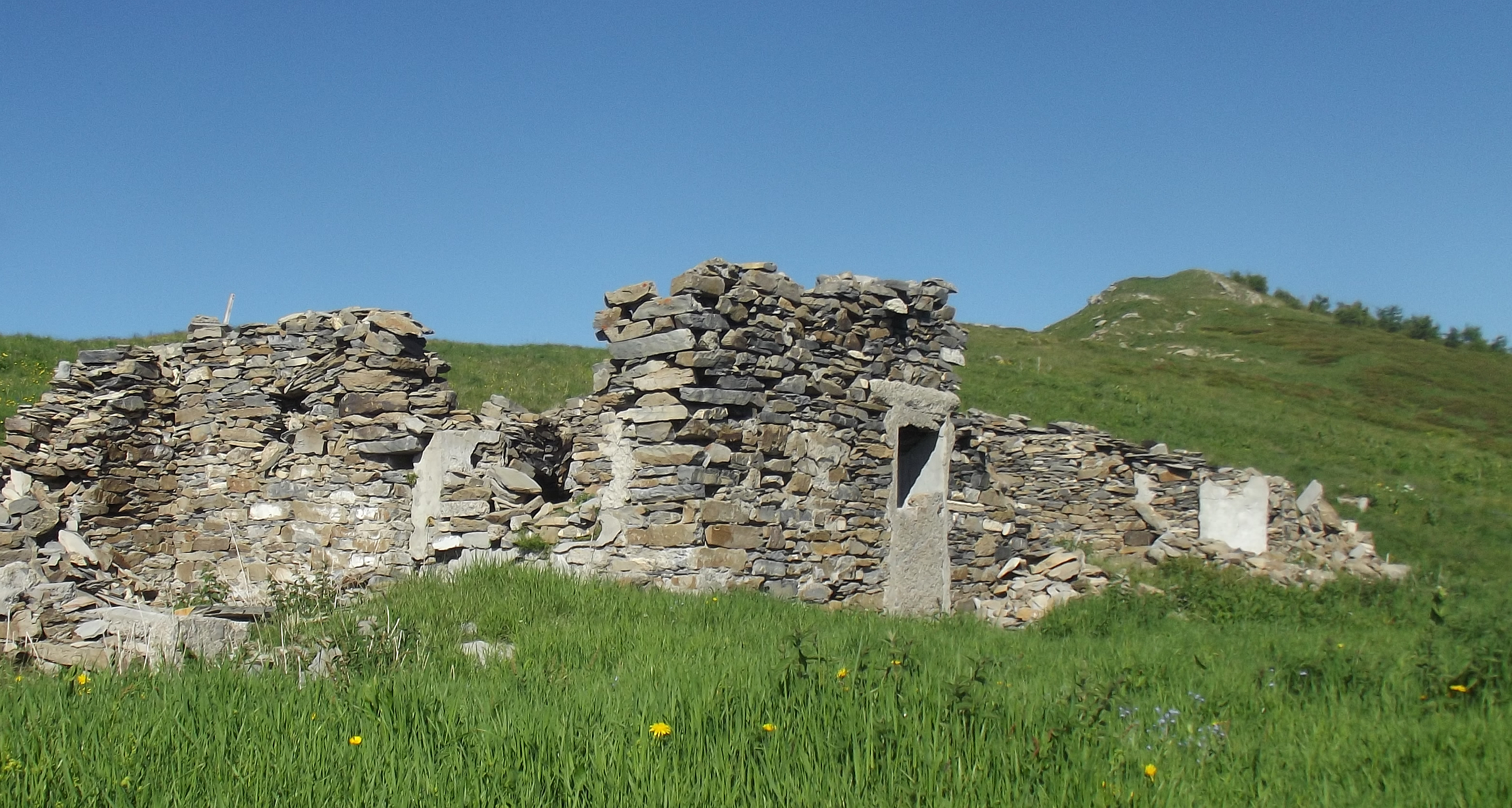
Ruins of an old barrak near the pass

- List of mountain passes
- Cima Garlenda
- Passo Frontè
