= Passo Frontè =

Mountain pass in Italy

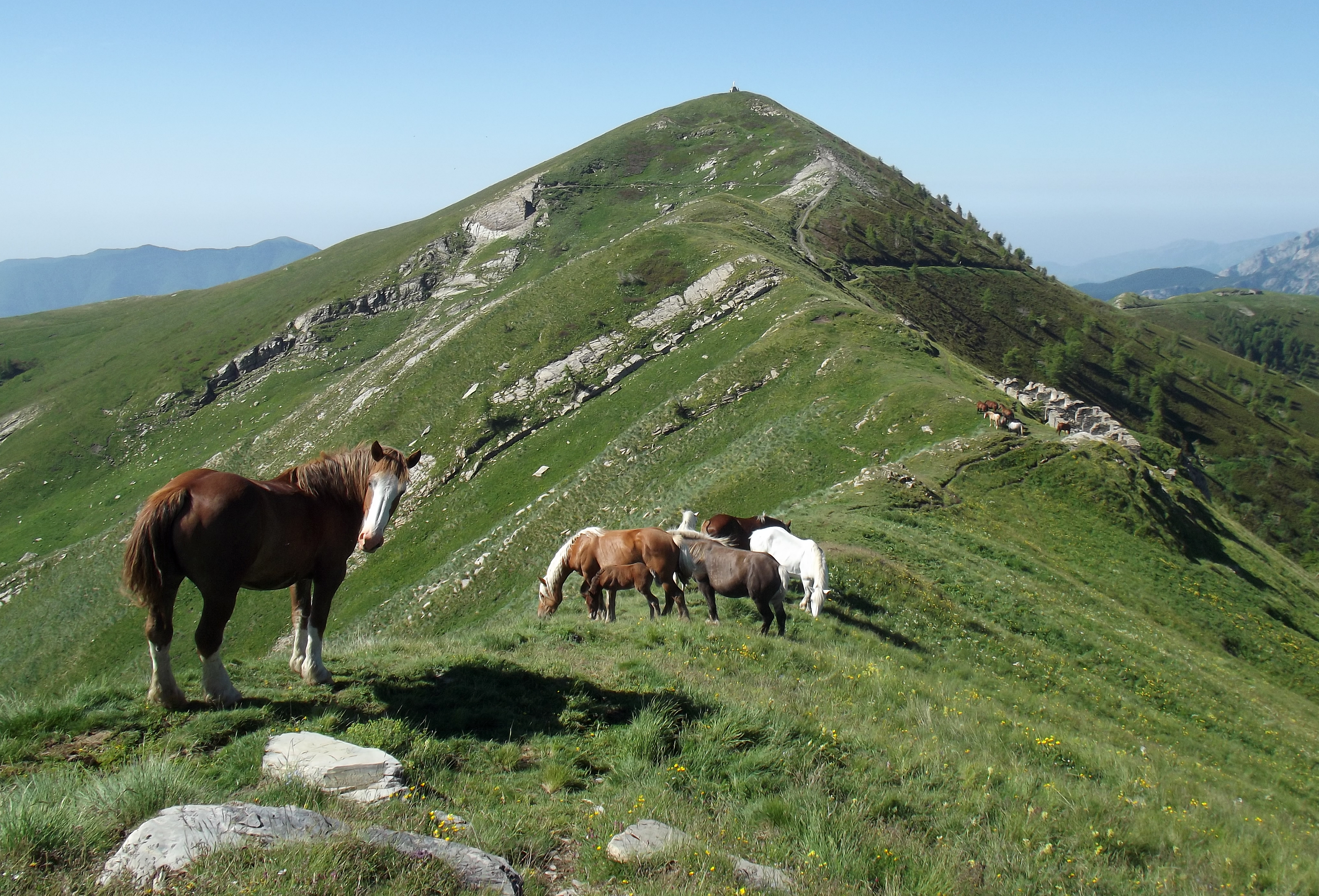
- Passo Frontè from Cima Garlenda

- Location within Alps
- Elevation: 2,081 metres (6,827 ft)
- Traversed by: Alta Via dei Monti Liguri

Third Approach
- Location: Liguria, Italy
- Range: Ligurian Alps
- Coordinates: 44°03′32″N 7°45′27″E

Passo Frontè (2081 m) is a mountain pass in the Province of Imperia (Italy). It connects Montegrosso Pian Latte, located in the Arroscia Valley, with Monesi di Triora (Tanaro Valley).

== Geography ==
Passo Frontè is located on the main chain of the Alps between Monte Frontè (2152 m) and cima Garlenda (2041 m). Near the pass there are some ruins of an old barrak.

== Hiking ==
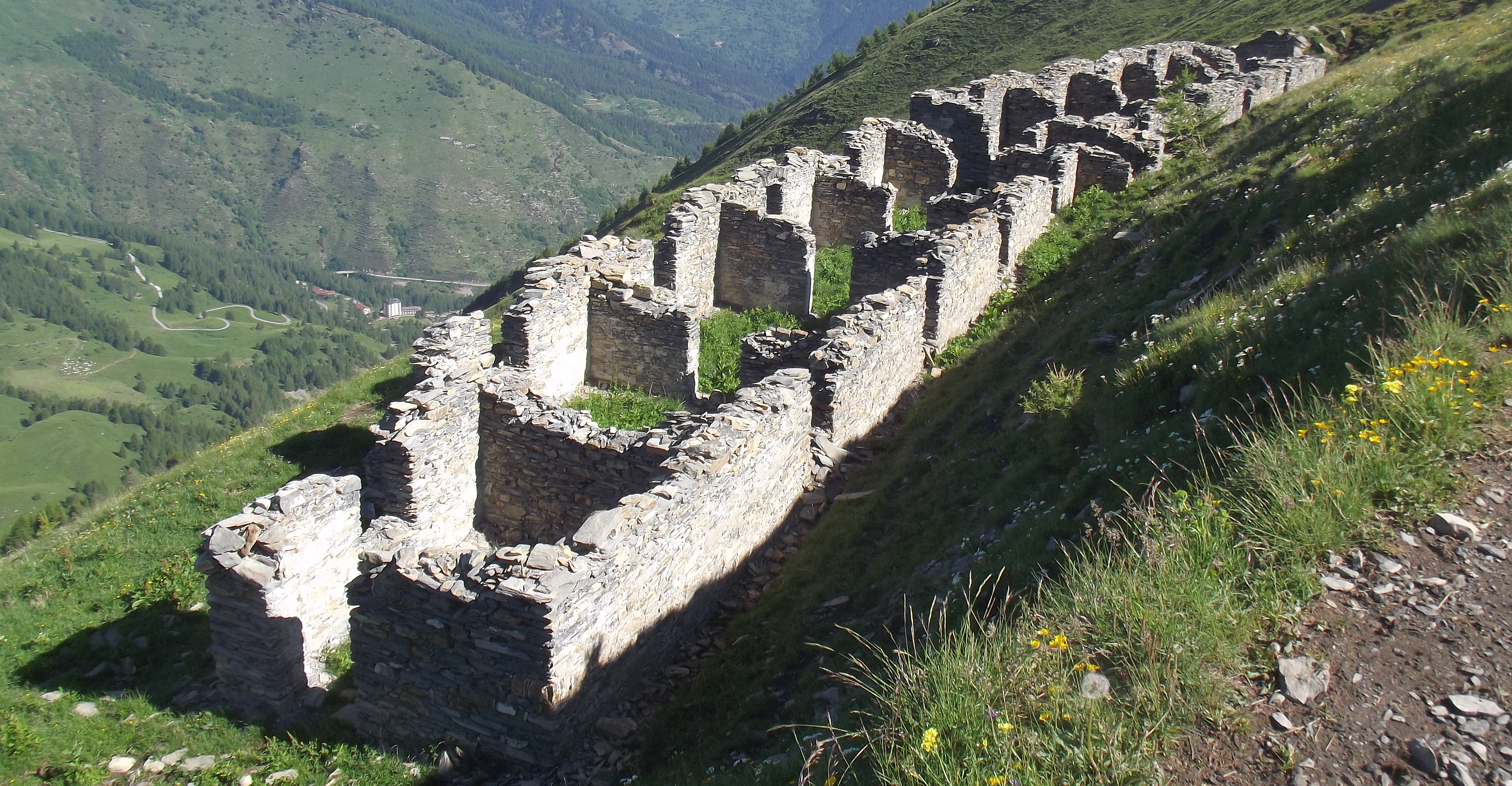
Ruins of the old barrak near the pass

The pass is accessible by off-road mountain paths coming from the nearby valleys and is crossed by the Alta Via dei Monti Liguri, a long-distance trail from Ventimiglia (province of Imperia) to Bolano (province of La Spezia).

During snowy winters the pass can also be reached with snowshoes.

== Mountain huts ==
- Rifugio Sanremo (2,054 m)

== See also ==
- List of mountain passes
- Passo Garlenda
