= Cima Garlenda =

Mountain in Italy

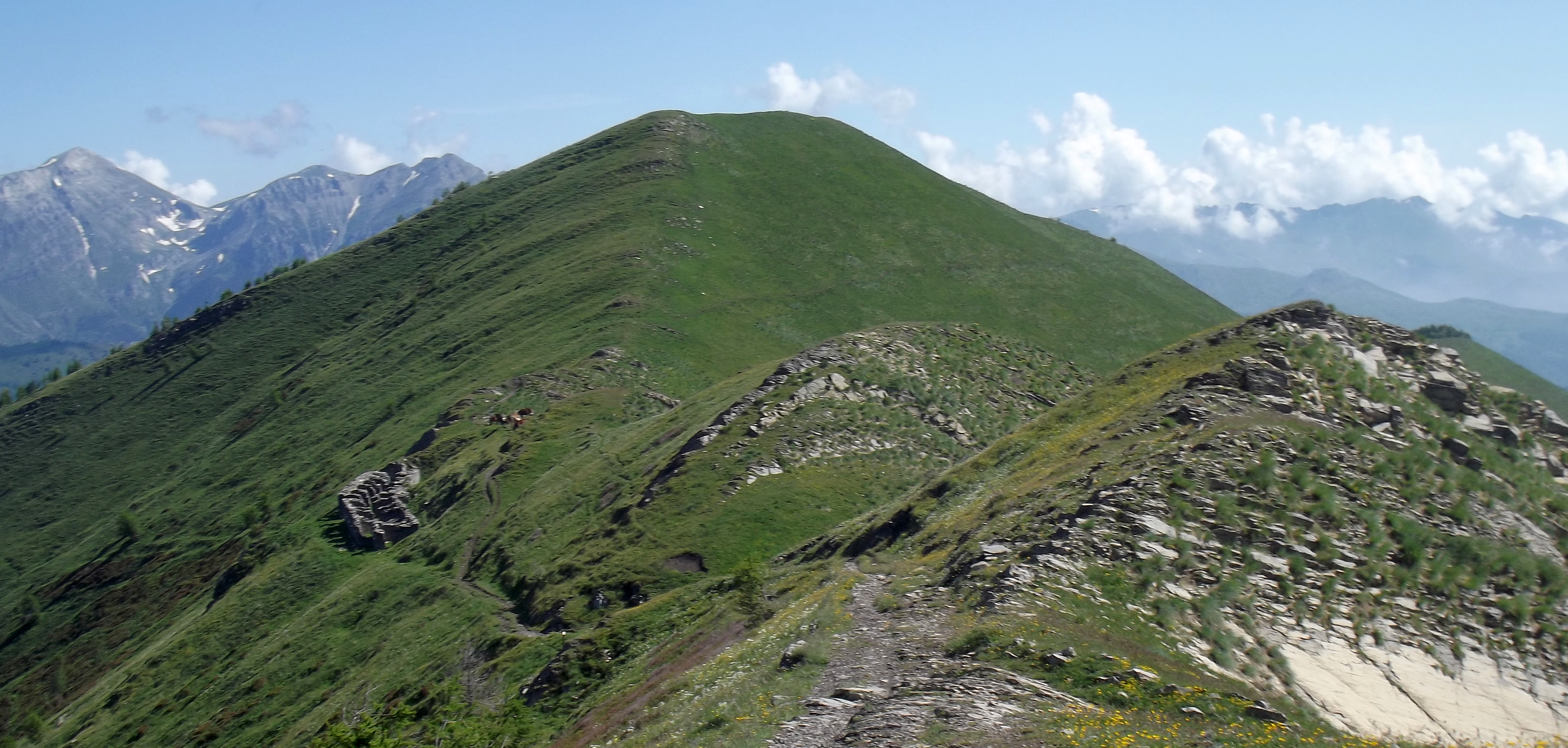
- The mountain seen from Monte Frontè

Highest point
- Elevation: 2,141 m (7,024 ft)
- Prominence: 60 m (200 ft)
- Coordinates: 44°03′40.39″N 07°45′34.2″E

Geography
- Location within Alps
- Location: Liguria, Italy
- Parent range: Ligurian Alps

Climbing
- First ascent: ancestral
- Easiest route: from Passo Frontè

Cima Garlenda is a 2,141 m (7,024 ft) mountain of the Ligurian Alps, in Italy. After Monte Saccarello and Monte Frontè it is the third Ligurian summit.

== Geography ==
The mountain is located in the province of Imperia, in Liguria. In the SOIUSA (International Standardized Mountain Subdivision of the Alps) it belongs to the Nodo del Monte Saccarello (SOIUSA code: I/A-1.II-A.1.a). Cima Garlenda is located on the main chain of the Alps between Tanaro and Arroscia valleys, and is divided from the neighbouring Monte Frontè by Passo Frontè (2,081 m (6,827 ft)).

== History ==
The slopes of Cima Garlenda were deforested during past centuries in order to increase pasture land. The lower part of the mountain was mainly used by cattle while is upper part was mainly grazed by sheep and goats. The slopes of the mountain belonging to Arroscia Valley are still used for grazing.

== Access to the summit ==
The summit of Cima Garlenda can easily be accessed following an unmarked track starting from passo Frontè, which is accessible by the Alta Via dei Monti Liguri, a long-distance trail from Ventimiglia (province of Imperia) to Bolano (province of La Spezia). Its wide summit can also be accessed by mountain bike.

== Mountain huts ==
- Rifugio Sanremo 2,054 m (6,739 ft)

== Conservation ==
The southern side of the mountain since 2007 is included in the Parco naturale regionale delle Alpi Liguri.

== See also ==
- Passo Garlenda
