= Monte Tanarello =

Mountain in Italy

- Mont Tanarel
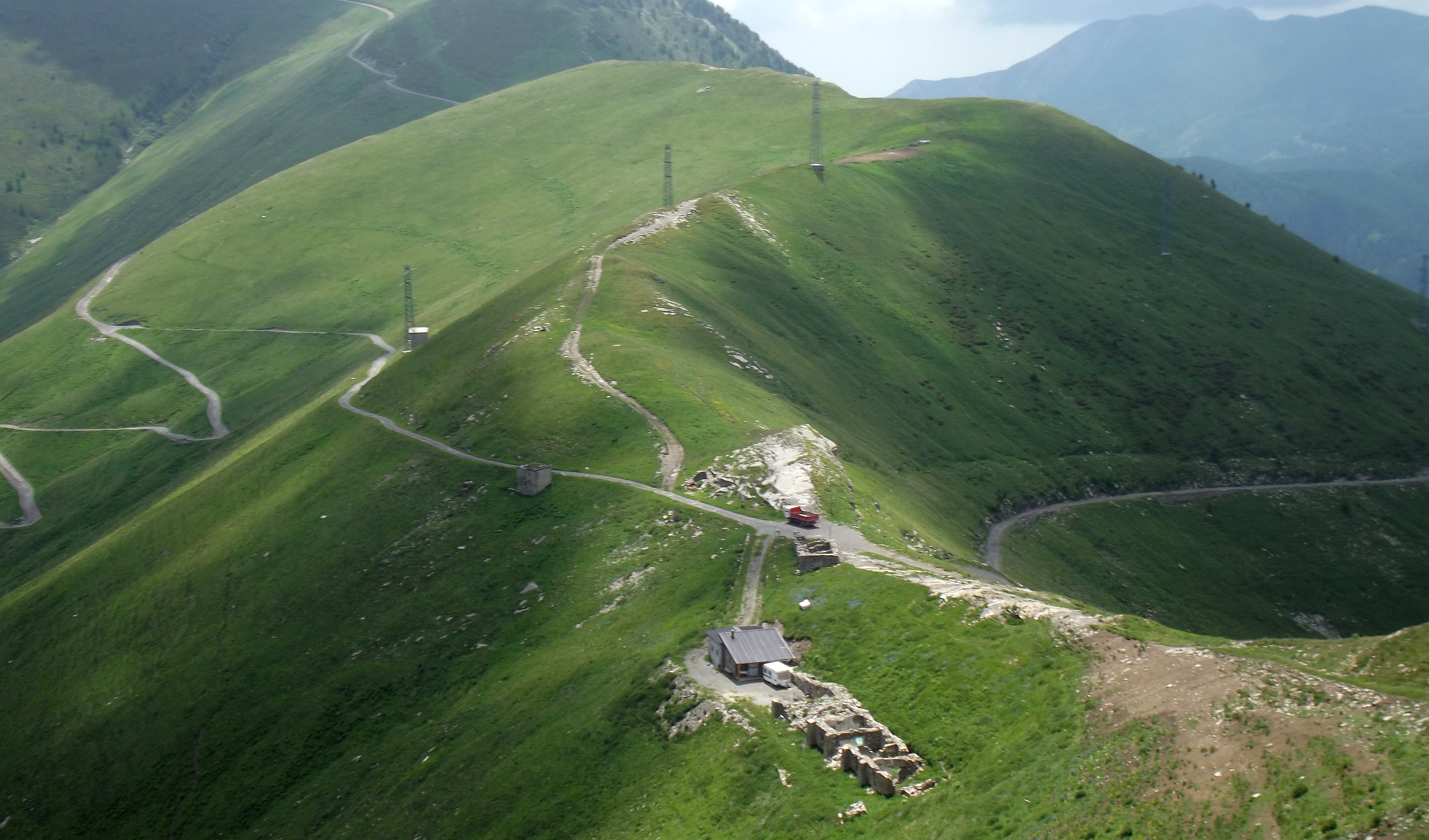
- The mountain from Cima Ventosa

Highest point
- Elevation: 2,094 m (6,870 ft)
- Prominence: 52
- Coordinates: 44°04′22.69″N 7°42′47.41″E

Naming
- English translation: mountain of the little Tanaro
- Language of name: Italian

Geography
- Location within Alps
- Location: Piemonte, Italy - Provence-Alpes-Côte d'Azur, France
- Parent range: Ligurian Alps

Climbing
- First ascent: ancestral
- Easiest route: hike

Monte Tanarello (Italian) or Mont Tanarel (French) is a 2094 metres high mountain located on the French-Italian border.

== Etymology ==
Tanarello is the diminutive form of Tanaro, the main right-hand tributary of river Po. The river rises between Monte Saccarello and Monte Tanarello as a stream named Tanarello and becomes Tanaro after receiving the waters of another stream called Negrone.

== History ==
The mountain up to World War II was totally belonging to Italy but, following the Paris Peace Treaties, signed in February 1947, is now shared between Italy and France.

== Geography ==
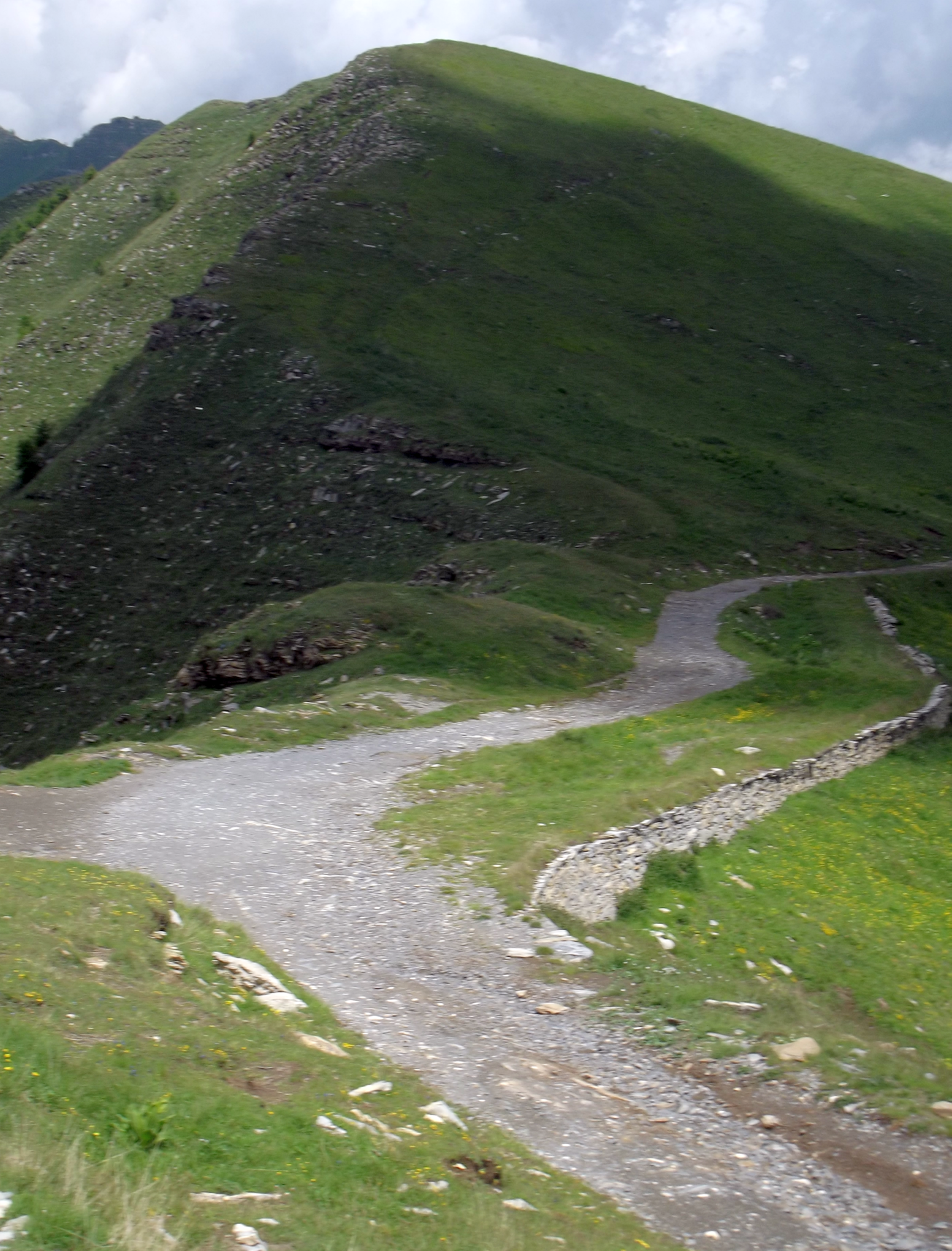
View from Basera Pass.

The mountain stands on the main chain of the Alps between Passo Tanarello (2042 m) and Passo Basera (2036 m). Its Italian side belongs to the province of Cuneo, in Piedmont (Tanaro valley), and the French one to Alpes-Maritimes, in the Provence-Alpes-Côte d'Azur (Roya valley).

=== SOIUSA classification ===
According to the SOIUSA (International Standardized Mountain Subdivision of the Alps) the mountain can be classified in the following way:

- main part = Western Alps
- major sector = South Western Alps
- section = Ligurian Alps
- subsection = Alpi del Marguareis
- supergroup = Catena del Saccarello
- group = Gruppo del Monte Saccarello
- subgroup = Nodo del Monte Saccarello
- code = I/A-1.II-A.1.a

=== Environment ===
The eastern side of the mountain is gentle and grassy while the western one is a little more rocky and steep.

== Access to the summit ==
The mountain is easily accessible by unmarked traks departing from Passo Tanarello or Passo Basera. The summit can also be accessed by mountain bike or with snowshoes.

== Mountain huts ==
- Rifugio Sanremo (2,054 m)
