= Monte Frontè =

Mountain in Italy

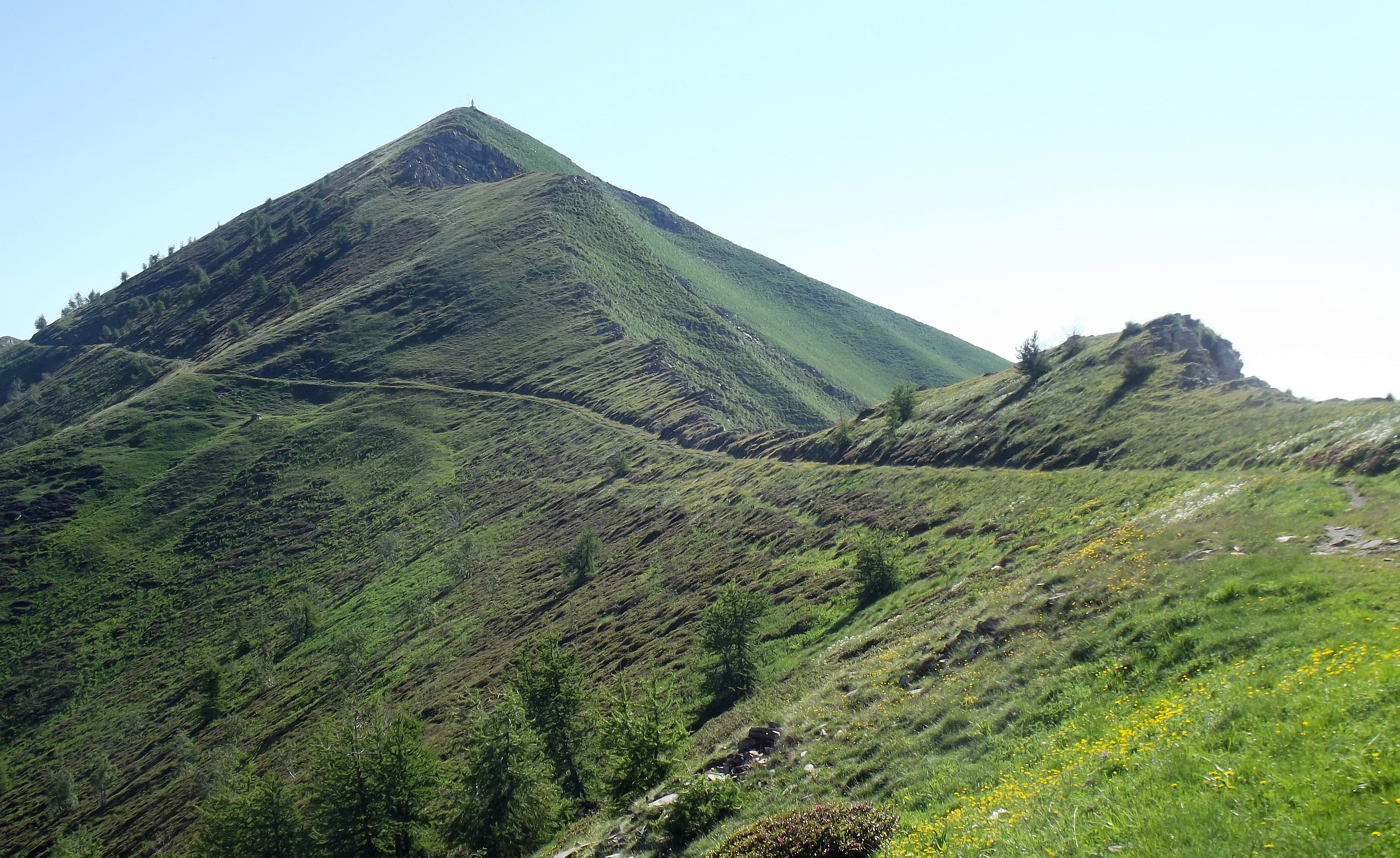
- Monte Frontè from Passo Garlenda

Highest point
- Elevation: 2,152 m (7,060 ft)
- Prominence: 132
- Coordinates: 44°03′18.63″N 7°45′24.09″E

Geography
- Location within Alps
- Location: Liguria, Italy
- Parent range: Ligurian Alps

Climbing
- First ascent: ancestral
- Easiest route: hike

Monte Frontè is a mountain in Liguria, northern Italy, part of the Alps. It is located in the province of province of Imperia. It lies at an altitude of 2,152 metres. After Monte Saccarello it is the second highest peak in the Ligurian region.

== Geography ==
Monte Frontè is located on the main chain of the Alps between Tanaro, Arroscia and Argentina valleys, and is divided from the neighbouring Cima Garlenda by Passo Frontè (2088 m).

=== SOIUSA classification ===
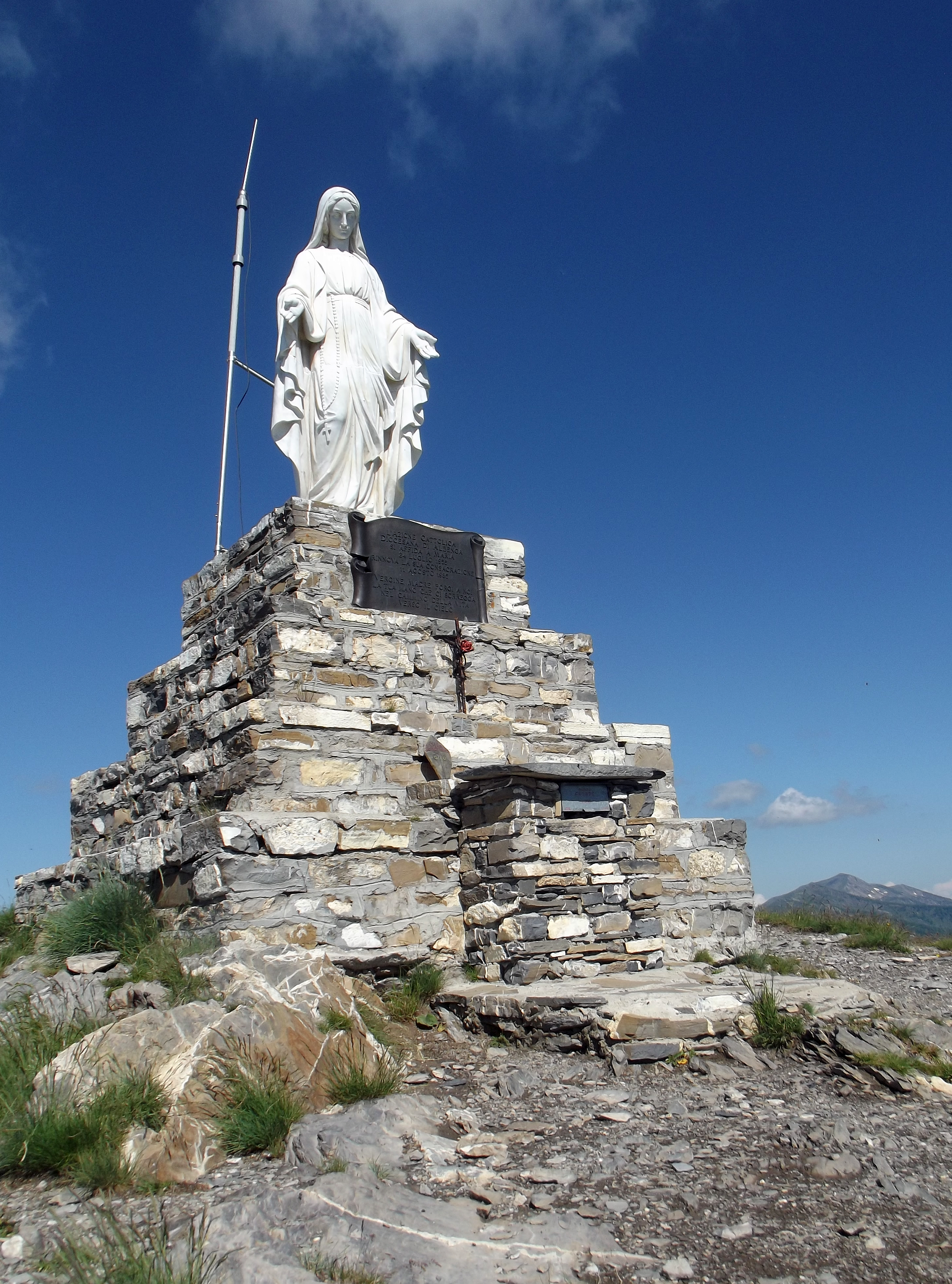
Madonna statue on the summit

According to the SOIUSA (International Standardized Mountain Subdivision of the Alps) the mountain can be classified in the following way:

- main part = Western Alps
- major sector = South Western Alps
- section = Ligurian Alps
- subsection = Alpi del Marguareis
- supergroup = Catena del Saccarello
- group = Gruppo del Monte Saccarello
- subgroup = Nodo del Monte Saccarello
- code = I/A-1.II-A.1.a

== Hiking ==
The mountain is accessible by mountain tracks starting from the Alta Via dei Monti Liguri, a long-distance trail from Ventimiglia (province of Imperia) to Bolano (province of La Spezia).

== Conservation ==
Since 2007, the southern side of the mountain has been included in the Parco naturale regionale delle Alpi Liguri.

== Mountain huts ==
- Rifugio Sanremo (2,054 m)

== See also ==
- Passo Frontè
