= Passo Tanarello =

Mountain pass in the Ligurian Alps

- Pas du Tanarel
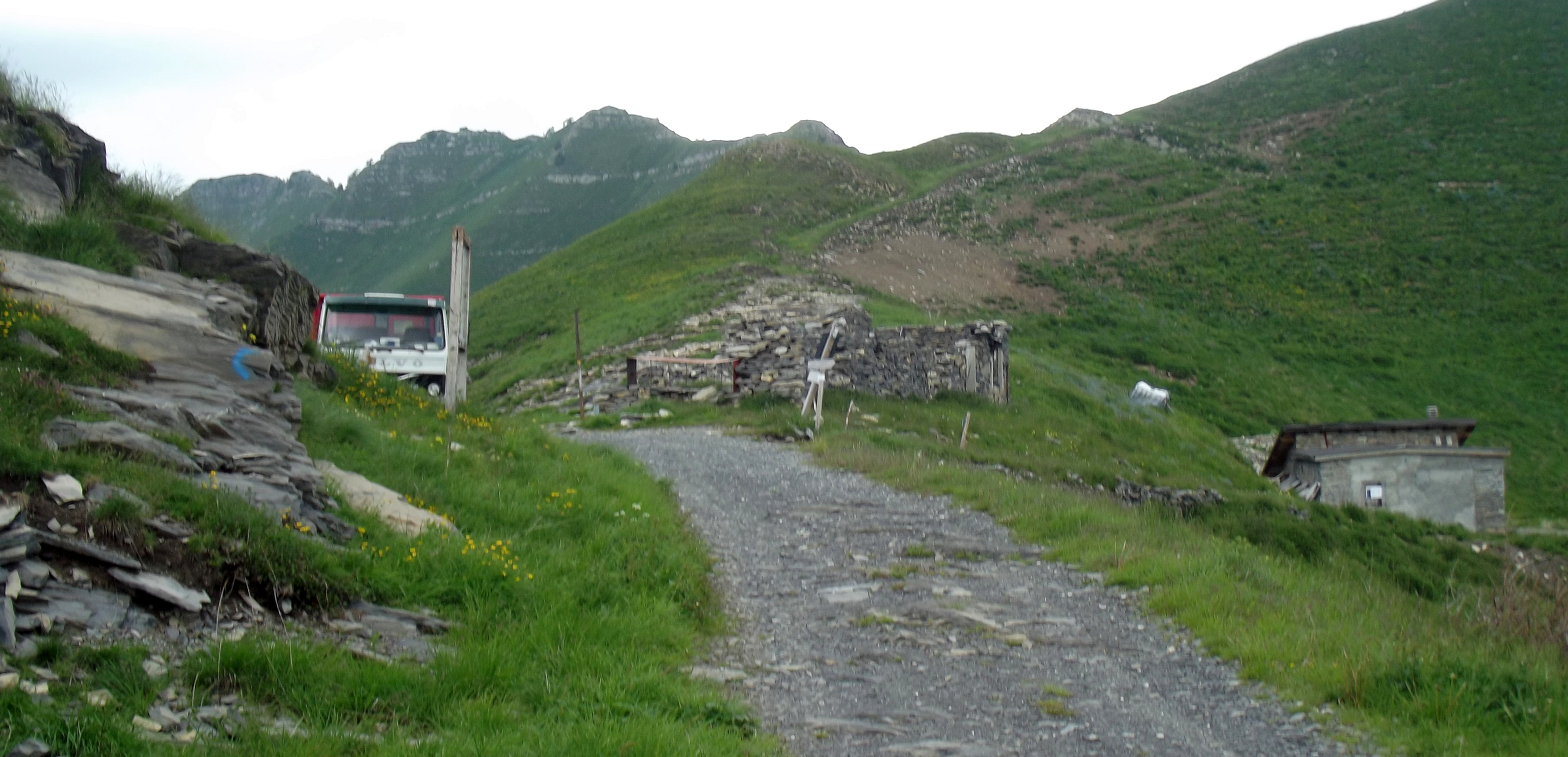
- Italian side

- Location within Alps
- Elevation: 2,042 metres (6,699 ft)
- Traversed by: former military dirt road

Third Approach
- Location: Piedmont, Italy; Provence-Alpes-Côte d'Azur, France
- Range: Ligurian Alps
- Coordinates: 44°04′45″N 7°42′54″E

Passo Tanarello (in Italian) or Pas du Tanarel (in French) at 2,042 m is a mountain pass in the Ligurian Alps. It connects the valleys of Roya in France and Tanaro in Italy.

== Etymology ==
Tanarello is the diminutive form of Tanaro, the main right-bank tributary of the River Po.

== Geography ==
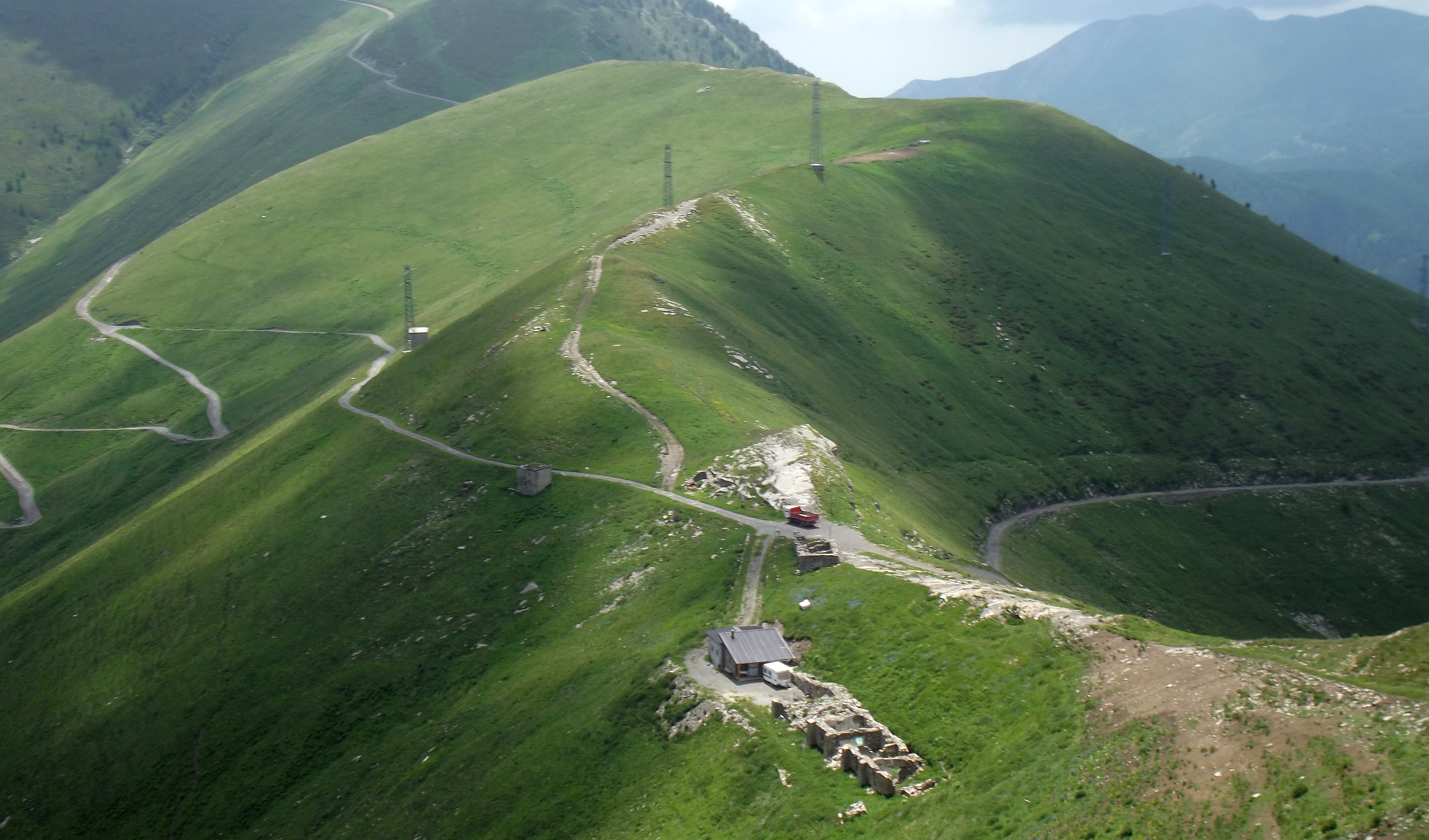
View from Cima Ventosa

Passo Tanarello is located on the main chain of the Alps between Monte Tanarello and Cima Ventosa. It connects the basins of the Ligurian Sea (south of the pass) and the River Po. Administratively the Italian side belongs to the municipality of Briga Alta and the French side to La Brigue.

Located near the pass are the remains of an old barracks and a small building still used by local farmers.

== History ==
Up to World War II, the pass was totally in Italian territory, but due to the Paris Peace Treaties signed in February 1947, it is now on the border between Italy and France.

== Hiking ==
The pass is easily accessible by walking and mountain bike by following the old military road. Monte Tanarello can be climbed using unmarked footpaths accessed from the path to the south and Cima Ventosa can be climbed to the north. It can also be accessed in winter with snowshoes.

== See also ==
- List of mountain passes
- France–Italy border
