= Regional Natural Park of the Ligurian Alps =

Nature reserve in Italy

- Parco Naturale Regionale delle Alpi Liguri
- IUCN category V (protected landscape/seascape)
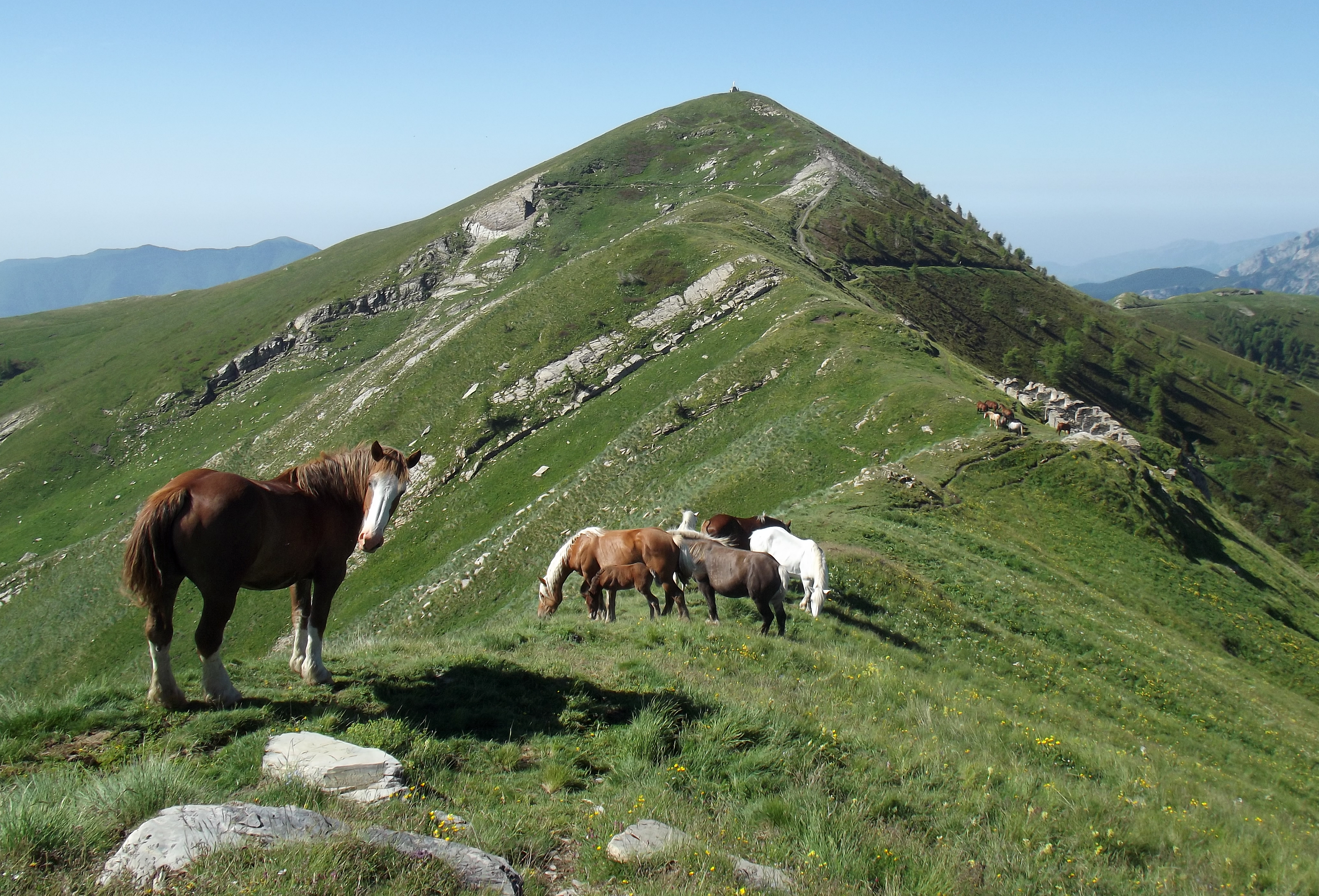
- The ridge from Cima Garlenda to Monte Frontè

- Location within Italy
- Location: Imperia Province, Italy
- Nearest city: Ventimiglia and Sanremo
- Coordinates: 44°00′27.11″N 07°41′40.34″E
- Area: 6,041 ha (14,930 acres)
- Established: 2007
- Governing body: Ente Parco delle Alpi Liguri (Pigna)
- Website: parconaturalealpiliguri.it

The Regional Natural Park of the Ligurian Alps (in Italian Parco Naturale Regionale delle Alpi Liguri) is a natural park in Province of Imperia (Liguria, Italy). It was established in 2007 by the legge regionale nr.34 of 15/11/2007.

== Geography ==
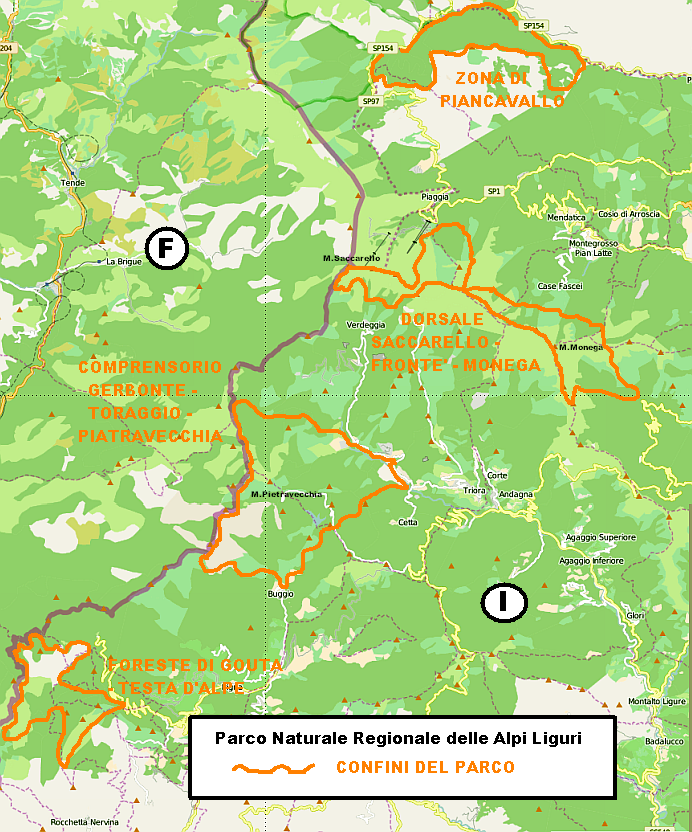
Borders of the park

Situated in the inland of Ventimiglia and Sanremo area, the regional park protects some of the most beautiful and important areas of the Ligurian Alps.

The protected territory, over 60 square kilometres (23 mi^{2}), includes four separate areas, each with its particular features:

- Zona di Pian Cavallo: located in the North of the park along the border with Piemonte, it includes the Bosco delle Navette (a well known conifers and beech forest) and some natural caves.
- Dorsale Monte del Monte Saccarello - Monte Frontè - Monte Monega: is the highest part of the park with wide grazing areas.
- Comprensorio del Monte Gerbonte - M. Toraggio/Pietravecchia: the area hosts the 600 ha Foresta Demaniale of Gerbonte and, on the mountains of the French-Italian border, a wide variety of microclimates.
- Foresta Demaniale di Testa d'Alpe: is the southernmost part of the park, just some 15 km from the Ligurian Sea; the Barbaira digs a narrow valley across dolomitic cliffs.

Some territories connecting these areas are under a lesser form of environmental protection named paesaggio protetto (protected landscape).

=== Concerned municipalities ===
The natural park is shared among seven different municipalities: Cosio di Arroscia, Mendatica, Montegrosso Pian Latte, Pigna, Rezzo, Rocchetta Nervina, Triora.

== Geology ==
Most of the protected area is covered by sedimentary rock mountains, with the predominant type of bedrock represented by flysch.

== Wildlife ==
Mountains and valleys of the park, due also to their proximity to the sea, are home to a wide wildlife variety.

Rare mammals in the park include stoats (Mustela erminea), mountain hares (Lepus timidus), European pine martens (Martes martes) and European snow voles (Microtus nivalis), as well as wolves (coming from Roya valley) and wildcats (Felis silvestris).

Among birds can be noticed the presence of the black woodpecker (Dryocopus martius) and Eurasian eagle-owl (Bubo bubo), the biggest European bird of prey. In the woods neststhe black grouse (Tetrao tetrix), and the eagle (Aquila chrysaetos), although close to the limit of its geographic range, lives on the park's cliffs.

The caves located in the park host a good variety of bats; among insects some endangered species of coleoptera of the protected area are Haptoderus nicaeensis, Percus villai and Pterostichus morio.

== Hiking ==
A wide range of footpaths is available within the park, that is crossed from south-west to east by the Alta Via dei Monti Liguri, a long-distance trail from Ventimiglia (province of Imperia) to Bolano (province of La Spezia).
