= Rocchetta Nervina =

- Comune
- Comune di Rocchetta Nervina
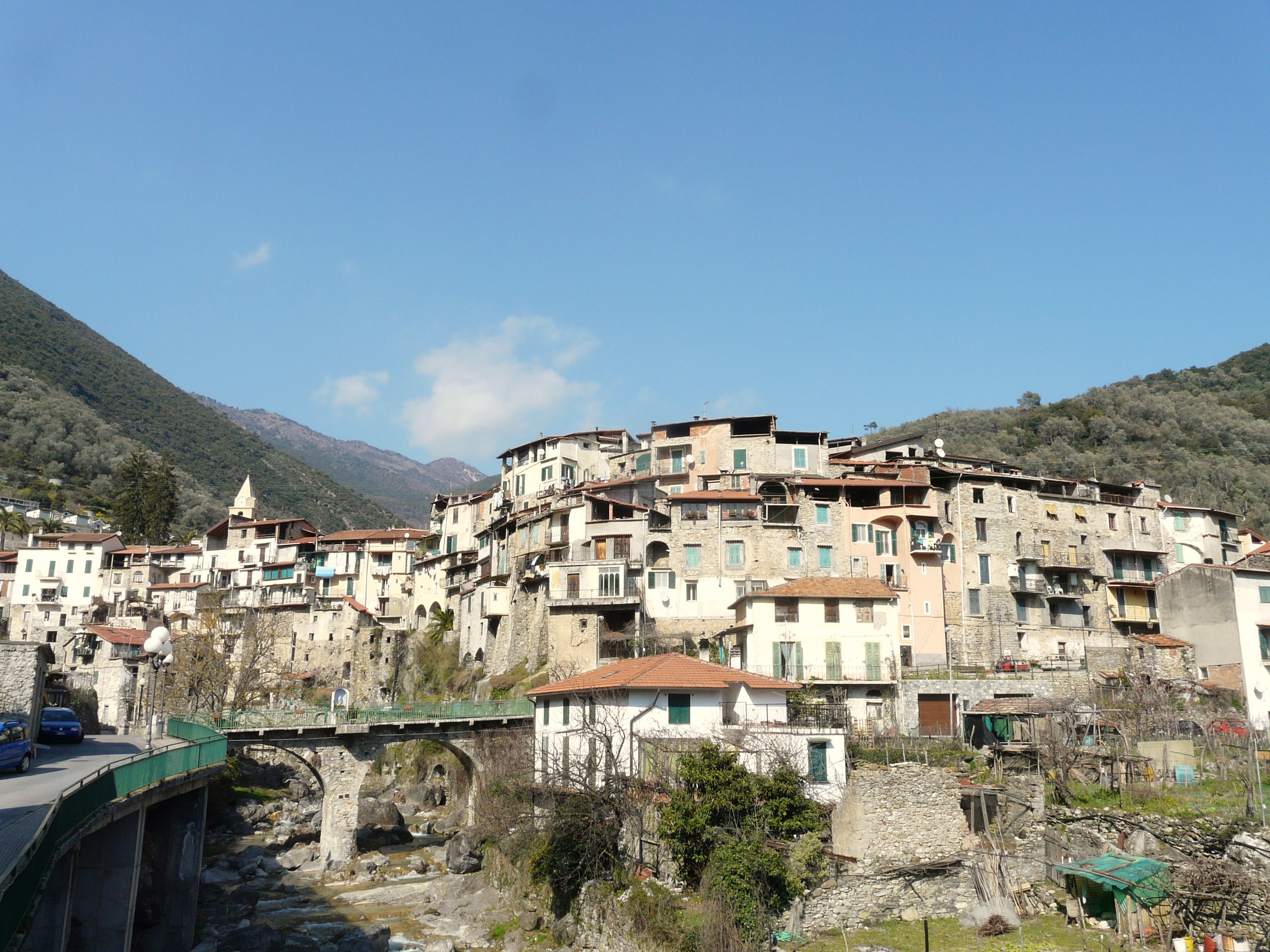
- View of Rocchetta Nervina

- Coat of arms

- Location within Italy Location within Liguria
- Coordinates: 43°53′N 7°36′E
- Country: Italy
- Region: Liguria
- Province: Imperia (IM)

Government
  - Mayor: Giampaolo Basso

Area
  - Total: 15.1 km^{2} (5.8 sq mi)
- Elevation: 235 m (771 ft)

Population (31 Dec. 2010)
  - Total: 275
  - Density: 18.2/km^{2} (47.2/sq mi)
- Time zone: UTC+1 (CET)
  - Summer (DST): UTC+2 (CEST)
- Postal code: 18030
- Dialing code: 0184

Rocchetta Nervina (Ligurian: A Rochetta) is a comune (municipality) in the province of Imperia in the Italian region of Liguria. It is located about 120 kilometres (75 mi) southwest of Genoa and about 35 kilometres (22 mi) west of Imperia, on the border with France.

== Geography ==
As of 31 December 2010, Rocchetta Nervina had a population of 275 and an area of 15.1 square kilometres (5.8 mi^{2}).

Rocchetta Nervina borders the following municipalities: Apricale, Breil-sur-Roya (France), Dolceacqua, Isolabona, Pigna and Saorge (France).

== Demographic evolution ==
Historical population

Year	Pop.	±%
1861	768	—
1871	735	−4.3%
1881	783	+6.5%
1901	816	+4.2%
1911	797	−2.3%

Year	Pop.	±%
1921	671	−15.8%
1931	632	−5.8%
1936	576	−8.9%
1951	520	−9.7%
1961	444	−14.6%

Year	Pop.	±%
1971	349	−21.4%
1981	284	−18.6%
1991	276	−2.8%
2001	259	−6.2%

Source: Data from ISTAT

== See also ==
- Parco naturale regionale delle Alpi Liguri
- Barbaira
