= Nervia =

Stream in Liguria, Italy

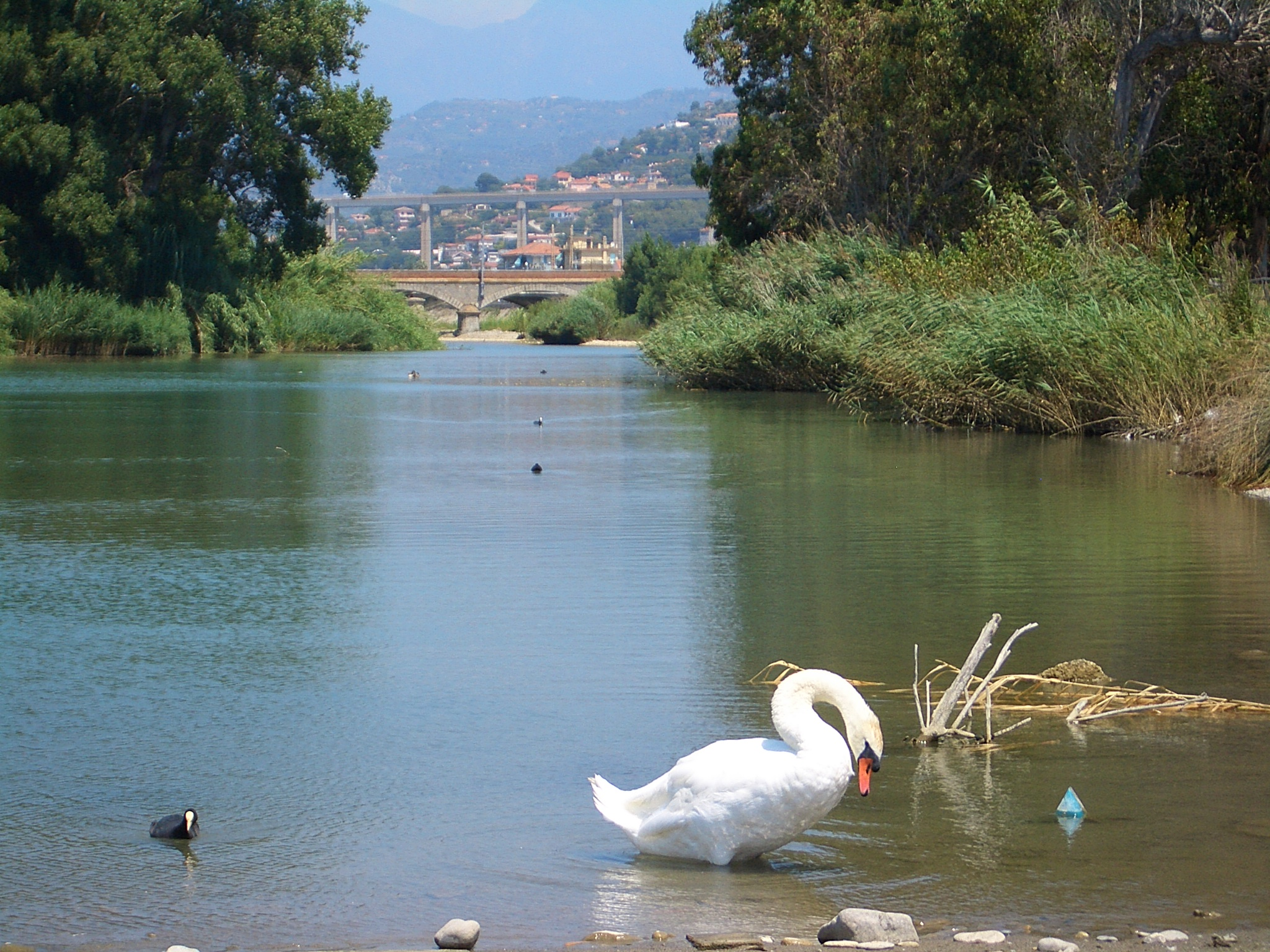
- The river at its mouth

Location
- Country: Italy, France

Physical characteristics
- Source
  - location: Monte Pietravecchia
  - elevation: 1,900 m (6,200 ft)
- Mouth
  - location: Ligurian Sea between Ventimiglia and Vallecrosia, Italy
  - coordinates: 43°47′03″N 7°37′47″E
  - elevation: 0 m (0 ft)
- Length: 28.3 km (17.6 mi)
- Basin size: 195 km^{2} (75 sq mi)
- Discharge
  - average: 2.64 m^{3}/s (93 cu ft/s)

The Nervia is a 28.3-kilometre (17.6 mi) stream of Liguria (Italy).

== Geography ==
The river rises near Monte Pietravecchia, in the Ligurian Alps, and flows through the Valle Nervia mainly heading south. It passes through the communes of Pigna and Isolabona; around one km before Dolceacqua it receives from right the Barbaira, its most important tributary. After Camporosso and enters the Ligurian Sea between Ventimiglia and Vallecrosia.

Nervia basin (195 km^{2}) is almost totally included in the Province of Imperia, besides 3.5 km^{2} belonging to France and located in its upper part.

=== Main tributaries ===
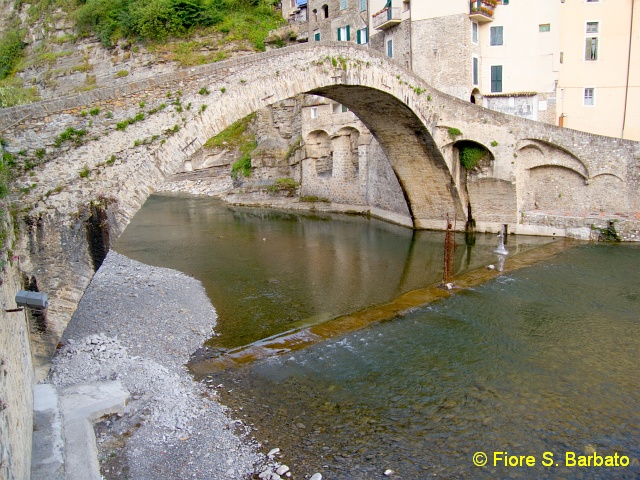
Middle age's bridge on the Nervia in Dolceacqua.

- Left hand:
  - rio Ubago,
  - rio Gordale,
  - rio Bonda,
  - rio Toca,
  - rio Merdanzo (which from Apricale flows down to the Nervia, reaching it near Isolabona),
  - rio Peitavino or Vallone degli Orti (flowing in the Nervia at Dolceacqua).
- Right hand:
  - rio dei Rugli,
  - rio Muratone,
  - rio Altomoro,
  - rio Marcora,
  - rio Papeira,
  - torrente Barbaira.

== Nature conservation ==
The mouth of the Nervia and its surrounding area are included in a SIC (Site of Community Importance) of around 44 ha called Torrente Nervia (code IT1315719); Monte Pietravecchia too, at the sources of the stream, is included in a SIC called Monte Toraggio - Monte Pietravecchia (cod. IT1315421).

== See also ==
- List of rivers of Italy
