= Barbaira (river) =

Stream in Liguria, Italy

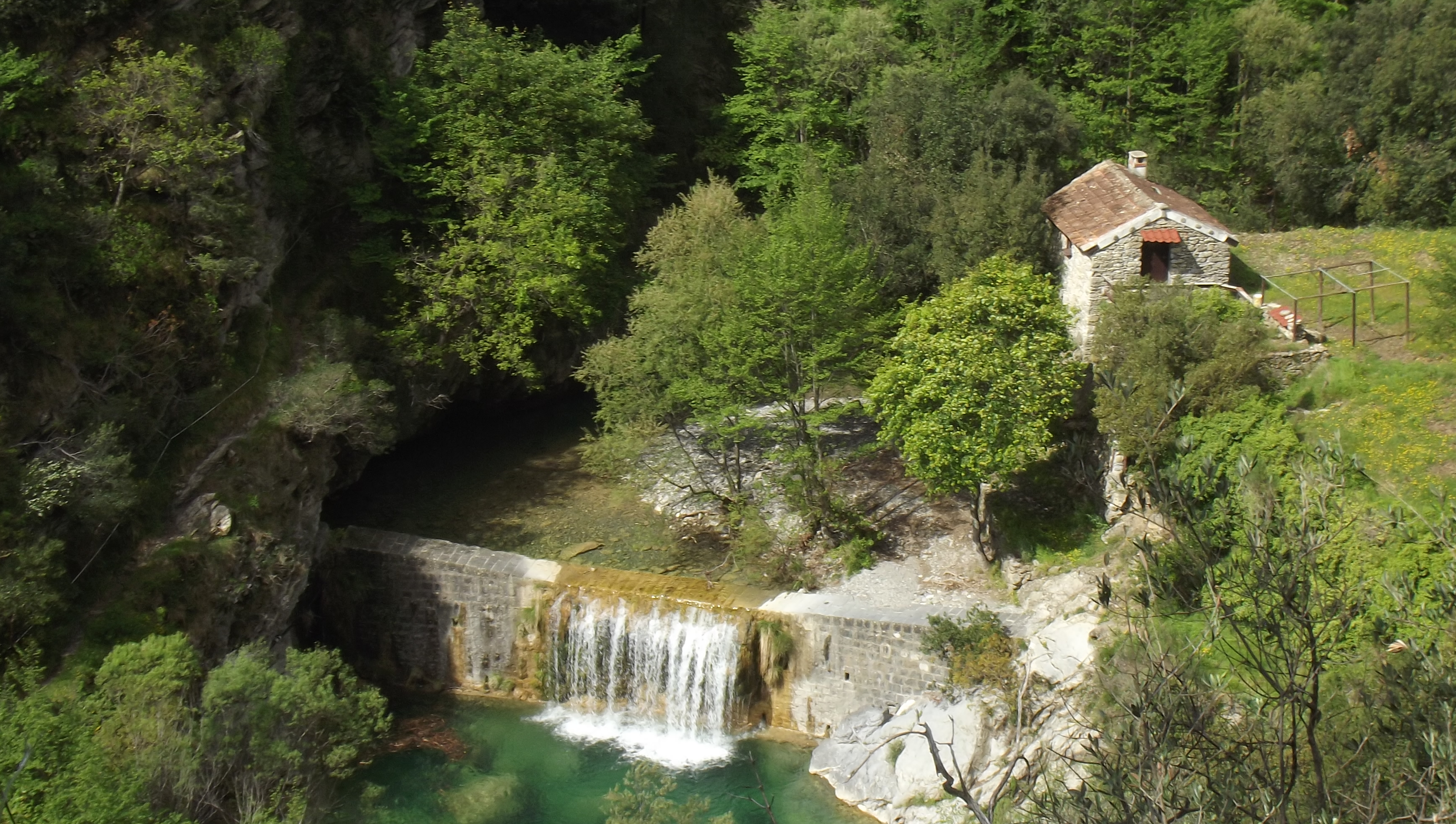

Location
- Country: Italy

Physical characteristics
- Source
  - location: between punta dell'Arpetta and monte Simonasso
  - elevation: around 1,450 m (4,760 ft)
- Mouth: Nervia
  - location: ponte Barbaira
  - coordinates: 43°51′41″N 7°37′24″E
  - elevation: 71 m (233 ft)
- Length: 15.83 km (9.84 mi)
- Basin size: 35.99 km^{2} (13.90 sq mi)

Basin features
- Progression: Nervia→ Ligurian Sea

The Barbaira is a 15.83-kilometre (9.84 mi) stream of Liguria (Italy); it is the main tributary of the Nervia.

== Geography ==
The stream rises between punta dell'Arpetta and monte Simonasso, in the Ligurian Alps, and flows through a woody valley mainly heading south-east. When it reaches the centre of the comune of Rocchetta Nervina it gets from left side the waters of its main tributary, rio Oggia. It enters the Nervia at ponte Barbaira (71 m).

=== Main tributaries ===
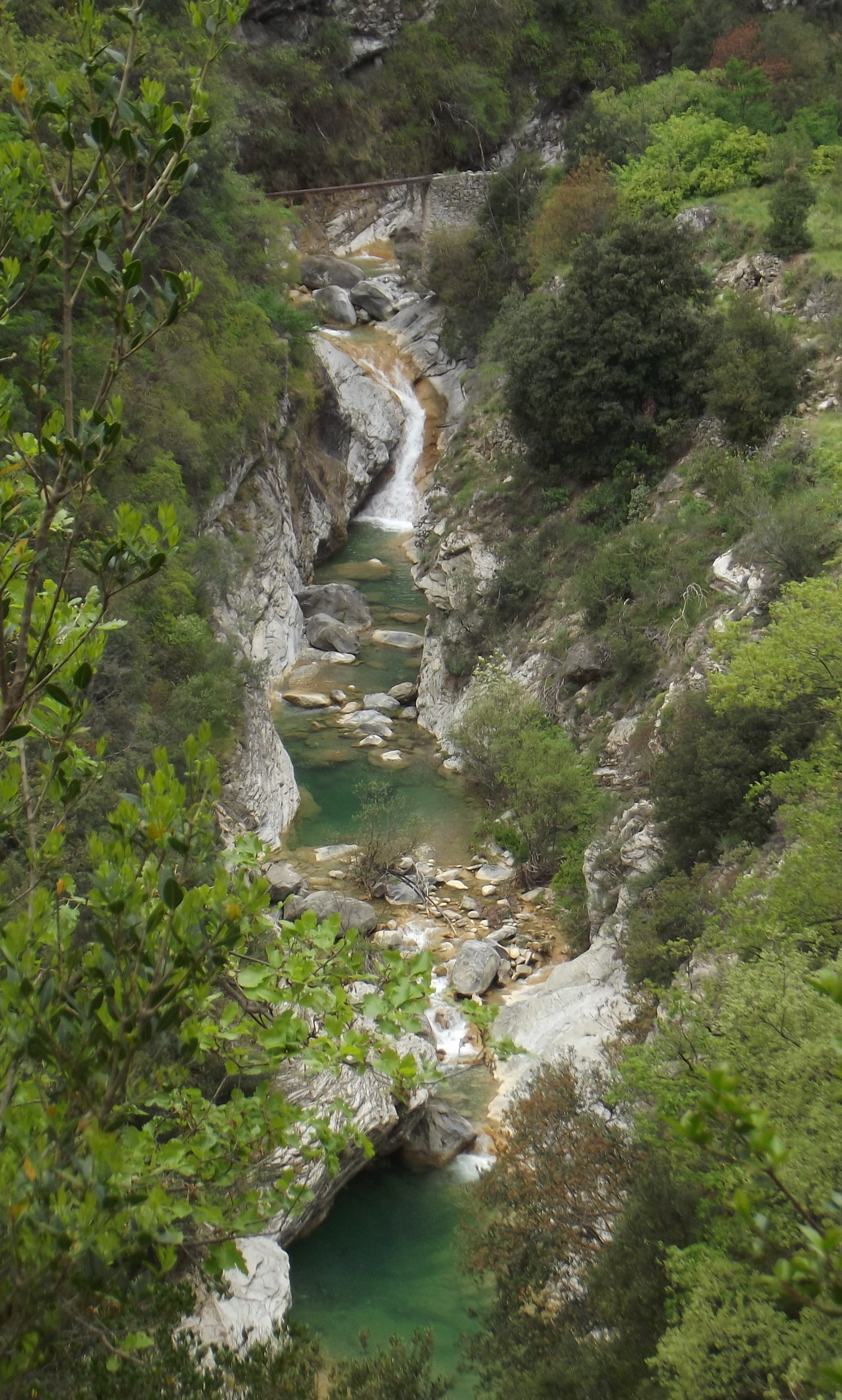
Intermediate course of the Barbaira.

- Left hand:
  - Rio d'Oggia: is the main tributary of the Barbaira and joins it in Rocchetta Nervina,
  - Rio Pau.
- Right hand:
  - Rio Massula: its source is located near Monte Abellio and reaches the Barbaira around one km south of Rocchetta Nervina.
  - Rio Roglio,
  - Rio Ubaghi di Sartu.

== Sport ==
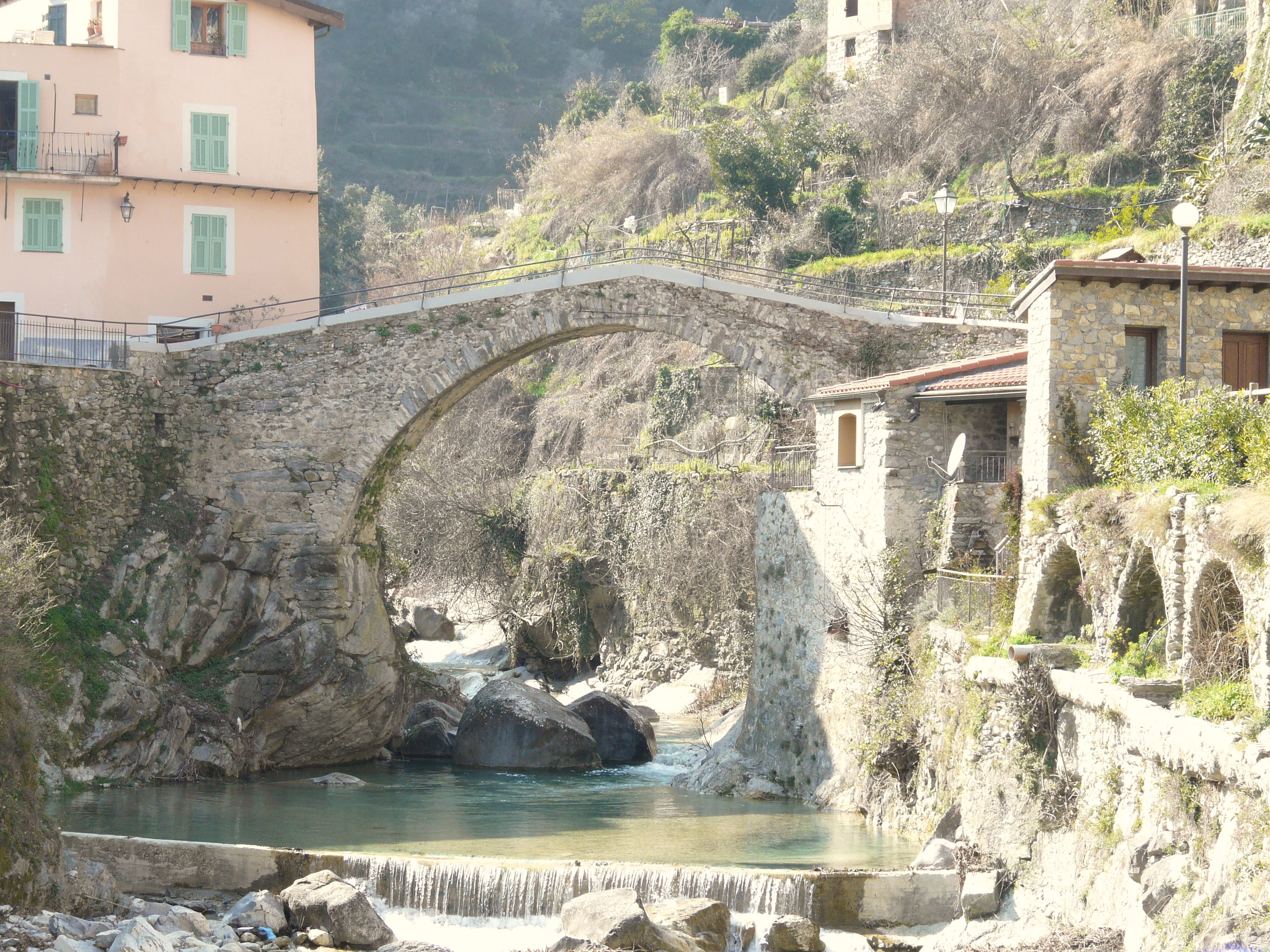
Old bridge on the Barbaira in Rocchetta Nervina.

The Barbaira is a well known site for practicing canyoning.

== See also ==
- List of rivers of Italy
- Parco naturale regionale delle Alpi Liguri
