= Mendatica =

- Comune
- Comune di Mendatica
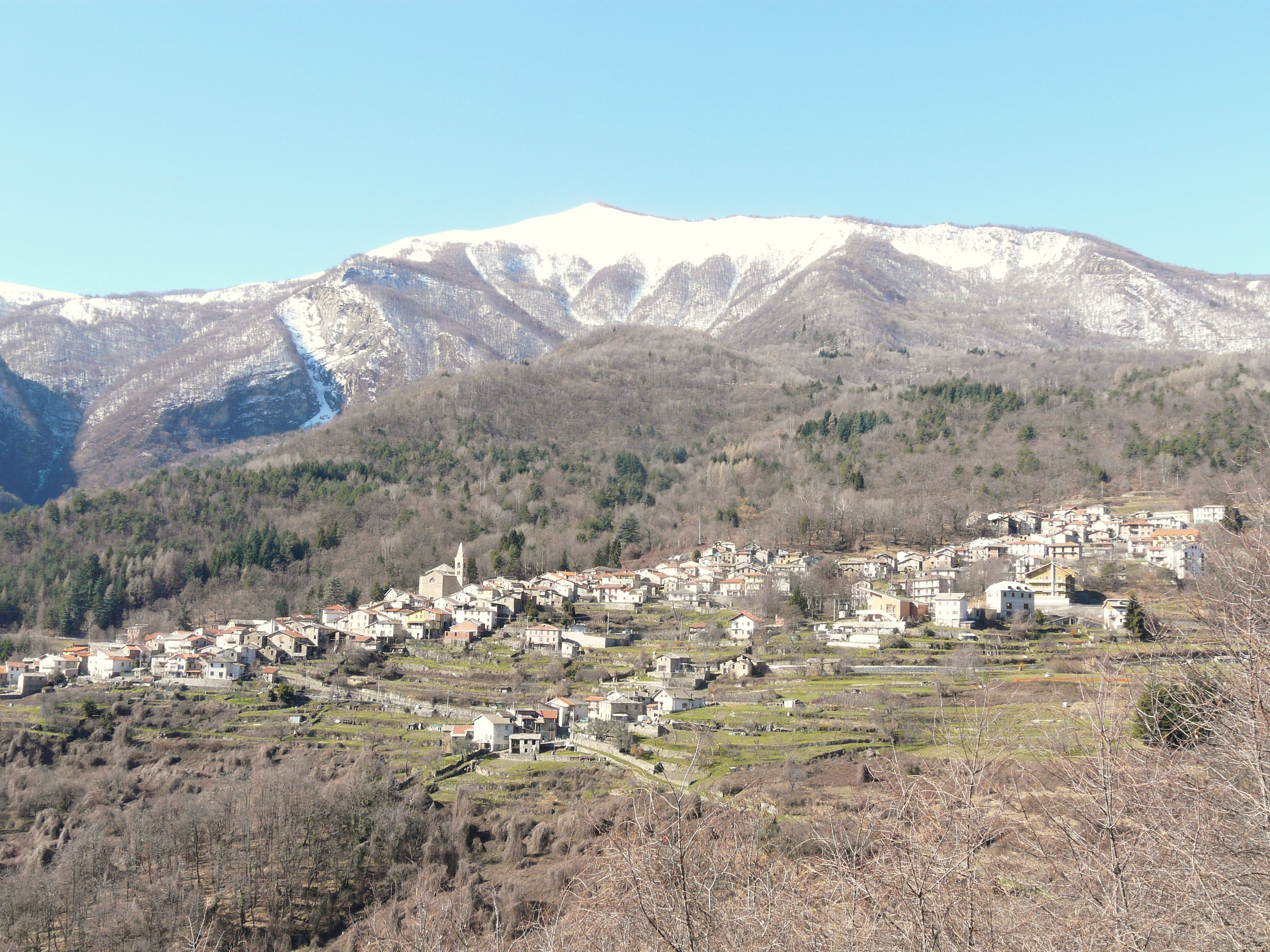
- View of Mendatica

- Location within Italy Location within Liguria
- Coordinates: 44°5′N 7°48′E
- Country: Italy
- Region: Liguria
- Province: Imperia (IM)
- Frazioni: Monesi

Government
  - Mayor: Piero Pelassa

Area
  - Total: 30.6 km^{2} (11.8 sq mi)

Population (31 October 2017)
  - Total: 187
  - Density: 6.11/km^{2} (15.8/sq mi)
- Time zone: UTC+1 (CET)
  - Summer (DST): UTC+2 (CEST)
- Postal code: 18025
- Dialing code: 0183

Mendatica (Ligurian: Mendaiga or Mendéga) is a comune (municipality) in the Province of Imperia in the Italian region Liguria, located about 100 kilometres (62 mi) southwest of Genoa and about 30 kilometres (19 mi) northwest of Imperia.

Mendatica borders the following municipalities: Briga Alta, Cosio di Arroscia, Montegrosso Pian Latte, and Triora.

== See also ==
- Colle San Bernardo di Mendatica
- Parco naturale regionale delle Alpi Liguri
