= Cosio di Arroscia =

- Comune
- Comune di Cosio di Arroscia
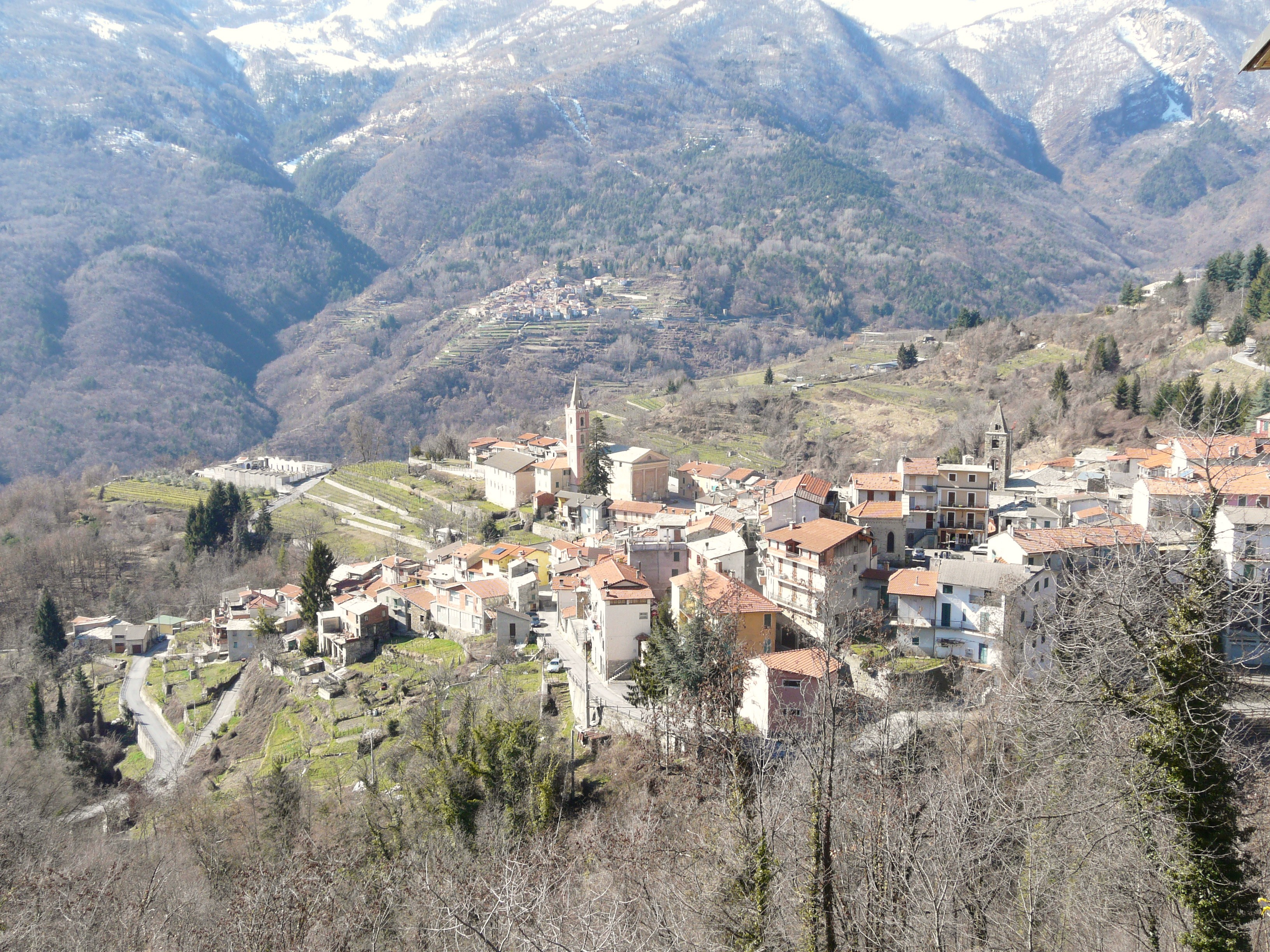
- View of Cosio di Arroscia

- Location within Italy Location within Liguria
- Coordinates: 44°5′N 7°50′E
- Country: Italy
- Region: Liguria
- Province: Imperia (IM)

Government
  - Mayor: Mauro Parodi

Area
  - Total: 40.56 km^{2} (15.66 sq mi)
- Elevation: 721 m (2,365 ft)

Population (30 June 2017)
  - Total: 208
  - Density: 5.13/km^{2} (13.3/sq mi)
- Demonym: Cosiaschi
- Time zone: UTC+1 (CET)
  - Summer (DST): UTC+2 (CEST)
- Postal code: 18023
- Dialing code: 0183

Cosio di Arroscia (Ligurian: Coxe, locally Cuxe) is a comune (municipality) in the province of Imperia in the Italian region Liguria, located about 100 kilometres (62 mi) southwest of Genoa and about 25 kilometres (16 mi) northwest of Imperia.

== History ==
In 1957 the Avant-Garde Groupe Situationist International was founded in Cosio di Arroscia by former members of two other avant-garde groupes, the International Movement for an Imaginist Bauhaus (Asger Jorn, Giuseppe Pinot-Gallizio a.o.) and the Lettrist International (Guy Debord a.o.).

== Geography ==
The small village is situated in the Arroscia's high valley, at about 20 kilometres (12 mi) from Imperia.

Cosio di Arroscia borders the following municipalities: Briga Alta, Mendatica, Montegrosso Pian Latte, Ormea, and Pornassio.

== See also ==
- Parco naturale regionale delle Alpi Liguri
