= Rifugio Sanremo =

Refuge in the Ligurian Alps in Italy

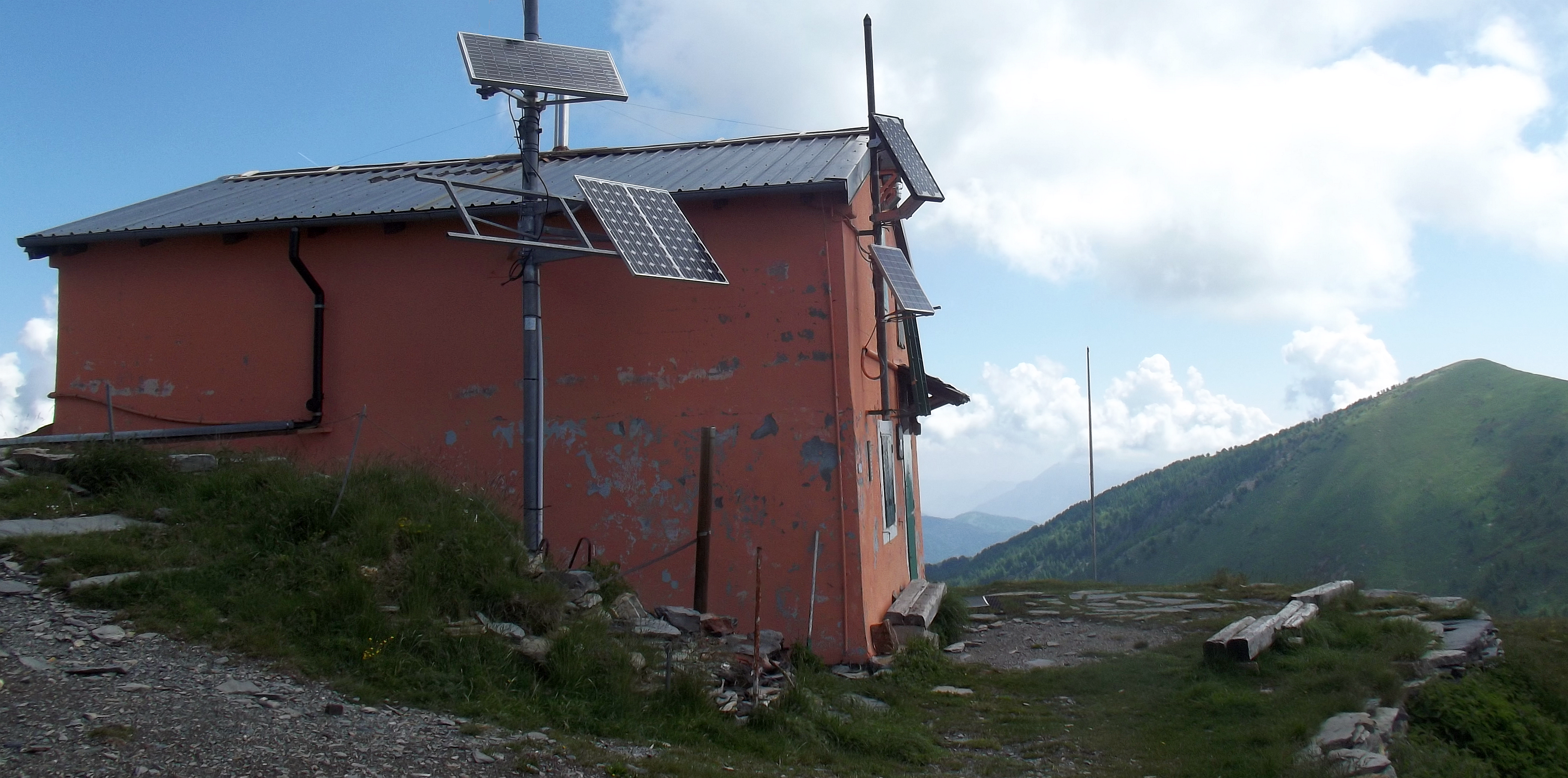
- Rifugio Sanremo, June 2015
- Interactive map of the Rifugio Sanremo area

General information
- Location: between Cima della Valletta and Monte Simonasso
- Coordinates: 44°03′26.3″N 7°43′57.9″E
- Elevation: 2,054 m (6,739 ft)
- Year built: 1950
- Owner: Club Alpino Italiano of Sanremo

Rifugio Sanremo is a refuge in the Ligurian Alps in Italy. Located at 2,054 m, is the highest mountain hut in Liguria.

== History ==
Rifugio Sanremo was built in 1950 and enlarged in 1984 with an upper floor containing a 30-bed dorm. It was dedicated in 2012 to Agostino Gauzzi (nicknamed "Tino"), an Italian alpinist who was among the founders of the Sanremo branch of Club Alpino Italiano.

== Access ==
The hut can be reached from La Brigue, France, and from Briga Alta and Montegrosso Pian Latte, Italy. It is located on the Alta Via dei Monti Liguri.

== See also ==
- Monte Saccarello
- Monte Frontè
- Cima Garlenda
