= Triora =

Triora Triöra
- Comune
- Comune di Triora
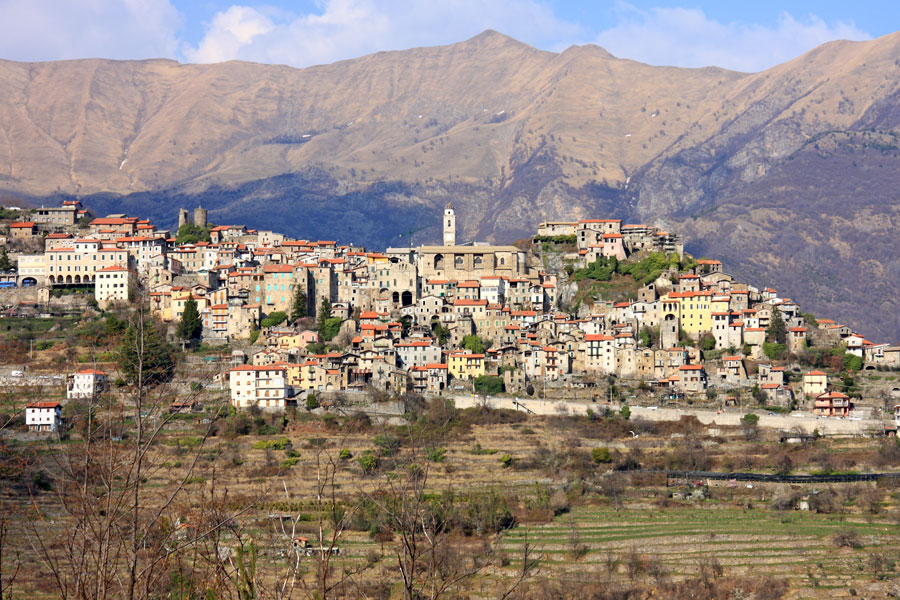
- View of Triora

- Coat of arms

- Location within Italy Location within Liguria
- Coordinates: 44°0′N 7°46′E
- Country: Italy
- Region: Liguria
- Province: Imperia (IM)
- Frazioni: Bregalla, Cetta, Creppo, Goina, Loreto, Monesi, Realdo, Verdeggia, Saccarello

Government
  - Mayor: Francesco Piano (Note: as Prefectural Commissioner)

Area
  - Total: 68.0 km^{2} (26.3 sq mi)
- Elevation: 780 m (2,560 ft)

Population (December 2004)
  - Total: 416
  - Density: 6.12/km^{2} (15.8/sq mi)
- Time zone: UTC+1 (CET)
  - Summer (DST): UTC+2 (CEST)
- Postal code: 18010
- Dialing code: 0184
- Patron saint: John of The Meadows (San Zane)
- Saint day: 23 June
- Website: Official website

Triora (Ligurian: Triöra) is a comune (municipality) in the province of Imperia in the Italian region Liguria, located about 100 kilometres (62 mi) southwest of Genoa and about 25 kilometres (16 mi) northwest of Imperia, on the border with France. As of 31 December 2004, it had a population of 416 and an area of 68.0 square kilometres (26.3 mi^{2}).

The municipality of Triora contains the frazioni (subdivisions, mainly villages and hamlets) Bregalla, Cetta, Creppo, Goina, Loreto, Monesi, Realdo, Verdeggia, and Saccarello. Triora borders the following municipalities: Briga Alta, Castelvittorio, La Brigue (France), Mendatica, Molini di Triora, Montegrosso Pian Latte, Pigna and Saorge (France). It is one of I Borghi più belli d'Italia ("The most beautiful villages of Italy").

== Culture ==
The town is an elite member of I Borghi più belli d'Italia, a list of the top 100 most beautiful medieval citadels in Italy. It also has been awarded a Touring Club Italiano Bandiera arancione, a similarly prestigious achievement recognizing the best places for tourists to enjoy.

Triora was the site of the last witch trials held in Italy, during the Renaissance. As such it has been selected as the location of a series of folklore- and horror-themed events and festivals in recent years. It has three annual festivals: a summer witchcraft festival, in August; and two autumn celebrations: the mushroom festival in September; and Halloween, at the end of October. Then there are the many smaller fairs of the year, including the Christmas bonfire on 24 December; St. John of the Meadows, the local patron saint's day, on 23 June; a chestnut fair in October; an All Souls Day fair, at the start of November; and a series of Easter parades, before, during and after Holy Week, each Spring.

== Demographic evolution ==
Historical population

Year	Pop.	±%
1861	3,306	—
1871	3,295	−0.3%
1881	3,117	−5.4%
1901	2,860	−8.2%
1911	2,655	−7.2%

Year	Pop.	±%
1921	2,319	−12.7%
1931	1,875	−19.1%
1936	1,757	−6.3%
1951	1,319	−24.9%
1961	984	−25.4%

Year	Pop.	±%
1971	713	−27.5%
1981	507	−28.9%
1991	418	−17.6%
2001	408	−2.4%

Source: Data from ISTAT

== John of Triora ==
John of Triora, a Franciscan missionary martyr in China, was born near Triora in 1760.

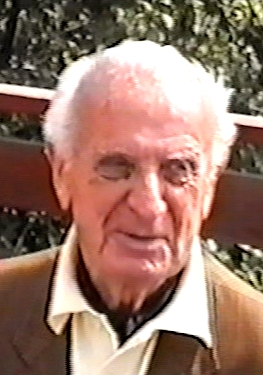
Francesco Moraldo in Creppo in 2000

== Francesco Moraldo from Creppo ==
During all the period of the German occupation and of the Italian Social Republic, in the village of Creppo Francesco Moraldo (born Creppo, 30 December 1906 – 28 April 2001) hid in his house and protected from deportation two German Jewish orphans, nine and eleven years old.

Moraldo had been a butler in France of the Italian banker Angelo Donati who had taken the children under his protection in July 1942 when their parents had been deported from Nice to Auschwitz.

When Donati had to take refuge in Switzerland after the Armistice of 8 September 1943, Moraldo took the children with him to his home village. The whole population of the village, informed of the situation, helped actively with their protection, despite the danger due to fights and frequent Germans roundups in the area.

For this commitment to solidarity on 11 February 1999, the Yad Vashem Institute of Jerusalem awarded Francesco Moraldo the title of Righteous Among the Nations.

== Twin towns ==
Triora is twinned with:

- La Brigue, France (2006)

== See also ==
- Parco naturale regionale delle Alpi Liguri
