= Monte Saccarello =

Mountain in Italy

- French: Mont Saccarel
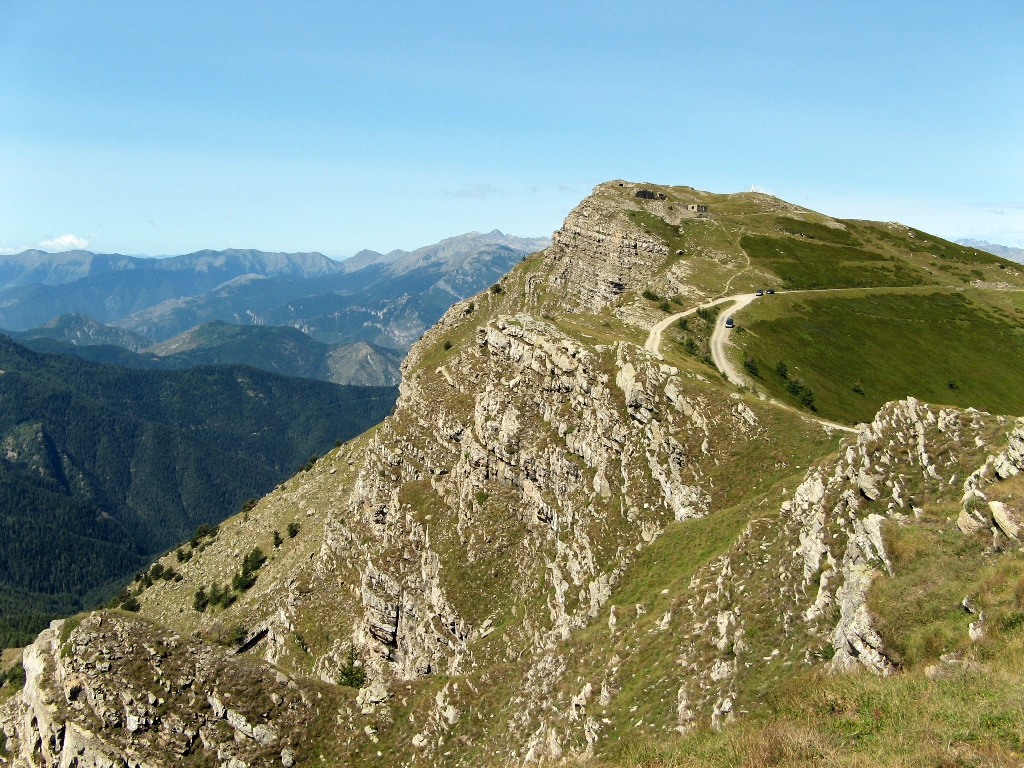

Highest point
- Elevation: 2,201 m (7,221 ft)
- Prominence: 165 m (541 ft)
- Isolation: 3.44 km (2.14 mi)
- Coordinates: 44°03′43″N 7°42′45″E

Geography
- Location within Alps
- Location: Liguria/Piedmont, Italy - Provence-Alpes-Côte d'Azur, France
- Parent range: Ligurian Alps

Climbing
- First ascent: ancestral
- Easiest route: dirt road

Monte Saccarello (Italian) or Mont Saccarel (French) is a mountain located on the French-Italian border between Liguria, Piedmont and Provence-Alpes-Côte d'Azur.

== History ==
The mountain up to World War II was totally belonging to Italy but, following the Paris Peace Treaties, signed in February 1947, is now shared between Italy and France.

== Geography ==
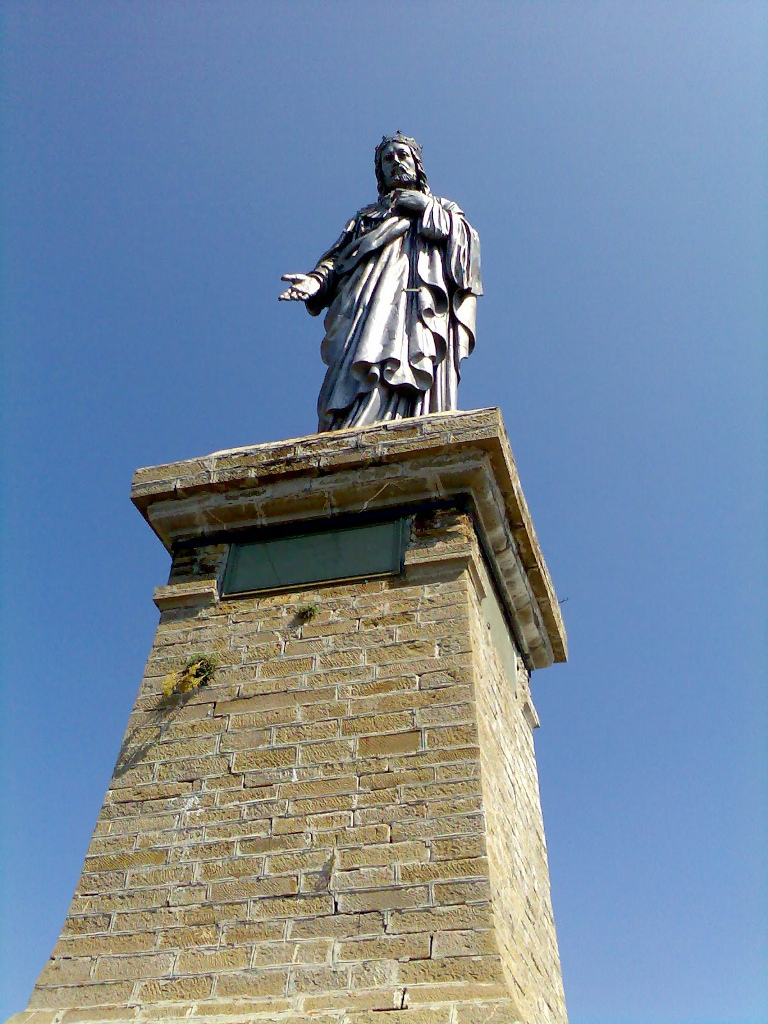
The Redemptor's statue

The mountain belongs to the Ligurian Alps; located on the main chain of the Alps, is the maximum elevation in the Italian region of Liguria.

On a sub-peak of the mountain stands a large bronze statue of Jesus Christ built in 1901.

From its north-eastern slopes rises the Tanaro.

=== SOIUSA classification ===
According to the SOIUSA (International Standardized Mountain Subdivision of the Alps) the mountain can be classified in the following way:

- main part = Western Alps
- major sector = South Western Alps
- section = Ligurian Alps
- subsection = Alpi del Marguareis
- supergroup = Catena del Saccarello
- group = Gruppo del Monte Saccarello
- subgroup = Nodo del Monte Saccarello
- code = I/A-1.II-A.1.a

=== Environment ===
The eastern side of the mountain is gentle and grassy while the western one is a rocky and very steep.

== Hiking ==
The mountain is accessible by mountain paths and is reached by the Alta Via dei Monti Liguri, a long-distance trail from Ventimiglia (province of Imperia) to Bolano (province of La Spezia).

== Mountain huts ==
- Rifugio Sanremo (2,054 m)

== Conservation ==
The Ligurian side of the mountain since 2007 is included in the Parco naturale regionale delle Alpi Liguri.

== See also ==
- List of Italian regions by highest point
- Monte Tanarello
- France–Italy border
