= Montegrosso Pian Latte =

Montegrosso Pian Latte Montegrosso Cian de Laite
- Comune
- Comune di Montegrosso Pian Latte
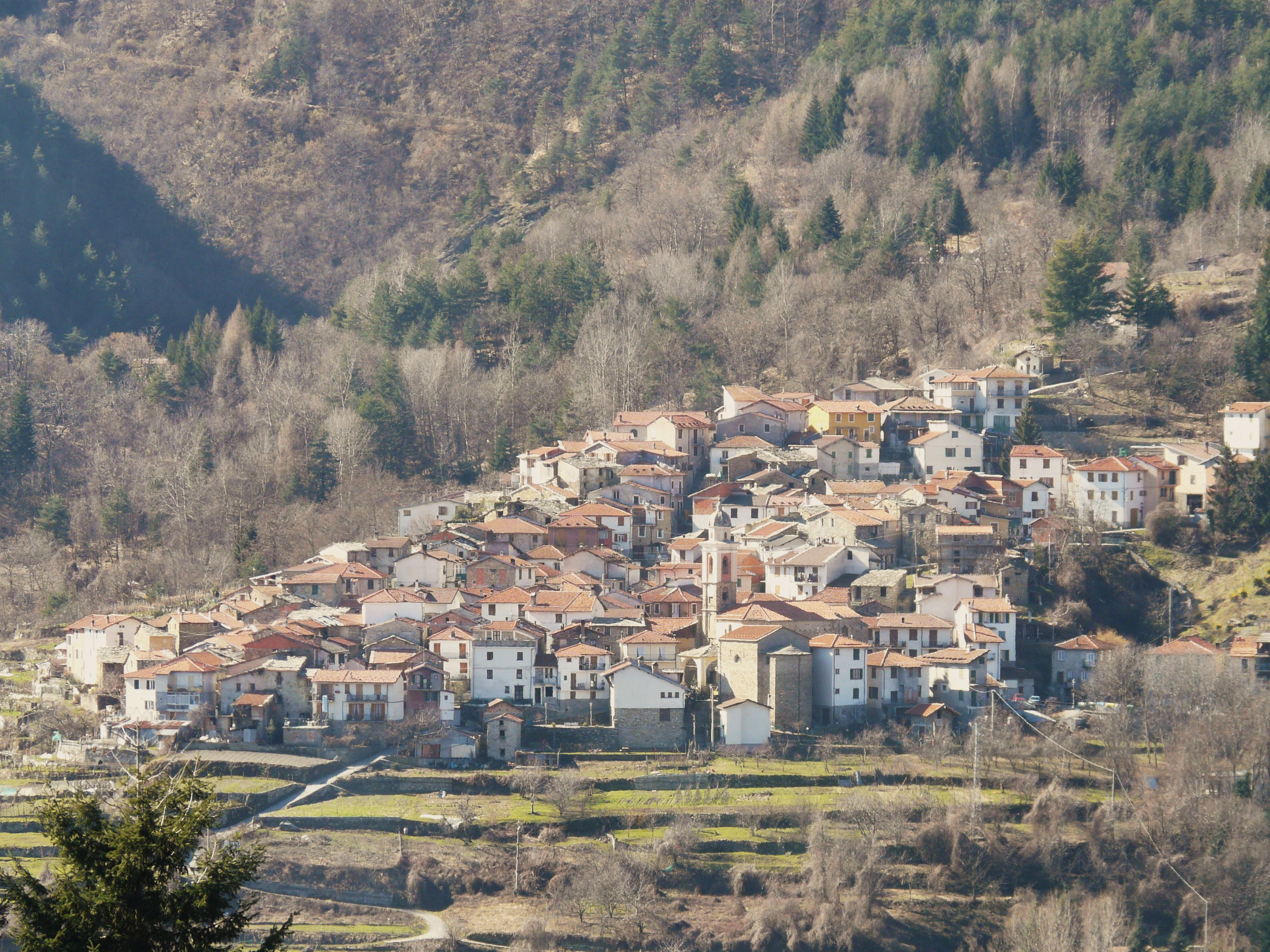
- View of Montegrosso Pian Latte

- Location within Italy Location within Liguria
- Coordinates: 44°4′N 7°49′E
- Country: Italy
- Region: Liguria
- Province: Province of Imperia (IM)
- Frazioni: Case Fascei

Area
  - Total: 10.2 km^{2} (3.9 sq mi)
- Elevation: 721 m (2,365 ft)

Population (Dec. 2004)
  - Total: 132
  - Density: 12.9/km^{2} (33.5/sq mi)
- Demonym(s): Bonello, Cordeglio, Toscano
- Time zone: UTC+1 (CET)
  - Summer (DST): UTC+2 (CEST)
- Postal code: 18023
- Dialing code: 0183

Montegrosso Pian Latte (Ligurian: Montegrosso Cian de Laite) is a comune (municipality) in the Province of Imperia in the Italian region Liguria, located about 100 kilometres (62 mi) southwest of Genoa and about 25 kilometres (16 mi) northwest of Imperia.

== Geography ==
As of 31 December 2004, Montegrosso Pian Latte had a population of 132 and an area of 10.2 square kilometres (3.9 mi^{2}).

The municipality of Montegrosso Pian Latte contains the frazione (subdivision) Case Fascei.

Montegrosso Pian Latte borders the following municipalities: Cosio di Arroscia, Mendatica, Molini di Triora, Pornassio, Rezzo, and Triora.

== Demographic evolution ==
Historical population

Year	Pop.	±%
1861	439	—
1871	466	+6.2%
1881	472	+1.3%
1901	384	−18.6%
1911	471	+22.7%

Year	Pop.	±%
1921	420	−10.8%
1931	372	−11.4%
1936	344	−7.5%
1951	280	−18.6%
1961	248	−11.4%

Year	Pop.	±%
1971	222	−10.5%
1981	189	−14.9%
1991	148	−21.7%
2001	140	−5.4%

Source: Data from ISTAT

== Twin towns and sister cities ==
Montegrosso Pian Latte is twinned with:

- Pontevès, France (2013)

== See also ==
- Parco naturale regionale delle Alpi Liguri
