= Impero (river) =

Italian river

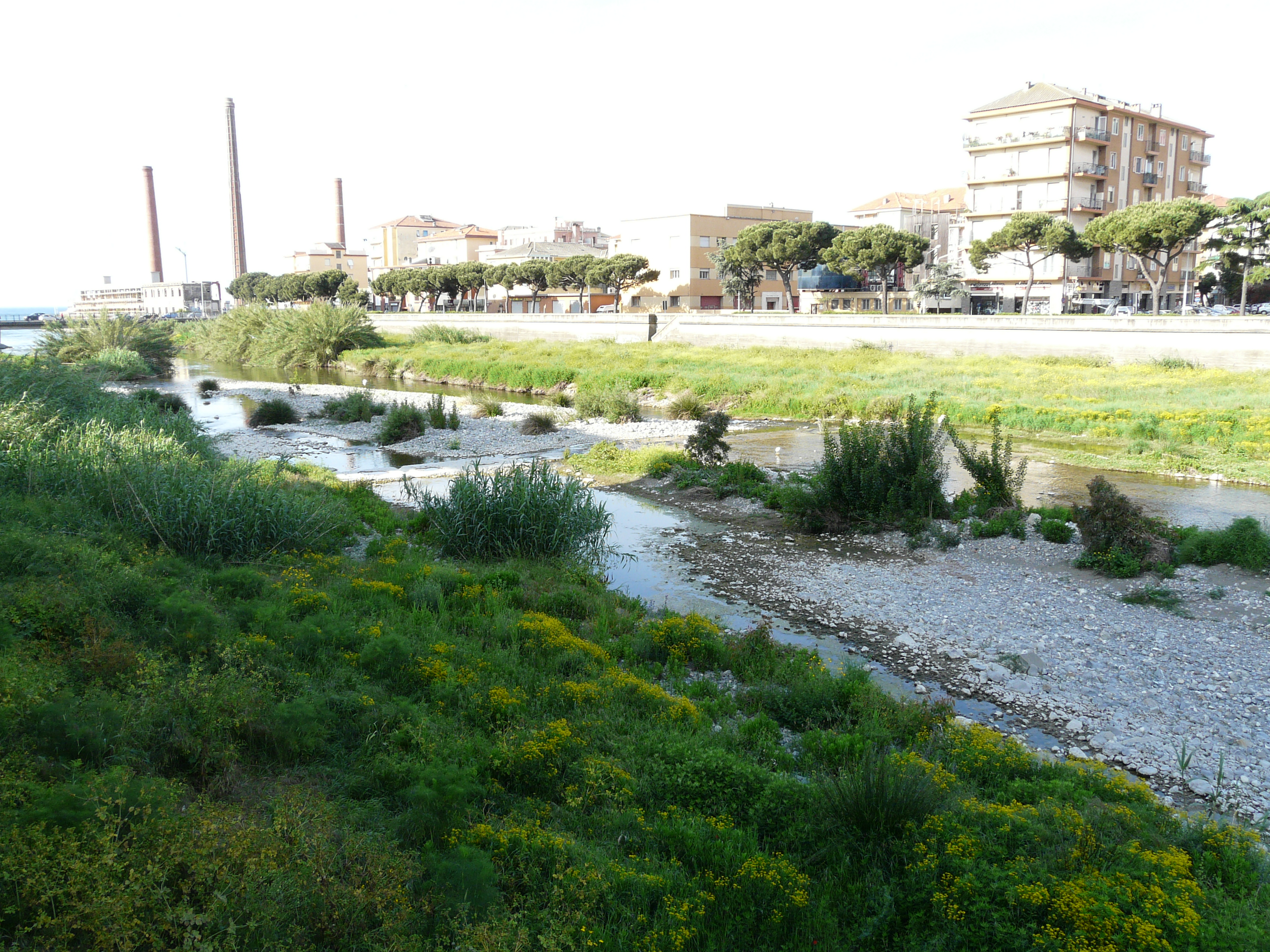
- The Impero in Oneglia

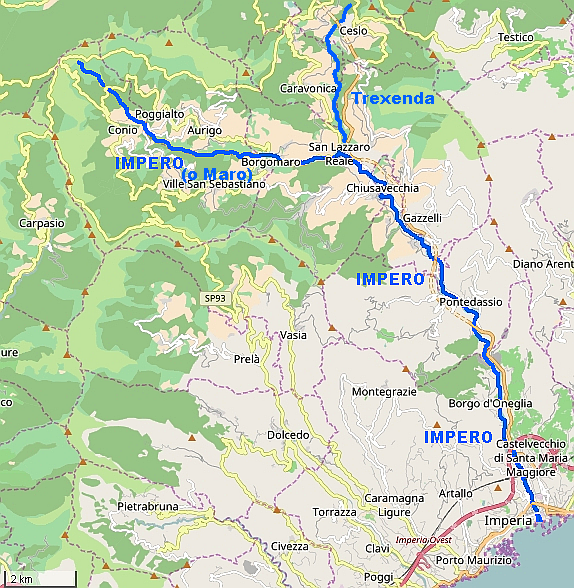

Location
- Country: Italy

Physical characteristics
- Source
  - location: Monte Grande (Ligurian Alps)
- Mouth: Ligurian Sea
  - location: Oneglia (IM)
  - coordinates: 43°53′09″N 8°02′14″E
  - elevation: 0 m (0 ft)
- Length: 22.4 km (13.9 mi)
- Basin size: 95 km^{2} (37 sq mi)

The Impero is a 22.4-kilometre (13.9 mi) stream of Liguria (Italy).

== Geography ==
The Impero rises near Monte Grande, crosses the comunes of Aurigo, Borgomaro, Lucinasco, Chiusavecchia, Chiusanico and Pontedassio, giving its name to its valley, and ends in the Ligurian Sea in Oneglia (IM).

Impero basin (95 km2) is totally included in the Province of Imperia and also encompasses the communes of Cesio and Caravonica.

== Main tributaries ==
=== Upper valley ===
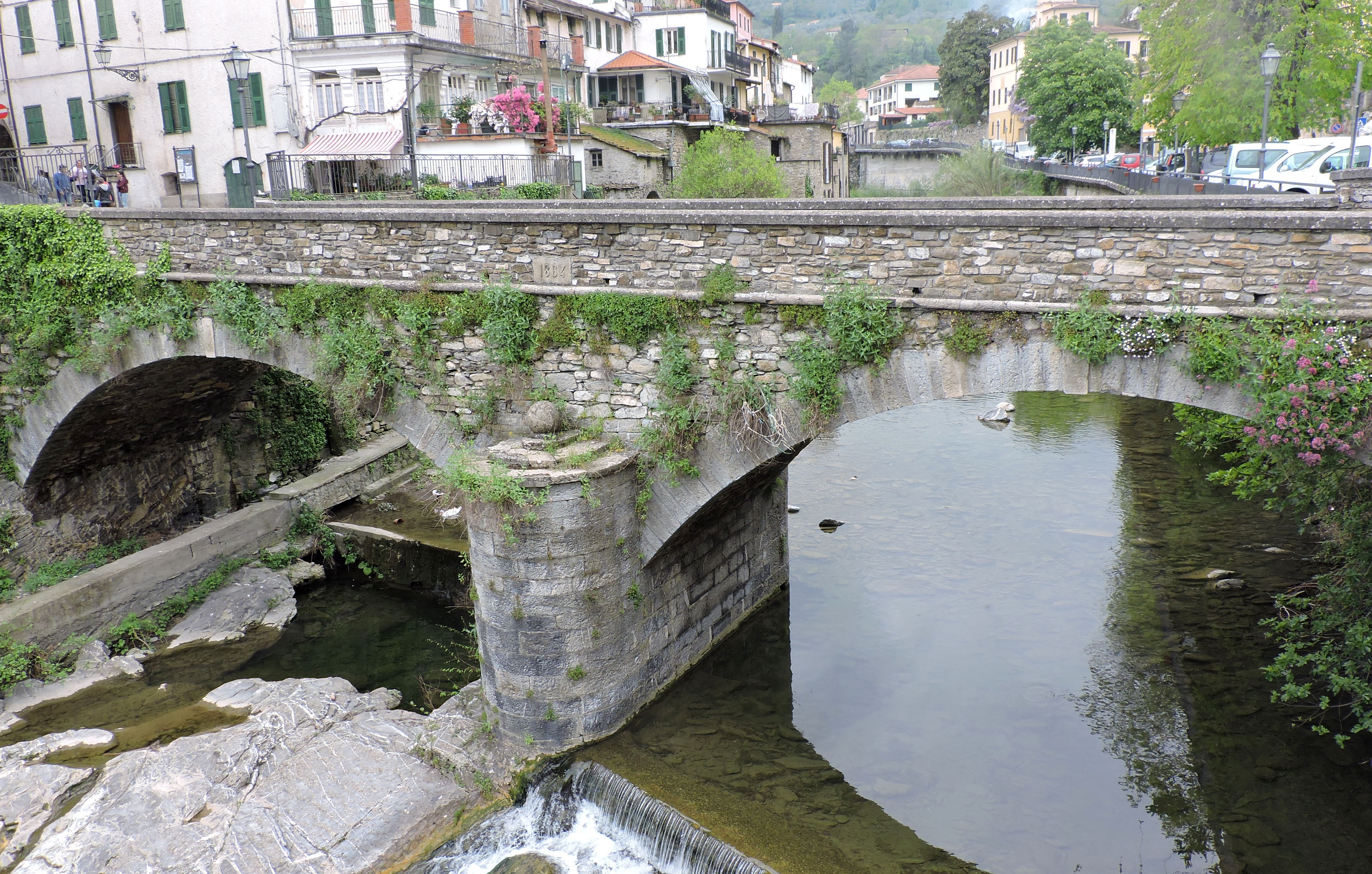
An old bridge on the Impero at Borgomaro

Upstream of the village of San Lazzaro Reale (Borgomaro) the Impero (sometimes referred as Maro in this stretch) receives the following tributaries:

- right hand:
  - rio Butasso,
  - rio Noceto,
  - rio Ponte,
  - rio Ciappa,
  - rio Rovera,
  - rio Pian Cappello
  - rio Fonti del Maro;
- left hand:
  - rio Calanche,
  - rio Lavandè,
  - rio Lacori.
  - rio Cardei.

=== Rio Trexenda ===
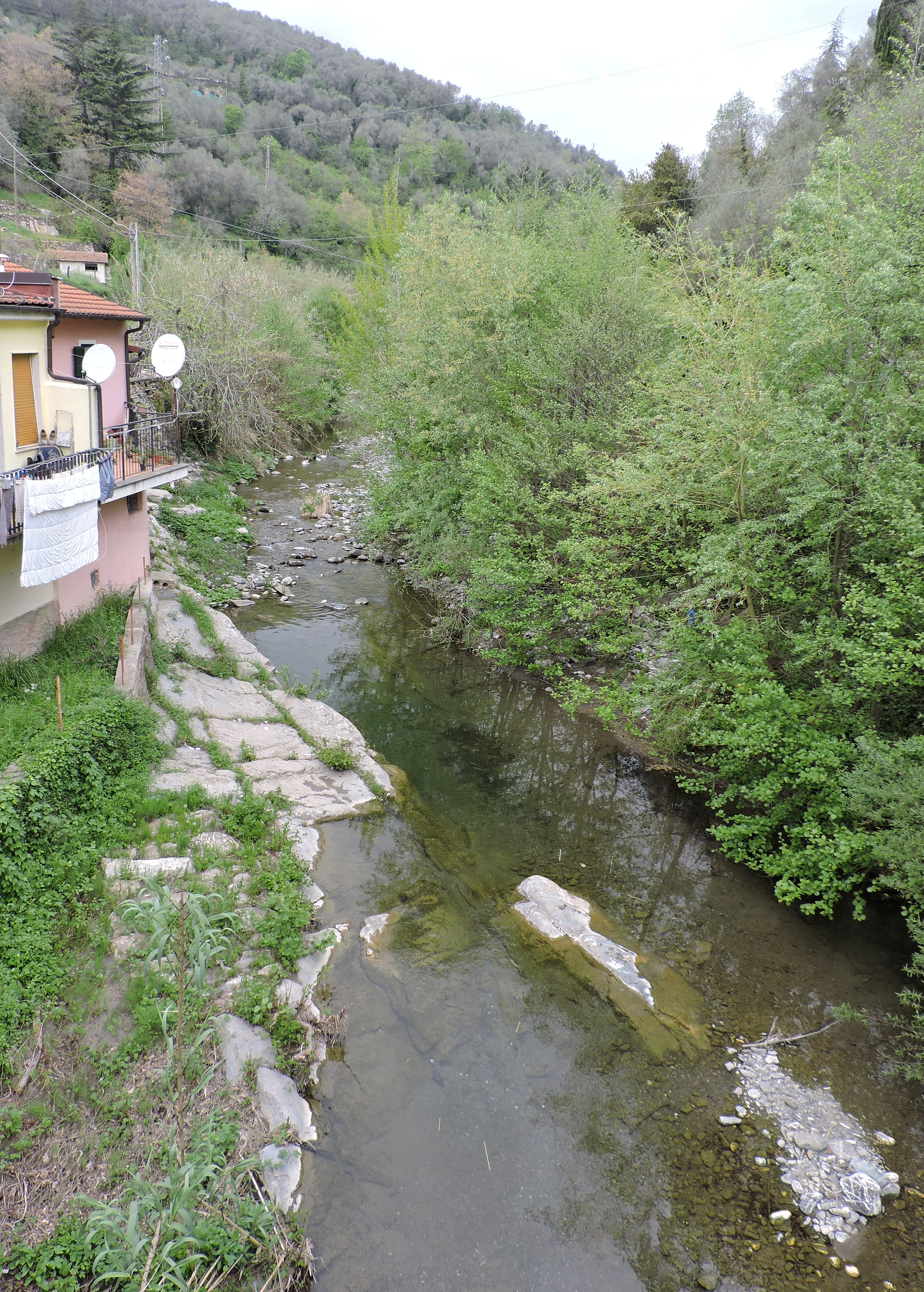
Trexenda near San Lazzaro

The Tresenda (or Trexenda) is the main tributary of the Impero; it rises with the name of rio Caravonica from monte Mucchio di Pietre and gets from its right bank Rio Bramoso and Rio Acquafredda. Its drainage basin is of 13.3 square kilometres.

=== Lower valley ===
Downstream San Lazzaro Reale, where it gets Tresenda waters, the Impero receives the following streams:

- right hand:
  - rio Maddalena,
  - rio Olivastri,
  - rio Baghi,
  - rio Delle Ville,
  - rio Ramà;
- left hand:
  - rio Lavandero,
  - rio Candelero,
  - rio Viesci,
  - rio Rocca.
  - rio Sgoreto.

== Fishing ==
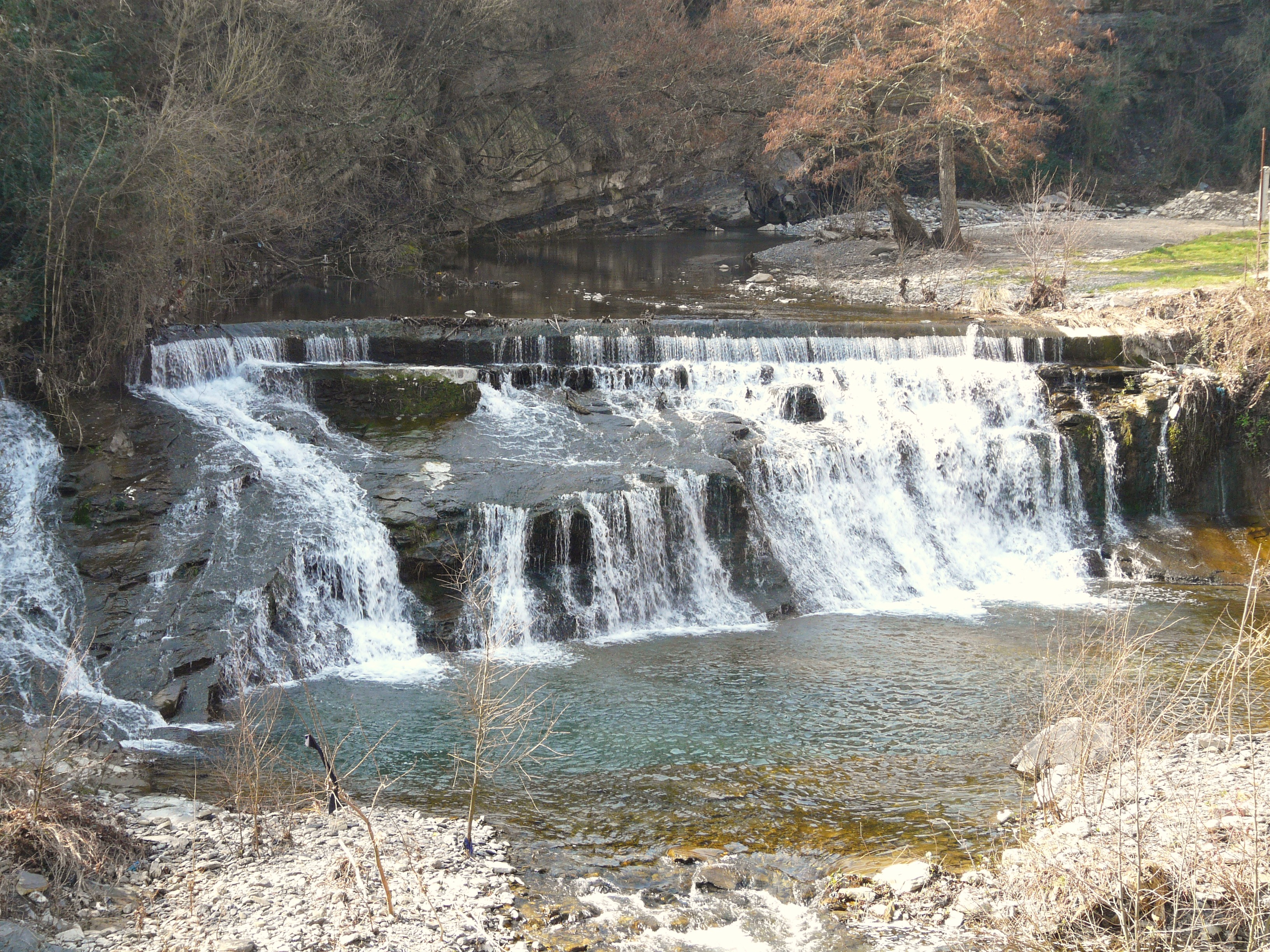
Impero waterfalls near Borgomaro

The Impero is not considered very interesting for fishing; upstream of Borgomaro trout coexist with cyprinids, while downstream the latter totally outnumber other fishes.

== See also ==
- List of rivers of Italy

Media related to Impero at Wikimedia Commons
