= Chiusa (disambiguation) =

Chiusa or Klausen is a municipality in South Tyrol, Italy.

Chiusa (Italian, 'closed' or 'lock') may also refer to several other municipalities in Italy:

- Chiusa di Pesio, in the Province of Cuneo, Piedmont
- Chiusa di San Michele, in the Province of Turin, Piedmont
- Chiusa Sclafani, in the Province of Palermo, Sicily
- Chiusaforte, in the Province of Udine, Friuli-Venezia Giulia
- Chiusavecchia, in der Province of Imperia, Liguria

== See also ==
- Chiusi, a municipality in the Province of Siena, Tuscany
- Chiusi della Verna, a municipality in the Province of Arezzo, Tuscany
