= Badalucco =

- Comune
- Comune di Badalucco
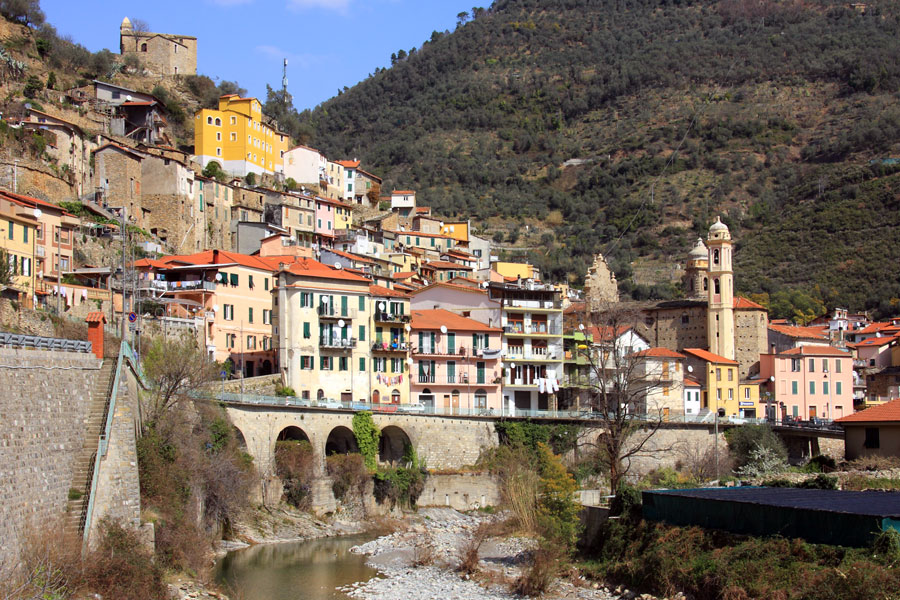
- View of Badalucco

- Location within Italy Location within Liguria
- Coordinates: 43°55′N 7°51′E
- Country: Italy
- Region: Liguria
- Province: Imperia (IM)

Government
  - Mayor: Matteo Orengo

Area
  - Total: 16.1 km^{2} (6.2 sq mi)
- Elevation: 179 m (587 ft)

Population (28 February 2017)
  - Total: 1,137
  - Density: 70.6/km^{2} (183/sq mi)
- Demonym: Badalucchesi
- Time zone: UTC+1 (CET)
  - Summer (DST): UTC+2 (CEST)
- Postal code: 18010
- Dialing code: 0184
- Website: Official website

Badalucco (Ligurian: Baaucco, locally Baraücu) is a comune (municipality) in the Province of Imperia in the Italian region Liguria, located about 100 kilometres (62 mi) southwest of Genoa and about 15 kilometres (9 mi) west of Imperia.

Badalucco borders the following municipalities: Bajardo, Ceriana, Dolcedo, Molini di Triora, Montalto Ligure, and Taggia. It is one of I Borghi più belli d'Italia ("The most beautiful villages of Italy").
