= Molini di Triora =

Molini di Triora Moin de Triêua
- Comune
- Comune di Molini di Triora
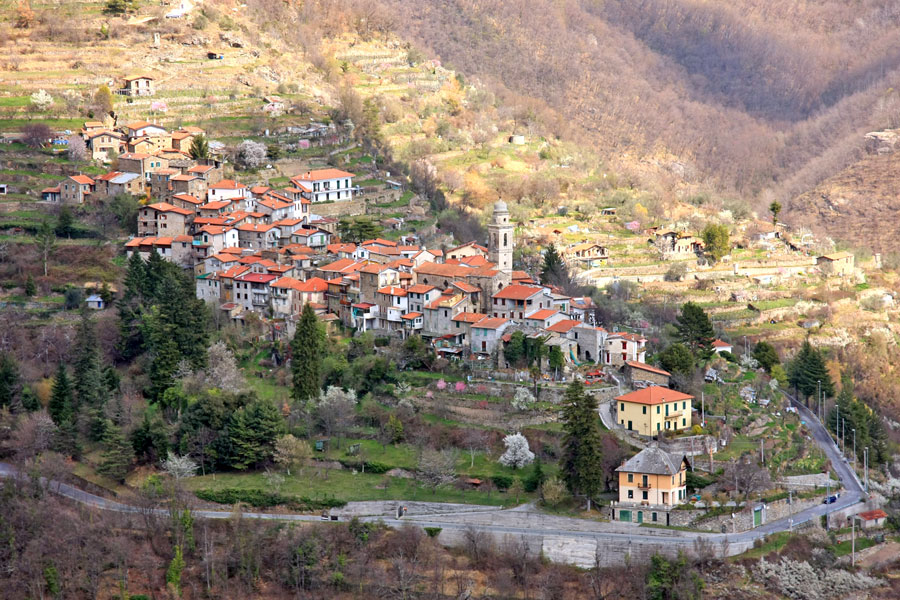
- View of Molini di Triora

- Location within Italy Location within Liguria
- Coordinates: 43°59′N 7°46′E
- Country: Italy
- Region: Liguria
- Province: Province of Imperia (IM)

Area
  - Total: 57.9 km^{2} (22.4 sq mi)

Population (Dec. 2004)
  - Total: 741
  - Density: 12.8/km^{2} (33.1/sq mi)
- Time zone: UTC+1 (CET)
  - Summer (DST): UTC+2 (CEST)
- Postal code: 18010
- Dialing code: 0184

Molini di Triora (Ligurian: Moin de Triêua) is a comune (municipality) in the Province of Imperia in the Italian region Liguria, located about 100 kilometres (62 mi) southwest of Genoa and about 25 kilometres (16 mi) northwest of Imperia. As of 31 December 2004, it had a population of 741 and an area of 57.9 square kilometres (22.4 mi^{2}).

Molini di Triora borders the following municipalities: Badalucco, Bajardo, Carpasio, Castelvittorio, Montalto Ligure, Montegrosso Pian Latte, Rezzo, and Triora.

== Demographic evolution ==
Historical population

Year	Pop.	±%
1861	3,032	—
1871	2,971	−2.0%
1881	3,207	+7.9%
1901	3,290	+2.6%
1911	3,157	−4.0%

Year	Pop.	±%
1921	3,272	+3.6%
1931	2,392	−26.9%
1936	2,118	−11.5%
1951	1,791	−15.4%
1961	1,461	−18.4%

Year	Pop.	±%
1971	1,111	−24.0%
1981	824	−25.8%
1991	726	−11.9%
2001	695	−4.3%

Source: Data from ISTAT

== Climate ==
The Köppen Climate Classification subtype for this climate is "Csb". (Mediterranean Climate).

== Persons linked to Molini ==
- Michael Green (painter and sculptor)
