= Montalto Carpasio =

- Comune
- Comune di Montalto Carpasio
- Coat of arms

- Location within Italy Location within Liguria
- Coordinates: 43°55′40″N 7°50′40″E
- Country: Italy
- Region: Liguria
- Province: Imperia (IM)

Government
  - Mayor: Fernando Colangelo

Area
  - Total: 30 km^{2} (12 sq mi)

Population (31 November 2017)
  - Total: 544
  - Density: 18/km^{2} (47/sq mi)
- Time zone: UTC+1 (CET)
  - Summer (DST): UTC+2 (CEST)
- Postal code: 18019
- Dialing code: 0184

Montalto Carpasio is a comune (municipality) in the Province of Imperia in the Italian region Liguria.

It was established on 1 January 2018 by the merger of the municipalities of Montalto Ligure and Carpasio.
