= Vasia =

- Comune
- Comune di Vasia
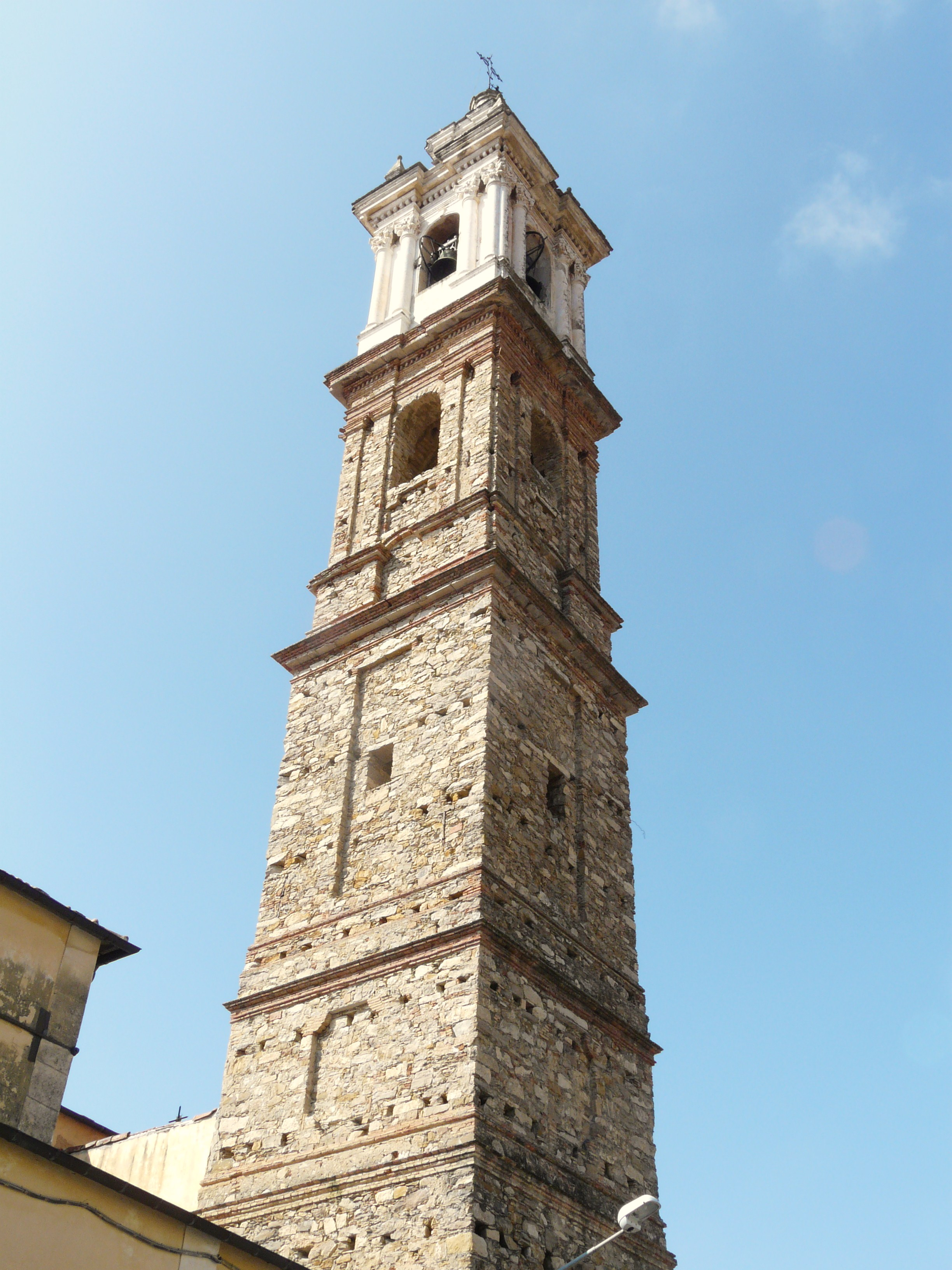
- Bell tower of the town's parish church.

- Coat of arms

- Location within Italy Location within Liguria
- Coordinates: 43°56′N 7°57′E
- Country: Italy
- Region: Liguria
- Province: Imperia (IM)

Government
  - Mayor: Mauro Casale

Area
  - Total: 11.15 km^{2} (4.31 sq mi)
- Elevation: 385 m (1,263 ft)

Population (31 December 2015)
  - Total: 389
  - Density: 34.9/km^{2} (90.4/sq mi)
- Demonym: Vasiesi
- Time zone: UTC+1 (CET)
  - Summer (DST): UTC+2 (CEST)
- Postal code: 18020
- Dialing code: 0183
- Website: Official website

Vasia is a comune (municipality) in the Province of Imperia in the Italian region Liguria, located about 100 kilometres (62 mi) southwest of Genoa and about 9 kilometres (6 mi) northwest of Imperia.

Vasia borders the following municipalities: Borgomaro, Dolcedo, Imperia, Lucinasco, Pontedassio, and Prelà.
