= Carpasio =

- Frazione
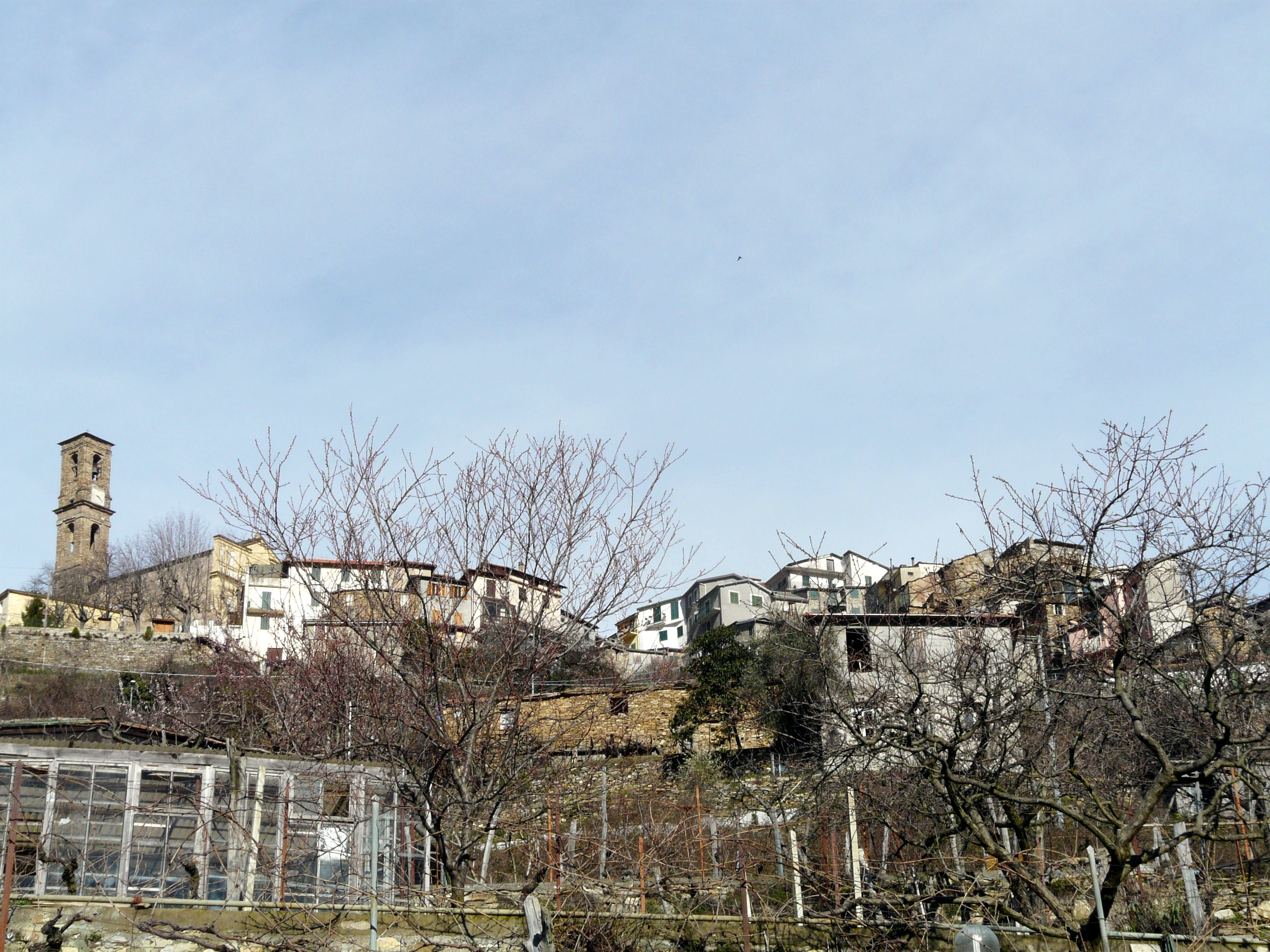
- View of Carpasio

- Location of Carpasio in Italy
- Coordinates: 43°58′N 7°52′E
- Country: Italy
- Region: Liguria
- Province: Province of Imperia (IM)
- Comune: Montalto Carpasio

Area
  - Total: 16.1 km^{2} (6.2 sq mi)

Population (Dec. 2004)
  - Total: 180
  - Density: 11/km^{2} (29/sq mi)
- Time zone: UTC+1 (CET)
  - Summer (DST): UTC+2 (CEST)
- Postal code: 18010
- Dialing code: 0184

Carpasio (Ligurian: Carpaxe) is a former comune (municipality) in the Province of Imperia in the Italian region Liguria, located about 100 kilometres (62 mi) southwest of Genoa and about 15 kilometres (9 mi) northwest of Imperia. As of 31 December 2004, it had a population of 180 and an area of 16.1 square kilometres (6.2 mi^{2}). At the beginning of 2018 Caprasio was unified with Montalto Ligure in the new comune of Montalto Carpasio.

Carpasio bordered the following municipalities: Borgomaro, Molini di Triora, Montalto Ligure, Prelà, and Rezzo.

== Demographic evolution ==
Historical population

Year	Pop.	±%
1861	950	—
1871	925	−2.6%
1881	991	+7.1%
1901	822	−17.1%
1911	931	+13.3%

Year	Pop.	±%
1921	707	−24.1%
1931	616	−12.9%
1936	585	−5.0%
1951	432	−26.2%
1961	370	−14.4%

Year	Pop.	±%
1971	274	−25.9%
1981	206	−24.8%
1991	181	−12.1%
2001	185	+2.2%

Source: Data from ISTAT

== Twin towns and sister cities ==
Carpasio is twinned with:

- Saorge, France (2006)
