= Dolcedo =

- Comune
- Comune di Dolcedo
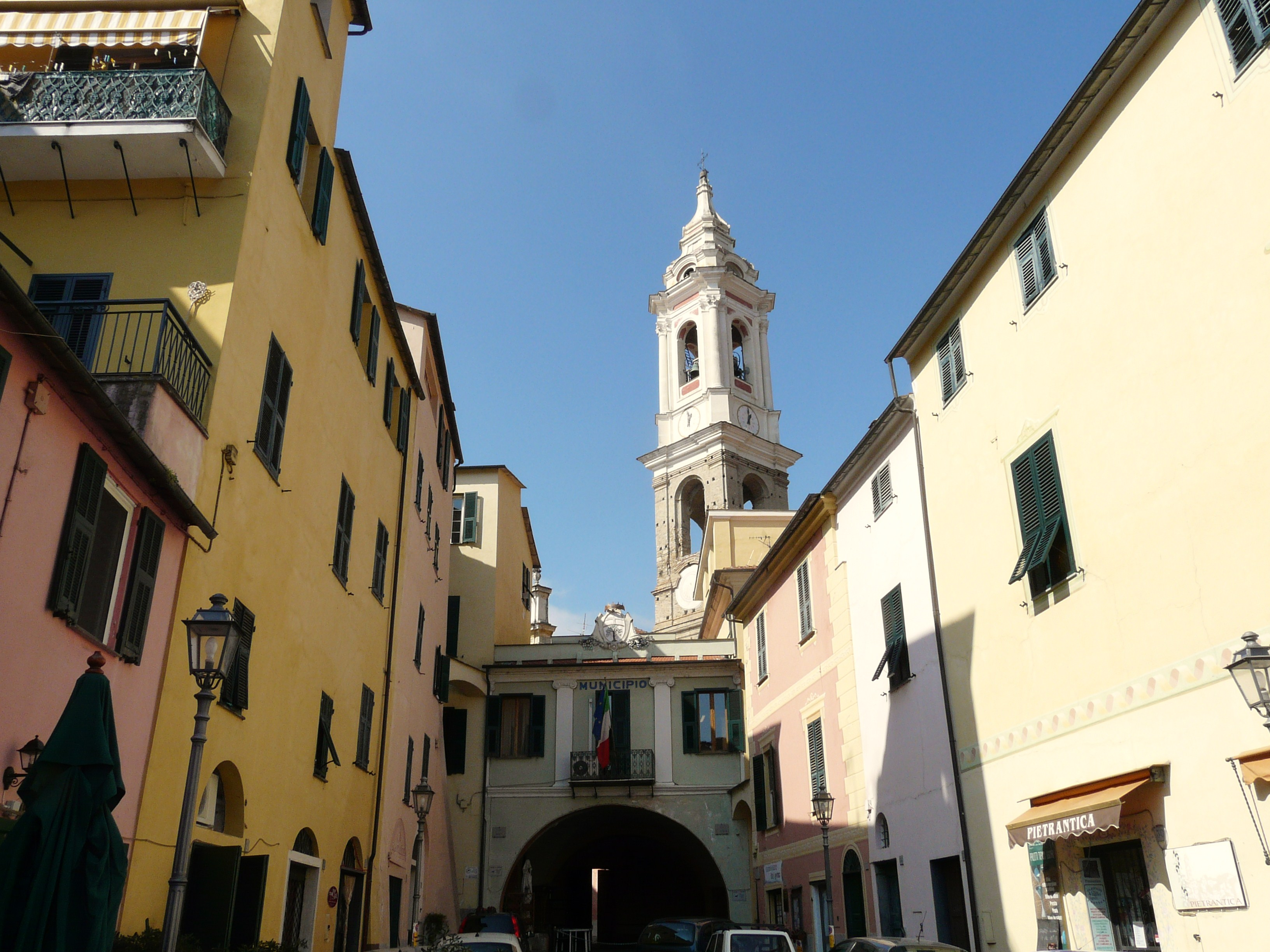
- Historical centre of Dolcedo

- Coat of arms

- Location within Italy Location within Liguria
- Coordinates: 43°54′N 7°57′E
- Country: Italy
- Region: Liguria
- Province: Imperia (IM)
- Frazioni: Bellissimi, Castellazzo, Costa Carnara, Isolalunga, Lecchiore, Magliani, Monte Faudo, Ripalta, Santa Brigida, Trincheri

Government
  - Mayor: Marco Ascheri

Area
  - Total: 19.32 km^{2} (7.46 sq mi)
- Elevation: 75 m (246 ft)

Population (Dec. 2004)
  - Total: 1,246
  - Density: 64.49/km^{2} (167.0/sq mi)
- Demonym: Dolcedesi
- Time zone: UTC+1 (CET)
  - Summer (DST): UTC+2 (CEST)
- Postal code: 18100
- Dialing code: 0183
- Patron saint: St. Thomas the Apostle
- Saint day: December 21
- Website: Official website

Dolcedo (Ligurian: Dôçeo, locally U Dusseu) is a comune (municipality) in the province of Imperia, in the Italian region of Liguria, located about 100 kilometres (62 mi) southwest of Genoa and about 7 kilometres (4 mi) northwest of Imperia.

The communal seat, Piazza, is located in the lower valley of the Prino stream. The other main centers are Isolalunga, Costa Carnara, Bellissimi and Lecchiore. Dolcedo borders the following municipalities: Badalucco, Civezza, Imperia, Montalto Ligure, Pietrabruna, Prelà, Taggia, and Vasia.

== History ==
The boroughs of Dolcedo appeared in the early Middle Ages, populated by refugees from the Ligurian coast. Later it was a fief of the Clavesana family. In the 12th century cultivation of olive became a mainstay of the area. In 1228 the Clavesana ceded their lands to the commune of Genoa.

== Main sights ==
- Parish church of St. Thomas, in Baroque style (1613).
- Medieval church of Santa Maria di Castellazzo.
- Sanctuary of Acquasanta.
- Oratory of St. Lawrence, with two small bell towers.
- Chapel of St. Brigida (15th century).

== Demographic evolution ==
Historical population

Year	Pop.	±%
1861	2,627	—
1871	2,711	+3.2%
1881	2,707	−0.1%
1901	2,026	−25.2%
1911	2,055	+1.4%

Year	Pop.	±%
1921	1,896	−7.7%
1931	1,689	−10.9%
1936	1,675	−0.8%
1951	1,542	−7.9%
1961	1,477	−4.2%

Year	Pop.	±%
1971	1,222	−17.3%
1981	1,158	−5.2%
1991	1,117	−3.5%
2001	1,193	+6.8%
2008	1,439	+20.6%

Source: Data from ISTAT

== See also ==
- Liguria wine
