= Montalto Ligure =

- Frazione
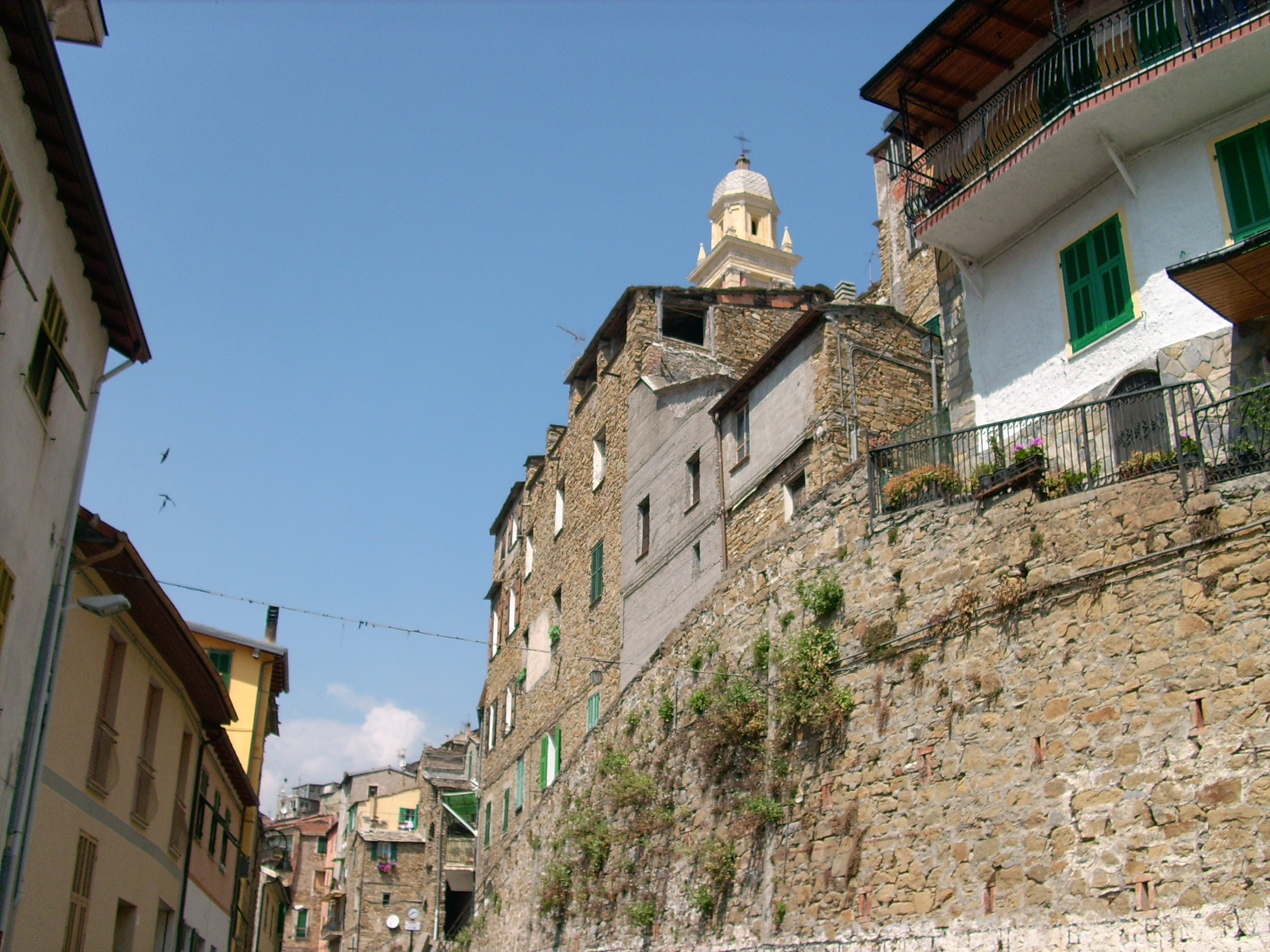
- Historical centre of Montalto Ligure

- Location of Montalto Ligure in Italy
- Coordinates: 43°55′N 7°50′E
- Country: Italy
- Region: Liguria
- Province: Province of Imperia (IM)
- Comune: Montalto Carpasio

Area
  - Total: 13.9 km^{2} (5.4 sq mi)

Population (Dec. 2004)
  - Total: 364
  - Density: 26.2/km^{2} (67.8/sq mi)
- Demonym: Montaltesi
- Time zone: UTC+1 (CET)
  - Summer (DST): UTC+2 (CEST)
- Postal code: 18010
- Dialing code: 0184

Montalto Ligure was a comune (municipality) in the Province of Imperia in the Italian region Liguria, located about 100 kilometres (62 mi) southwest of Genoa and about 15 kilometres (9 mi) west of Imperia. As of 31 December 2004, it had a population of 364 and an area of 13.9 square kilometres (5.4 mi^{2}). At the beginning of 2018 Montalto Ligure was unified with Carpasio in the new comune of Montalto Carpasio.

Montalto Ligure bordered the following municipalities: Badalucco, Carpasio, Dolcedo, Molini di Triora, and Prelà.

== Demographic evolution ==
Historical population

Year	Pop.	±%
1861	1,273	—
1871	1,307	+2.7%
1881	1,291	−1.2%
1901	1,236	−4.3%
1911	1,112	−10.0%

Year	Pop.	±%
1921	1,222	+9.9%
1931	861	−29.5%
1936	801	−7.0%
1951	658	−17.9%
1961	640	−2.7%

Year	Pop.	±%
1971	515	−19.5%
1981	442	−14.2%
1991	432	−2.3%
2001	388	−10.2%

Source: Data from ISTAT
