= Prelà =

- Comune
- Comune di Prelà
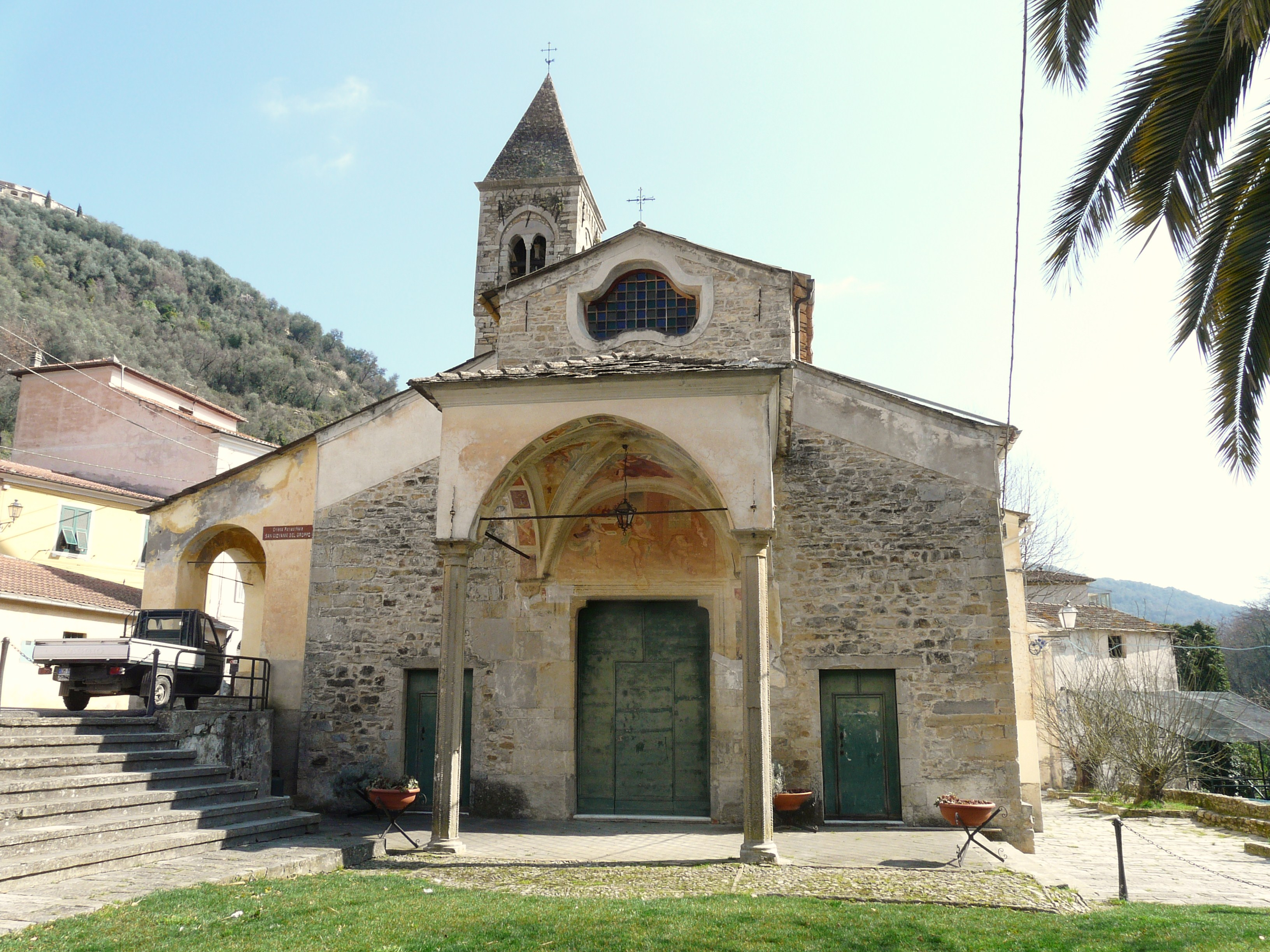
- San Giovanni del Grappo Church, Prelà

- Coat of arms

- Location within Italy Location within Liguria
- Coordinates: 43°56′N 7°57′E
- Country: Italy
- Region: Liguria
- Province: Province of Imperia (IM)

Area
  - Total: 15.4 km^{2} (5.9 sq mi)

Population (Dec. 2004)
  - Total: 497
  - Density: 32.3/km^{2} (83.6/sq mi)
- Time zone: UTC+1 (CET)
  - Summer (DST): UTC+2 (CEST)
- Postal code: 18020
- Dialing code: 0196

Prelà is a comune (municipality) in the Province of Imperia in the Italian region Liguria, located about 100 kilometres (62 mi) southwest of Genoa and about 9 kilometres (6 mi) northwest of Imperia. As of 31 December 2004, it had a population of 497 and an area of 15.4 square kilometres (5.9 mi^{2}).

Prelà borders the following municipalities: Borgomaro, Carpasio, Dolcedo, Montalto Ligure, and Vasia.

== Demographic evolution ==
Historical population

Year	Pop.	±%
1861	2,178	—
1871	2,235	+2.6%
1881	2,064	−7.7%
1901	1,729	−16.2%
1911	1,487	−14.0%

Year	Pop.	±%
1921	1,463	−1.6%
1931	1,197	−18.2%
1936	1,173	−2.0%
1951	1,070	−8.8%
1961	928	−13.3%

Year	Pop.	±%
1971	833	−10.2%
1981	649	−22.1%
1991	526	−19.0%
2001	480	−8.7%

Source: Data from ISTAT

== Twin towns and sister cities ==
Prelà is twinned with:

- Châteauneuf-Grasse, France (2005)
