= Borgomaro =

- Comune
- Comune di Borgomaro
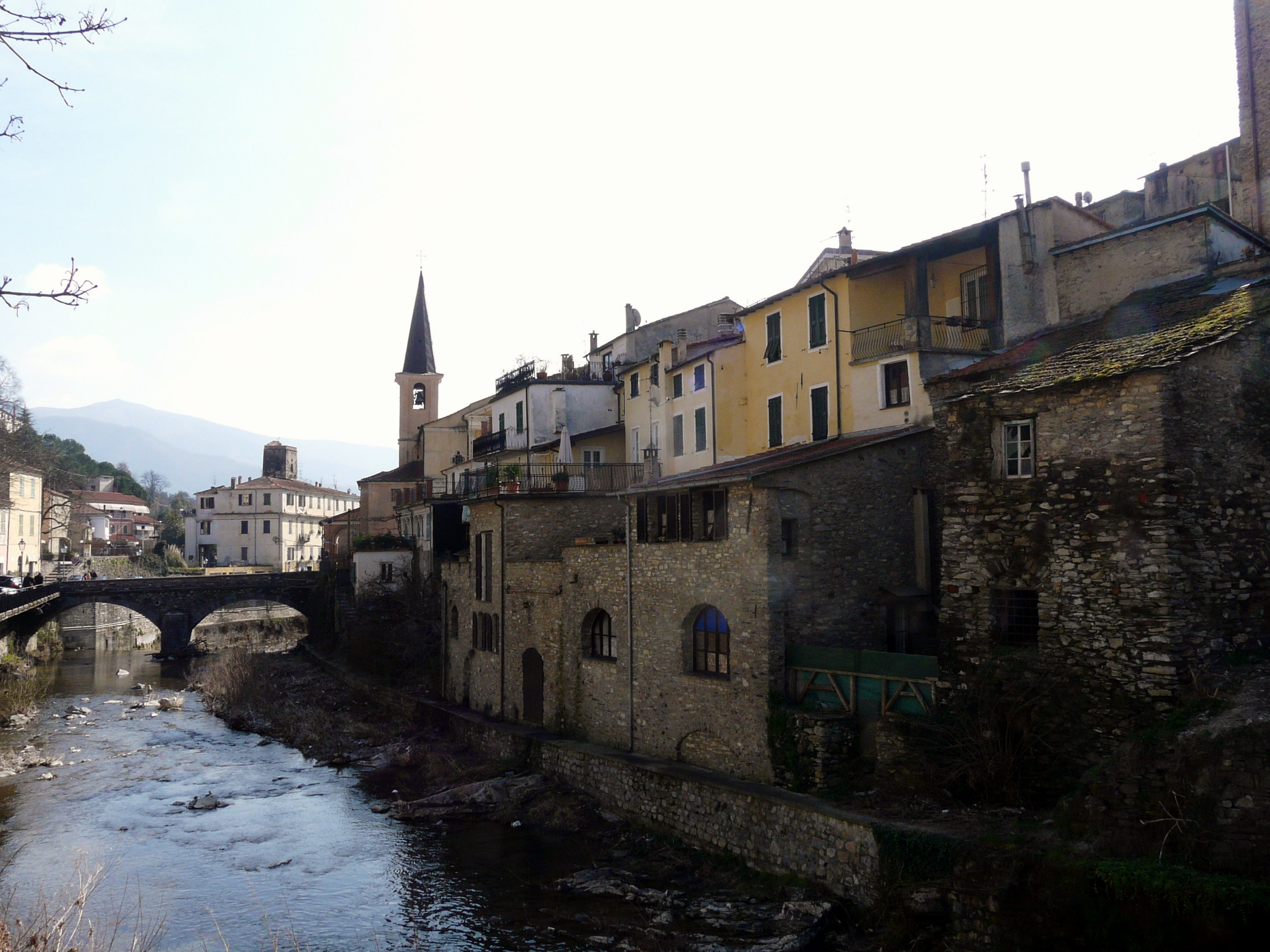
- Borgomaro: bridge on the Impero

- Location within Italy Location within Liguria
- Coordinates: 43°59′N 7°57′E
- Country: Italy
- Region: Liguria
- Province: Imperia (IM)

Government
  - Mayor: Massimiliano Mela

Area
  - Total: 23.44 km^{2} (9.05 sq mi)
- Elevation: 249 m (817 ft)

Population (30 April 2017)
  - Total: 892
  - Density: 38.1/km^{2} (98.6/sq mi)
- Demonym: Borgomaresi
- Time zone: UTC+1 (CET)
  - Summer (DST): UTC+2 (CEST)
- Postal code: 18021
- Dialing code: 0183
- Website: Official website

Borgomaro (Ligurian: Borgomâ, locally Burguma) is a comune (municipality) in the Province of Imperia in the Italian region Liguria, located about 90 kilometres (56 mi) southwest of Genoa and about 13 kilometres (8 mi) northwest of Imperia.

Borgomaro borders the following municipalities: Aurigo, Caravonica, Carpasio, Chiusanico, Lucinasco, Pieve di Teco, Prelà, Rezzo, and Vasia.
