= Caravonica =

Caravonica Caironega
- Comune
- Comune di Caravonica
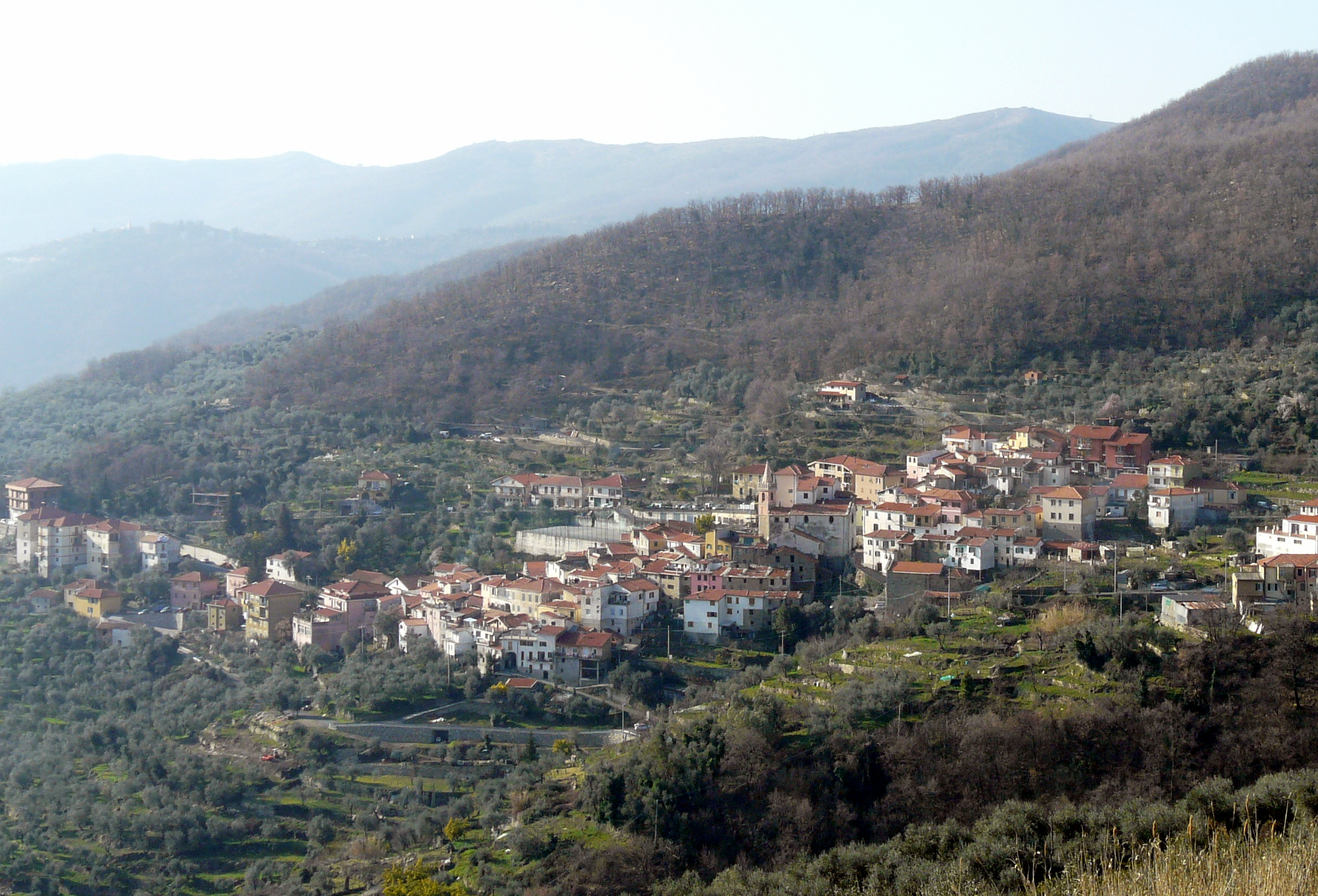
- View of Caravonica

- Location within Italy Location within Liguria
- Coordinates: 43°59′N 7°58′E
- Country: Italy
- Region: Liguria
- Province: Imperia (IM)

Government
  - Mayor: Angelo Francesco Dulbecco

Area
  - Total: 4.47 km^{2} (1.73 sq mi)
- Elevation: 360 m (1,180 ft)

Population (31 May 2022)
  - Total: 260
  - Density: 58/km^{2} (150/sq mi)
- Demonym: Caravonichesi
- Time zone: UTC+1 (CET)
  - Summer (DST): UTC+2 (CEST)
- Postal code: 18021
- Dialing code: 0183
- Website: Official website

Caravonica (Ligurian: Caironega) is a comune (municipality) in the Province of Imperia in the Italian region Liguria, located about 90 kilometres (56 mi) southwest of Genoa and about 12 kilometres (7 mi) northwest of Imperia.

Caravonica borders the following municipalities: Borgomaro, Cesio, Chiusanico, and Pieve di Teco.
