= Chiusanico =

- Comune
- Comune di Chiusanico
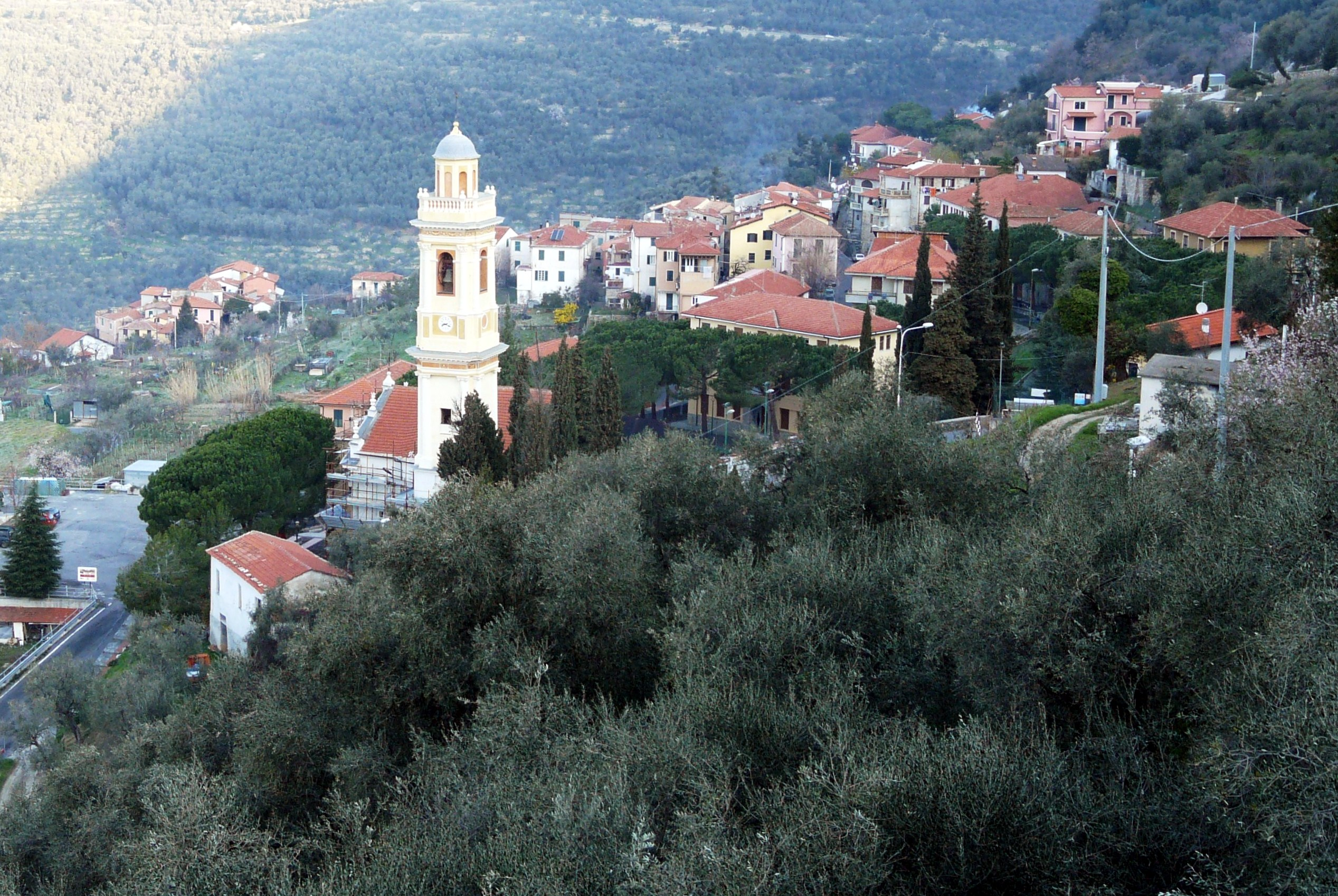
- View of Chiusanico

- Coat of arms

- Location within Italy Location within Liguria
- Coordinates: 43°58′N 8°0′E
- Country: Italy
- Region: Liguria
- Province: Imperia (IM)
- Frazioni: Torria, Gazzelli, Garsci, Zebbi

Government
  - Mayor: Nicia Tallone

Area
  - Total: 13.7 km^{2} (5.3 sq mi)
- Elevation: 380 m (1,250 ft)

Population (31 December 2010)
  - Total: 611
  - Density: 44.6/km^{2} (116/sq mi)
- Demonym: Chiusanichesi
- Time zone: UTC+1 (CET)
  - Summer (DST): UTC+2 (CEST)
- Postal code: 18027
- Dialing code: 0183

Chiusanico (Ligurian: Ciuxanego, locally Ciüxanegu) is a comune (municipality) in the Province of Imperia in the Italian region of Liguria, located about 90 kilometres (56 mi) southwest of Genoa and about 10 kilometres (6 mi) northwest of Imperia.

Chiusanico borders the following municipalities: Borgomaro, Caravonica, Cesio, Chiusavecchia, Diano Arentino, Lucinasco, Pontedassio, Stellanello, and Testico.

== Twin towns ==
- Vilobí del Penedès, Spain, since 2003
