= Lucinasco =

Lucinasco Lüxinascu
- Comune
- Comune di Lucinasco
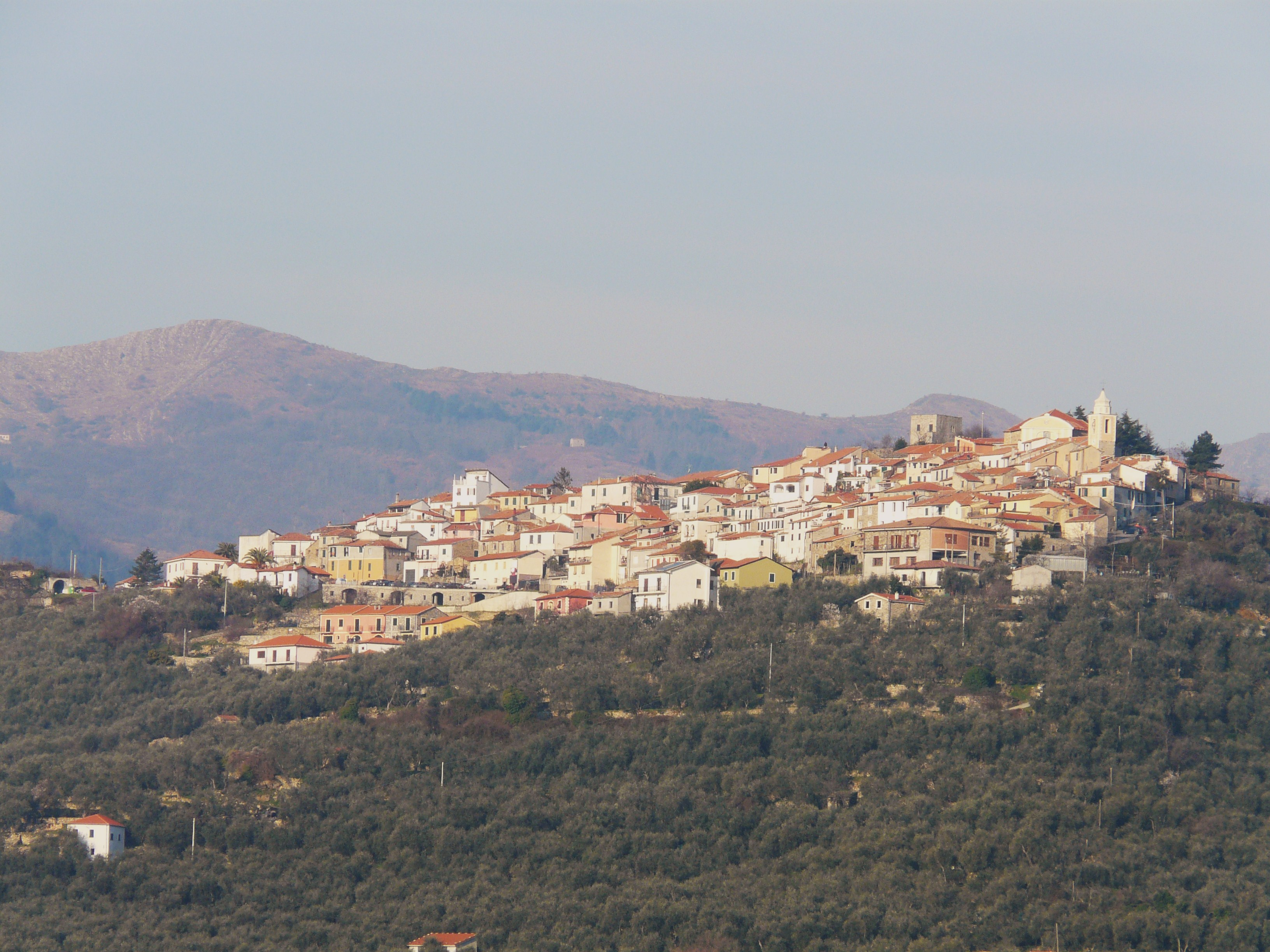
- View of Lucinasco

- Location within Italy Location within Liguria
- Coordinates: 43°58′N 7°58′E
- Country: Italy
- Region: Liguria
- Province: Province of Imperia (IM)
- Frazioni: Borgoratto

Area
  - Total: 8.2 km^{2} (3.2 sq mi)
- Elevation: 499 m (1,637 ft)

Population (Dec. 2004)
  - Total: 268
  - Density: 33/km^{2} (85/sq mi)
- Demonym: Lucinaschesi
- Time zone: UTC+1 (CET)
  - Summer (DST): UTC+2 (CEST)
- Postal code: 18020
- Dialing code: 0183

Lucinasco (Ligurian: Lücinascu) is a comune (municipality) in the Province of Imperia in the Italian region Liguria, located about 90 kilometres (56 mi) southwest of Genoa and about 11 kilometres (7 mi) northwest of Imperia. As of 31 December 2004, it had a population of 268 and an area of 8.2 square kilometres (3.2 mi^{2}).

The municipality of Lucinasco contains the frazione (subdivision) Borgoratto.

Lucinasco borders the following municipalities: Borgomaro, Chiusanico, Chiusavecchia, Pontedassio, and Vasia.

== Demographic evolution ==
Historical population

Year	Pop.	±%
1861	685	—
1871	730	+6.6%
1881	661	−9.5%
1901	689	+4.2%
1911	642	−6.8%

Year	Pop.	±%
1921	592	−7.8%
1931	468	−20.9%
1936	460	−1.7%
1951	431	−6.3%
1961	357	−17.2%

Year	Pop.	±%
1971	368	+3.1%
1981	296	−19.6%
1991	260	−12.2%
2001	274	+5.4%

Source: Data from ISTAT
