= Pontedassio =

- Comune
- Comune di Pontedassio
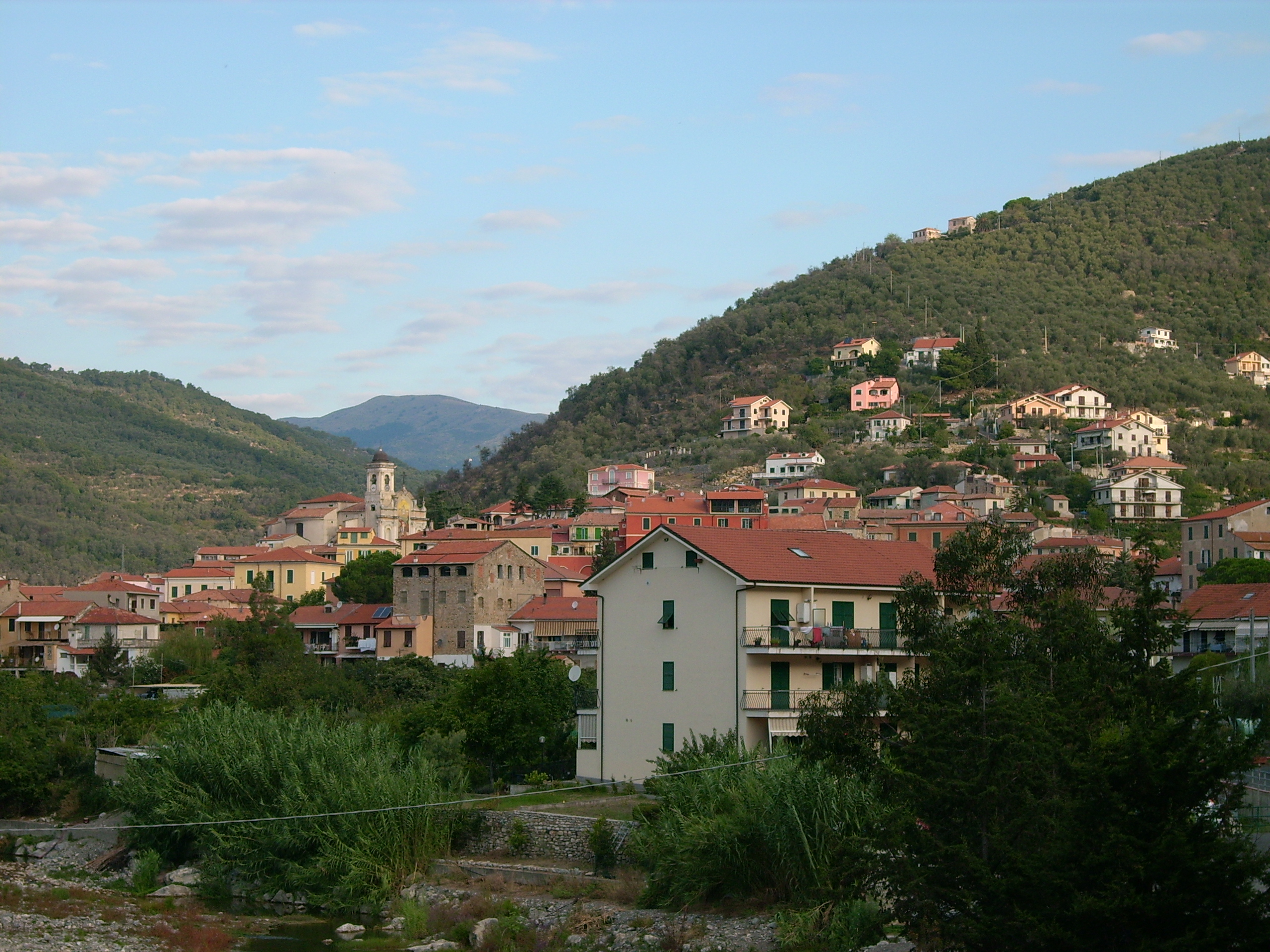
- View of Pontedassio

- Location within Italy Location within Liguria
- Coordinates: 43°56′N 8°1′E
- Country: Italy
- Region: Liguria
- Province: Province of Imperia (IM)

Area
  - Total: 14.5 km^{2} (5.6 sq mi)

Population (Dec. 2004)
  - Total: 2,159
  - Density: 149/km^{2} (386/sq mi)
- Demonym: Pontedassini
- Time zone: UTC+1 (CET)
  - Summer (DST): UTC+2 (CEST)
- Postal code: 18027
- Dialing code: 0183

Pontedassio (Ligurian: Puntedassce or Puntedasce) is a comune (municipality) in the Province of Imperia in the Italian region Liguria. It is situated about 90 kilometres (56 mi) southwest of Genoa and about 6 kilometres (4 mi) north of Imperia. As of December 31, 2004, it has a population of 2,159 and an area of 14.5 km^{2} (5.6 sq mi).

Pontedassio borders the following municipalities: Chiusanico, Chiusavecchia, Diano Arentino, Imperia, Lucinasco, and Vasia.

== Demographic evolution ==
Historical population

Year	Pop.	±%
1861	2,644	—
1871	2,779	+5.1%
1881	2,631	−5.3%
1901	2,298	−12.7%
1911	1,954	−15.0%

Year	Pop.	±%
1921	1,945	−0.5%
1931	2,008	+3.2%
1936	1,814	−9.7%
1951	1,807	−0.4%
1961	1,823	+0.9%

Year	Pop.	±%
1971	1,756	−3.7%
1981	1,639	−6.7%
1991	1,651	+0.7%
2001	2,002	+21.3%

Source: Data from ISTAT
