= Chiusavecchia =

Chiusavecchia Ciusaveia
- Comune
- Comune di Chiusavecchia
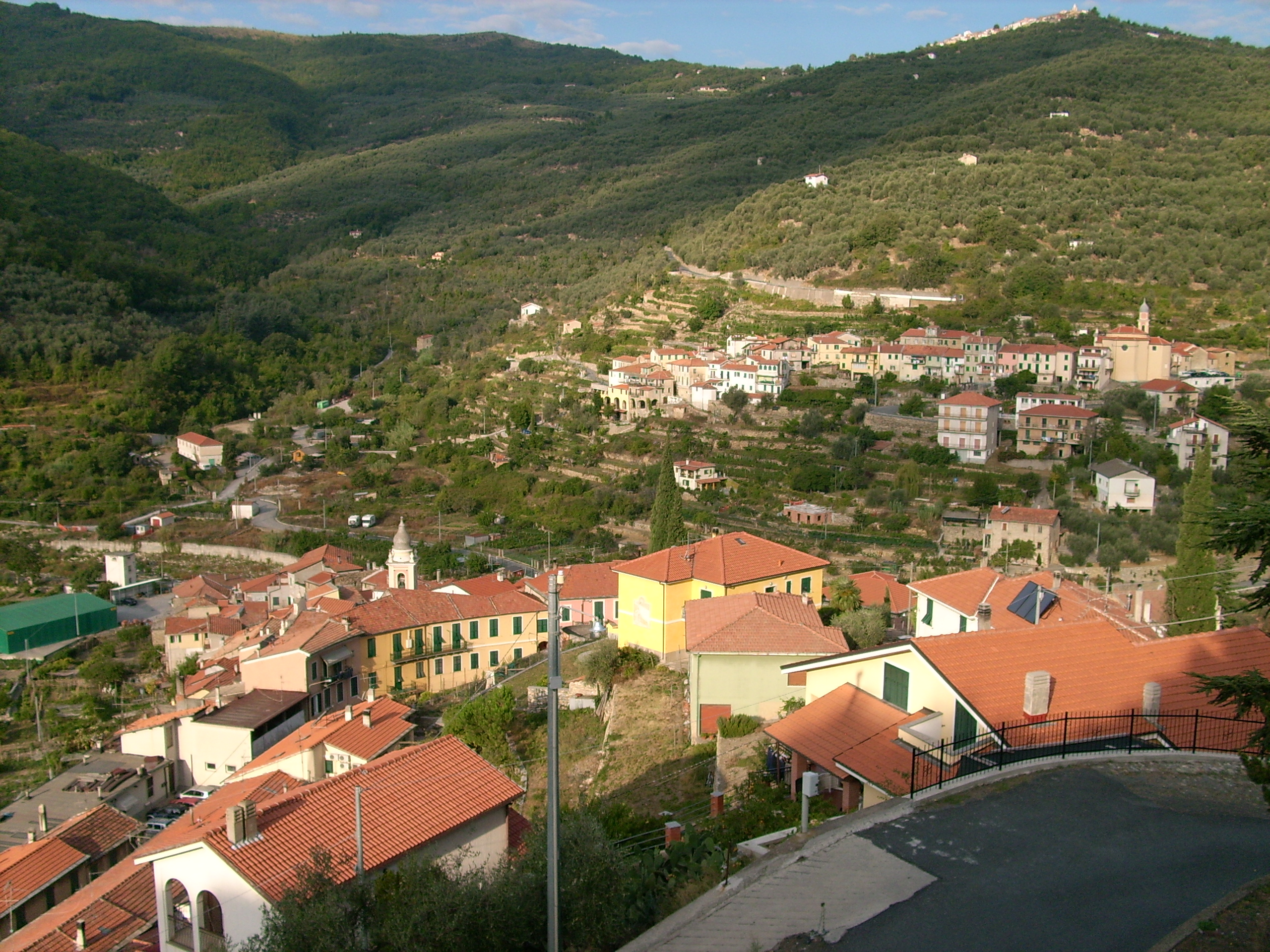
- View of Chiusavecchia

- Location within Italy Location within Liguria
- Coordinates: 43°58′N 7°59′E
- Country: Italy
- Region: Liguria
- Province: Province of Imperia (IM)
- Frazioni: Sarola

Area
  - Total: 3.3 km^{2} (1.3 sq mi)

Population (December 2004)
  - Total: 488
  - Density: 150/km^{2} (380/sq mi)
- Time zone: UTC+1 (CET)
  - Summer (DST): UTC+2 (CEST)
- Postal code: 18027
- Dialing code: 0183
- Patron saint: San Biagio
- Saint day: 3 February

Chiusavecchia (Ligurian: Ciusaveia) is a comune (municipality) in the Province of Imperia in the Italian region Liguria, located about 90 kilometres (56 mi) southwest of Genoa and about 10 kilometres (6 mi) northwest of Imperia. As of 31 December 2004, it had a population of 488 and an area of 3.3 square kilometres (1.3 mi^{2}).

The municipality of Chiusavecchia contains the frazione (subdivision) Zebbi.

Chiusavecchia borders the following municipalities: Chiusanico, Lucinasco, and Pontedassio.

== Demographic evolution ==
Historical population

Year	Pop.	±%
1861	681	—
1871	801	+17.6%
1881	744	−7.1%
1901	718	−3.5%
1911	682	−5.0%

Year	Pop.	±%
1921	678	−0.6%
1931	560	−17.4%
1936	565	+0.9%
1951	612	+8.3%
1961	546	−10.8%

Year	Pop.	±%
1971	455	−16.7%
1981	449	−1.3%
1991	408	−9.1%
2001	476	+16.7%

Source: Data from ISTAT
