= Princess Nina =

Princess Nina may refer to:

- Nina Menegatto (born 1978), Head of State of the Principality of Seborga
- Princess Nina Georgievna of Russia (1901–1974), member of the Russian imperial family
- Princess Nina of Greece and Denmark (born 1987), member of the former Greek royal family
