= Vallebona =

Vallebona Valebona
- Comune
- Comune di Vallebona
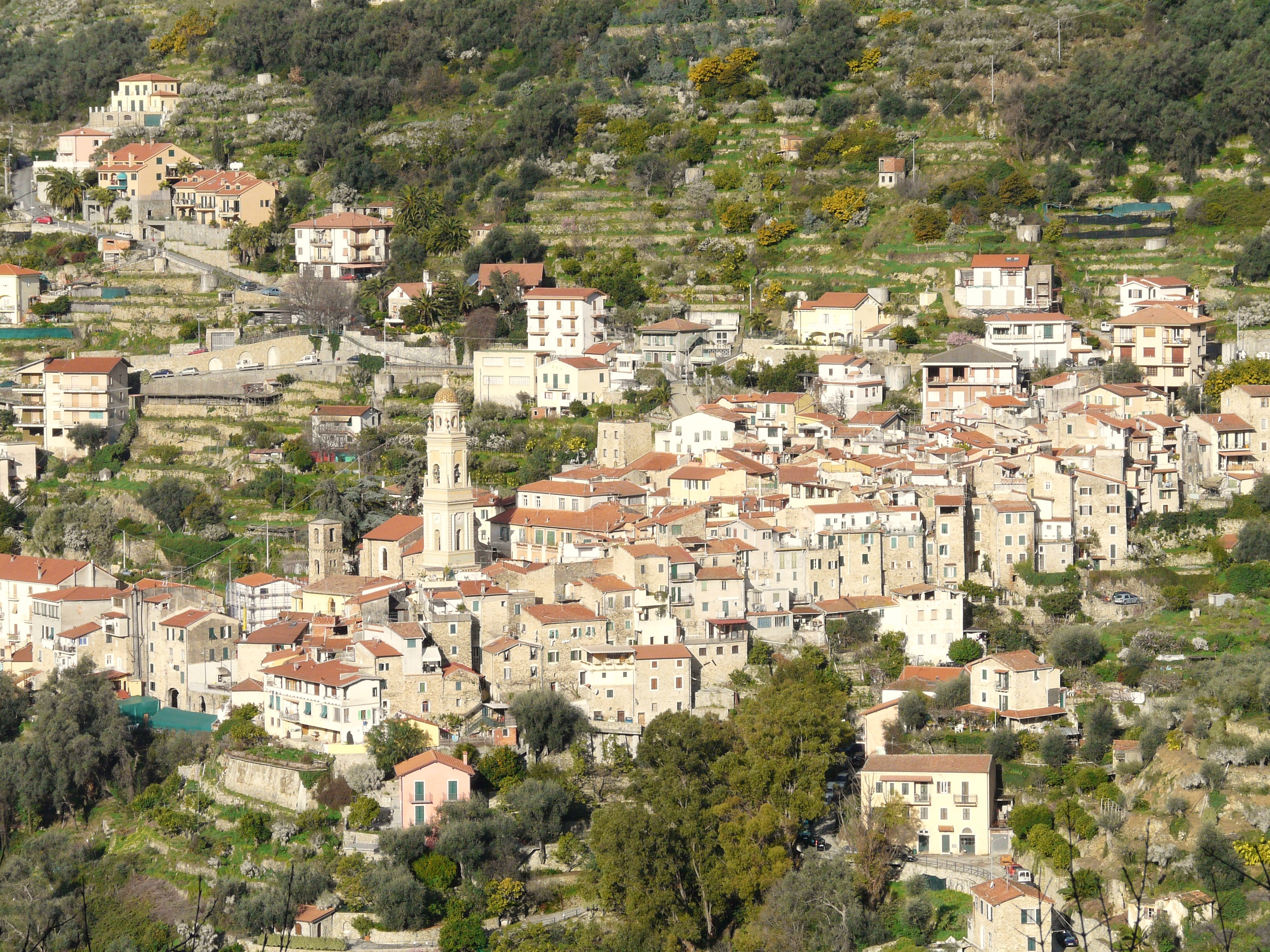
- View of Vallebona

- Coat of arms

- Location within Italy Location within Liguria
- Coordinates: 43°49′N 7°40′E
- Country: Italy
- Region: Liguria
- Province: Imperia (IM)

Government
  - Mayor: Roberta Guglielmi

Area
  - Total: 6.0 km^{2} (2.3 sq mi)
- Elevation: 149 m (489 ft)

Population (31 December 2015)
  - Total: 1,310
  - Density: 220/km^{2} (570/sq mi)
- Demonym: Vallebonesi
- Time zone: UTC+1 (CET)
  - Summer (DST): UTC+2 (CEST)
- Postal code: 18012
- Dialing code: 0184
- Website: Official website

Vallebona (Ligurian: Valebona) is a comune (municipality) in the Province of Imperia in the Italian region Liguria, located about 120 kilometres (75 mi) southwest of Genoa and about 30 kilometres (19 mi) west of Imperia. Vallebona borders the following municipalities: Bordighera, Ospedaletti, Perinaldo, San Biagio della Cima, Seborga, Soldano, and Vallecrosia.

== History ==
On 20 April 1686, the representants of eight villages, Camporosso, Vallebona, Vallecrosia, San Biagio della Cima, Sasso, Soldano, Borghetto San Nicolò and Bordighera had a meeting in order to build what they called "Magnifica Comunità degli Otto Luoghi", which can be translated as: "The magnificent community of the eight villages". Their goal was to gain independence from the nearby rival city of Ventimiglia.
