= Sasso di Bordighera =

- Frazione
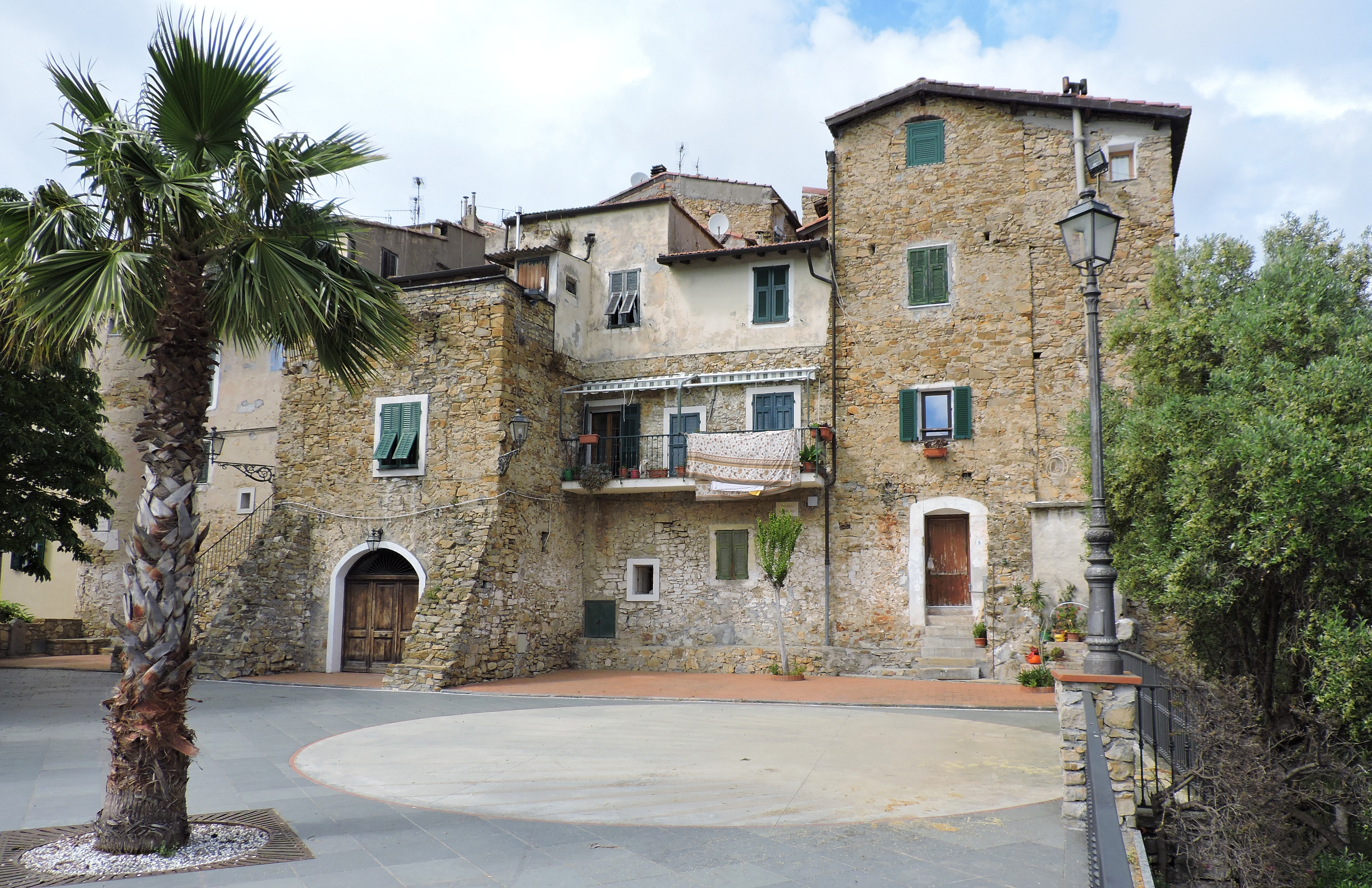
- Village centre

- Location of Sasso di Bordighera in Italy
- Coordinates: 43°48′14.09″N 7°40′18.36″E
- Country: Italy
- Region: Liguria
- Province: Imperia (IM)
- Comune: Bordighera
- Elevation: 219 m (719 ft)

Population (2001)Istat - 14º Censimento generale della popolazione e delle abitazioni
  - Total: 212
- Time zone: UTC+1 (CET)
  - Summer (DST): UTC+2 (CEST)
- Postal code: 18012
- Dialing code: (+39) 0184

Sasso di Bordighera is a frazione (and parish) of the municipality of Bordighera, in Liguria, northern Italy.

== Geography ==
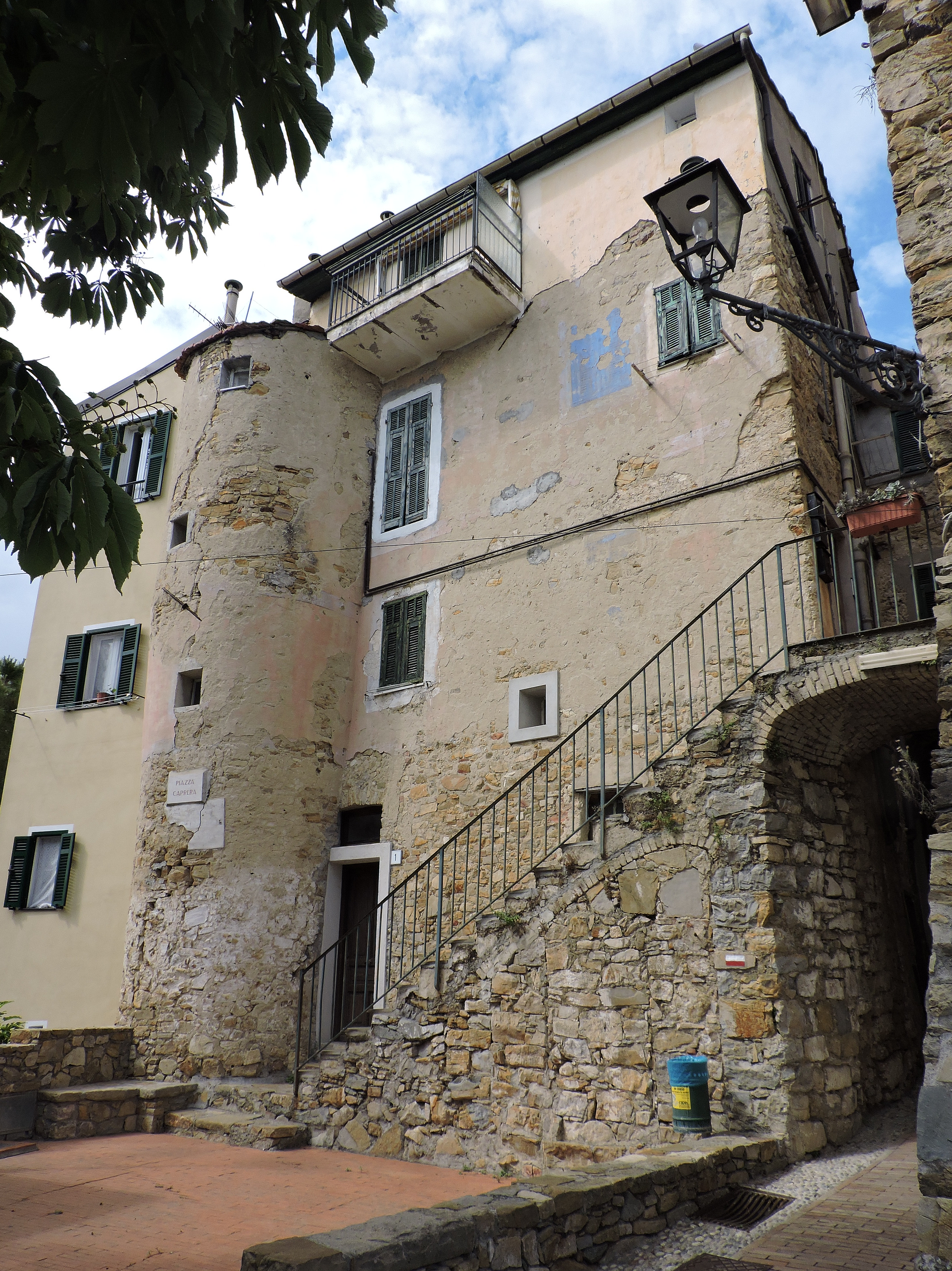
Medioeval house

Sasso di Bordighera is located on a hilly ridge dividing the short valleys of Borghetto (west) and Sasso streams. ,

== History ==
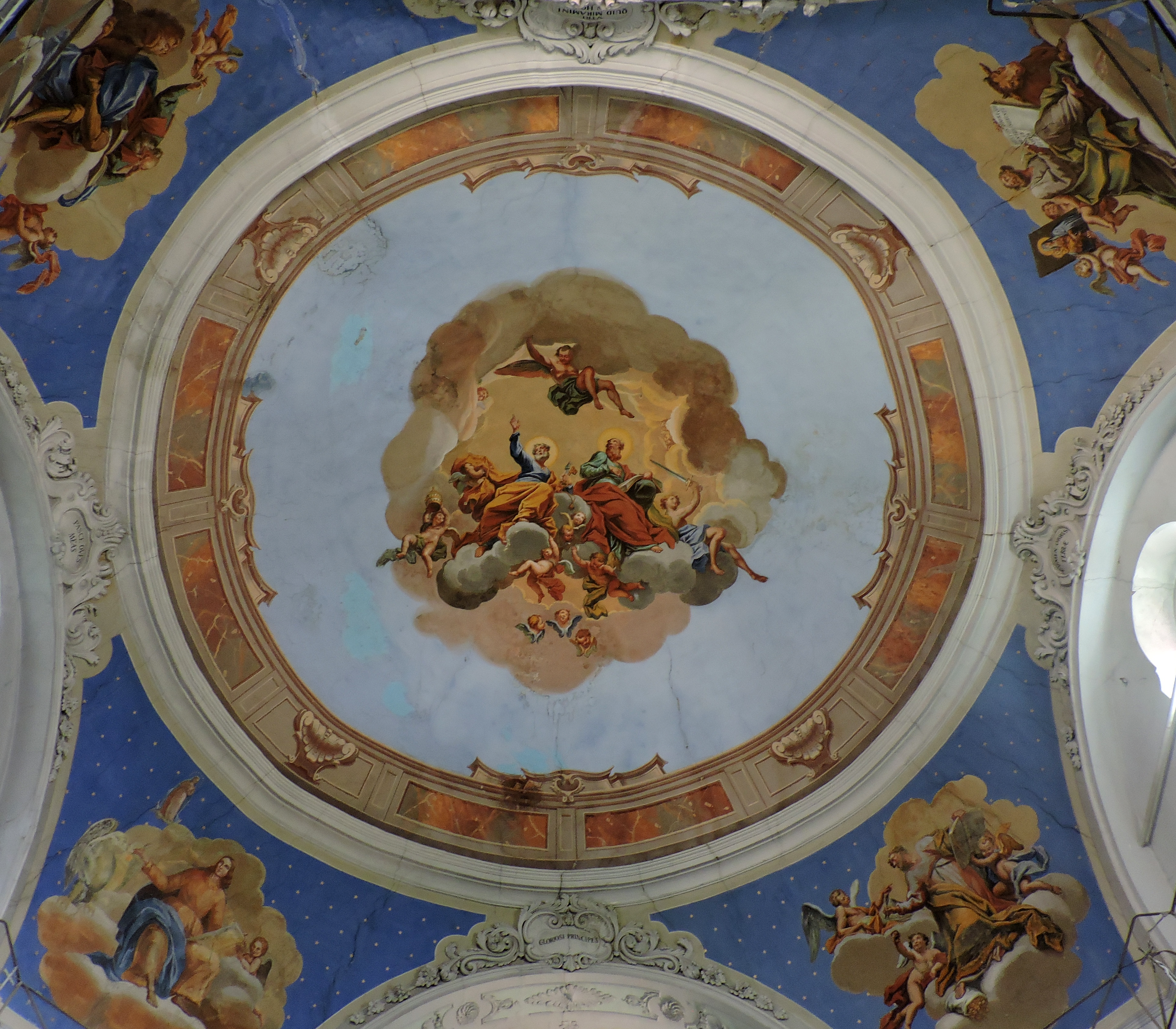
Parish church vault

Sasso di Bordighera was founded, following a local tradition, by the inhabitants of the neighbouring city of Taggia. The village is located on a rocky summit and its oldest part is made of tower-shaped houses. On the 21st of April 1686, the representants of eight villages, Camporosso, Vallebona, Vallecrosia, San Biagio della Cima, Sasso, Soldano, Borghetto San Nicolò and Bordighera had a meeting in order to build what they called "Magnifica Comunità degli Otto Luoghi", which can be translated as: "The magnificent community of the eight villages". Their goal was to gain independence from the nearby rival city of Ventimiglia. At the beginning of the 20th century Sasso was linked to the coast with a new road which, starting from Bordighera, continues up to Seborga.

Sasso di Bordighera was a separate comune (municipality) until 1928 when, with Borghetto San Nicolò (which also was an autonomous municipality) was joined with Bordighera.

== Bibliography ==
- Amati, Amato (1869). Dizionario corografico dell'Italia. Vol. 7. Milano: Vallardi. p. 280.
- Altavilla, Raffaele (1875). Il regno d'Italia: dizionario geografico - storico -statistico. Torino: A.F.Negro. p. 692.
