= Francesco Maria da Camporosso =

Italian Roman Catholic saint

Saint Francesco Maria da Camporosso O.F.M. Cap.

Religious
- Born: 27 December 1804; Camporosso, Ligurian Republic
- Died: 17 September 1866 (aged 61); Genoa, Kingdom of Italy
- Venerated in: Roman Catholic Church
- Beatified: 30 June 1929, Saint Peter's Basilica, Vatican City by Pope Pius XI
- Canonized: 9 December 1962, Saint Peter's Basilica, Vatican City by Pope John XXIII
- Feast: 19 September
- Attributes: Capuchin habit
- Patronage: Camporosso

Francesco Maria da Camporosso (27 December 1804 - 17 September 1866) - born Giovanni Croese - was an Italian Roman Catholic professed religious from the Order of Friars Minor Capuchin. Croese became a beggar in Genoa where he sought alms from people and was at first heckled and assaulted before his reputation for personal holiness spread which prompted people to come and see him.

The cause for his sainthood commenced on 9 August 1896 under Pope Leo XIII while Pope Pius XI titled him as Venerable on 18 December 1922 and later beatified him on 30 June 1929. Pope John XXIII canonized him as a saint on 9 December 1962 inside Saint Peter's Basilica.

== Life ==
Giovanni Croese was born on 27 December 1804 in Camporosso to Anselmo Croese and Maria Antonia Garza and he received his baptism on 29 December in his local parish church. In his childhood he helped his father with the farm work. He received his First Communion in 1816 on the feast of Corpus Christi.

On 14 October 1822 he approached the Order of Friars Minor Capuchin as a postulant and in the fall of 1824 at Voltri assumed a new name for himself. In 1825 he entered the novitiate with the order at their convent of Saint Barnabas in the hills of Genoa. He entered it and said: "I came to the convent to be its beast of burden"; he commenced his novitiate period on 7 December 1825. Croese was vested in the habit on 17 December 1825. In 1826 - after the novitiate - he was sent to the convent of the Immaculate Conception close to the center of Genoa and to the port area. It was there in 1834 that he was appointed as the "quaestor" or alms collector for that area and he dedicated his life to collecting donations for the support of the friars and their charitable works; in 1840 he was made the friars' chief beggar who would also help look after the other friars that went out begging. But at the start of this venture he was often heckled and even assailed with stones for this and he would respond in picking up the stones thrown at him and kissing them as a sign of forgiveness. The friar often said that he was more blessed in giving than in receiving while providing help and comfort to all those in need through disseminating merciful love to all and examples of virtue amongst the workers and the poor people of the port. The friar spent countless hours kneeling in solemn reflection before the Eucharist.

In an epidemic of cholera sometime in August 1866 he gave his help to the victims of the plague but soon contracted the disease himself and died not too long after. The Genoese people called him - and continue to call him - "Padre Santo" due to his holiness. His remains rest in a chapel at the Immaculate Conception convent since being transferred there in 1911.

== Sainthood ==
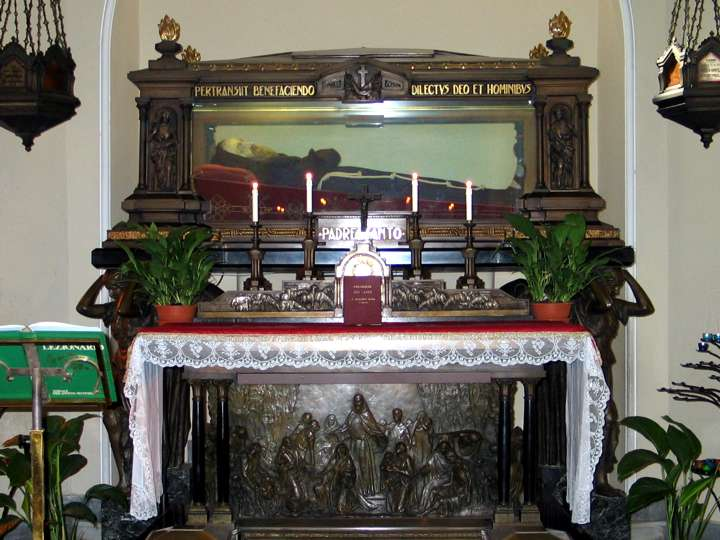
Remains housed in a chapel at the Immaculate Conception church in Genoa (2006).

The sainthood process commenced under Pope Leo XIII on 9 August 1896 in which the late Franciscan friar was named as a Servant of God. Pope Pius XI confirmed that he had lived a life of heroic virtue on 18 December 1922 and so named him as Venerable. The same pope later approved two miracles attributed to his intercession, and beatified him on 30 June 1929. The cause for his sainthood was opened on 30 March 1931, and the confirmation of two more additional miracles allowed for Pope John XXIII to canonize the friar on 9 December 1962.
