= Soldano, Liguria =

Soldano Soudàn/Saudàn
- Comune
- Comune di Soldano
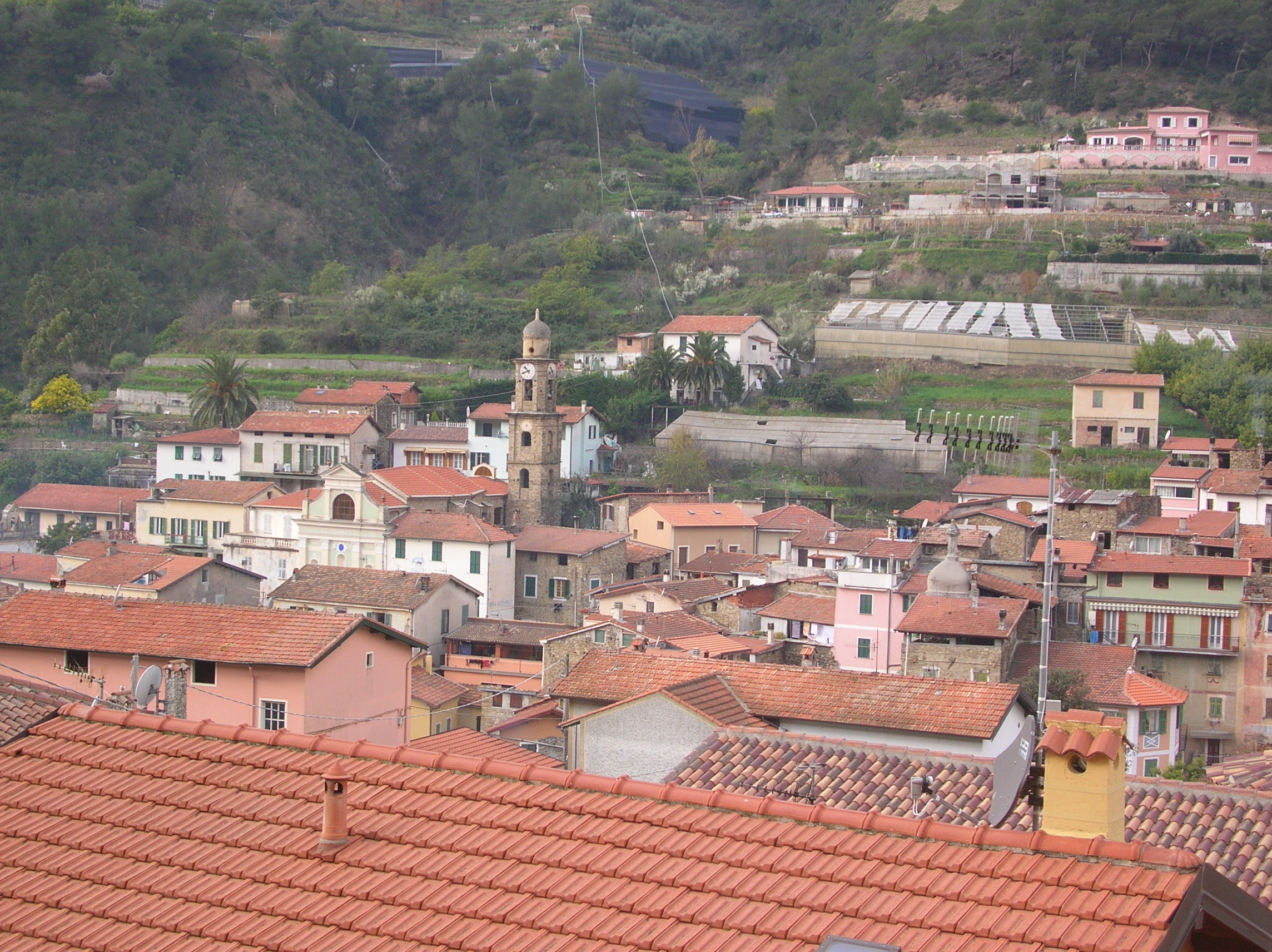
- View of Soldano

- Location within Italy Location within Liguria
- Coordinates: 43°50′N 7°39′E
- Country: Italy
- Region: Liguria
- Province: Imperia (IM)
- Frazioni: San Martino

Area
  - Total: 3.58 km^{2} (1.38 sq mi)
- Elevation: 80 m (260 ft)

Population (31 May 2007)
  - Total: 879
  - Density: 246/km^{2} (636/sq mi)
- Demonym: Soldanelli
- Time zone: UTC+1 (CET)
  - Summer (DST): UTC+2 (CEST)
- Postal code: 18036
- Dialing code: 0184
- Patron saint: John the Baptist
- Saint day: 24 June

Soldano (Ligurian: Soudàn/Saudàn) is a town and comune in the province of Imperia, Liguria (Italy).

== History ==
On 21 April 1686, the representants of eight villages, Camporosso, Vallebona, Vallecrosia, San Biagio della Cima, Sasso, Soldano, Borghetto San Nicolò and Bordighera had a meeting in order to build what they called "Magnifica Comunità degli Otto Luoghi", which can be translated as: "The magnificent community of the eight villages". Their goal was to gain independence from the nearby rival city of Ventimiglia.
