= Borghetto San Nicolò =

- Frazione
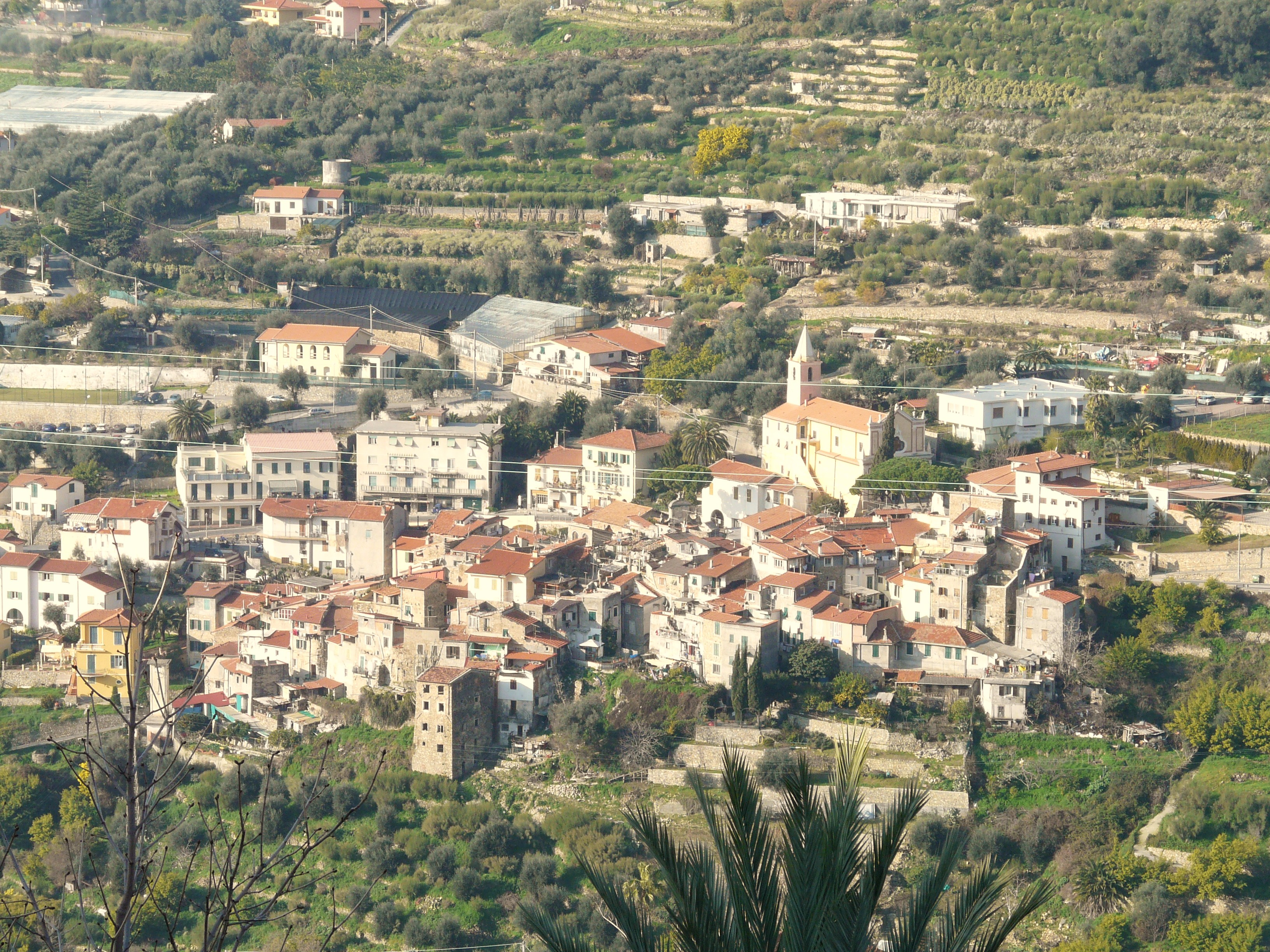
- Overall view

- Location of Borghetto San Nicolò in Italy
- Coordinates: 43°48′17.72″N 7°39′37.28″E
- Country: Italy
- Region: Liguria
- Province: Imparia (IM)
- Comune: Bordighera
- Elevation: 90 m (300 ft)

Population (2001)Istat - 14º Censimento generale della popolazione e delle abitazioni
  - Total: 312
- Time zone: UTC+1 (CET)
  - Summer (DST): UTC+2 (CEST)
- Postal code: 18012
- Dialing code: (+39) 0184
- Patron saint: Saint Nicholas
- Saint day: 6 December

Borghetto San Nicolò is a frazione (and parish) of the municipality of Bordighera, in Liguria, northern Italy.

== Geography ==
Borghetto San Nicolò is located on the right banks of the torrente Borghetto. Its centre in at 90 metres AMSL.

== History ==
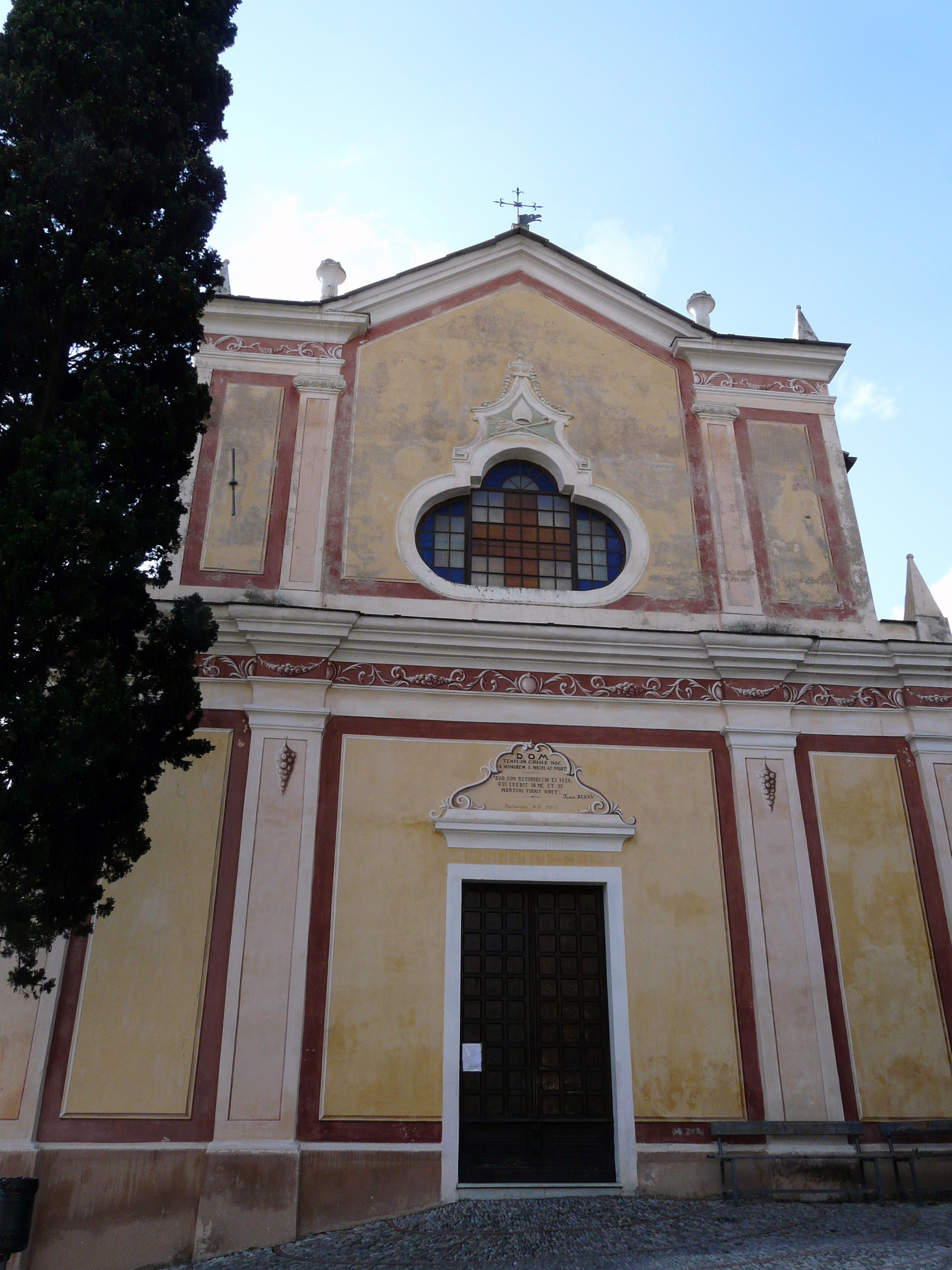
Parish church

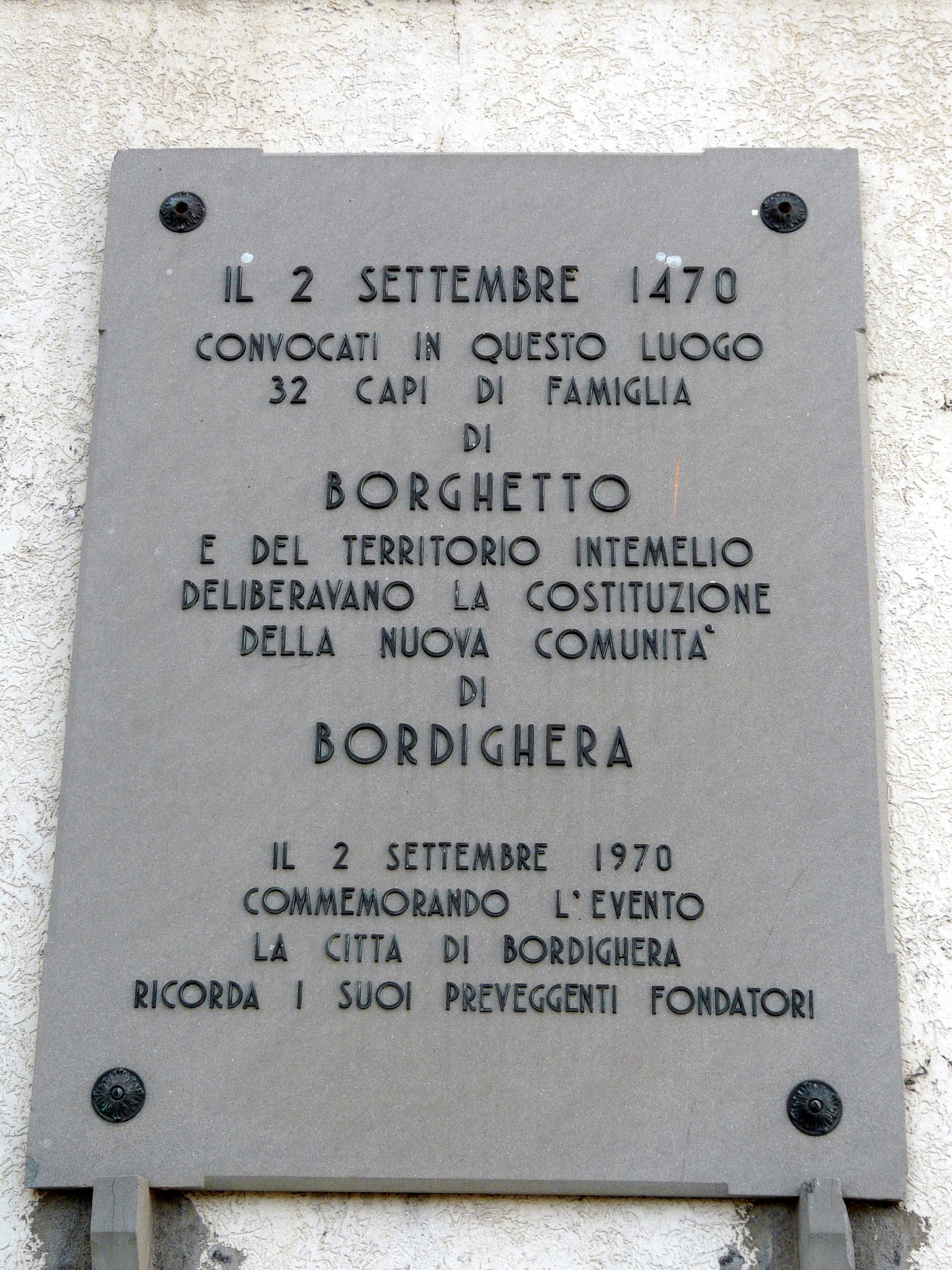
Memorial tablet for the 500th anniversary of Bordighera foundation

Borghetto San Nicolò is a quite ancient village and it probably was founded by Ligurian tribes devoted to hunting and cattle breeding. After the centuries of instability and precariousness followed the fall of the Roman Empire Borghetto was assigned by the Carolingian Empire to the Comitato di Ventimiglia ("County of Ventimiglia"), which held the village up to the 13th century. On 2 September 1470 in the church of Borghetto was held the assembly of the head of households which established the new city of Bordighera; many of them were living in Borghetto.

On 21 April 1686, the representants of eight villages, Camporosso, Vallebona, Vallecrosia, San Biagio della Cima, Sasso, Soldano, Borghetto San Nicolò and Bordighera, had a meeting in order to build what they called Magnifica Comunità degli Otto Luoghi, which can be translated as: "The magnificent community of the eight villages". Their goal was to gain independence from the nearby rival city of Ventimiglia.

Borghetto San Nicolò was a separate comune (municipality) until 1928 when, with Sasso (which also was an autonomous municipality) was joined with Bordighera.

=== Etymology ===
Borghetto means small village and is an early medieval term; San Nicolò is related to the saint of the village (Saint Nicholas) and was added to the name of the comune in 1861 following the Kingdom of Italy foundation, in order to identify it among other Italian comunes also named Borghetto.

== Bibliography ==
- Altavilla, Raffaele (1875). Il regno d'Italia: dizionario geografico - storico -statistico. Torino: A.F.Negro. p. 692.
