= Vallecrosia al Mare =

- Comune
- Comune di Vallecrosia al Mare
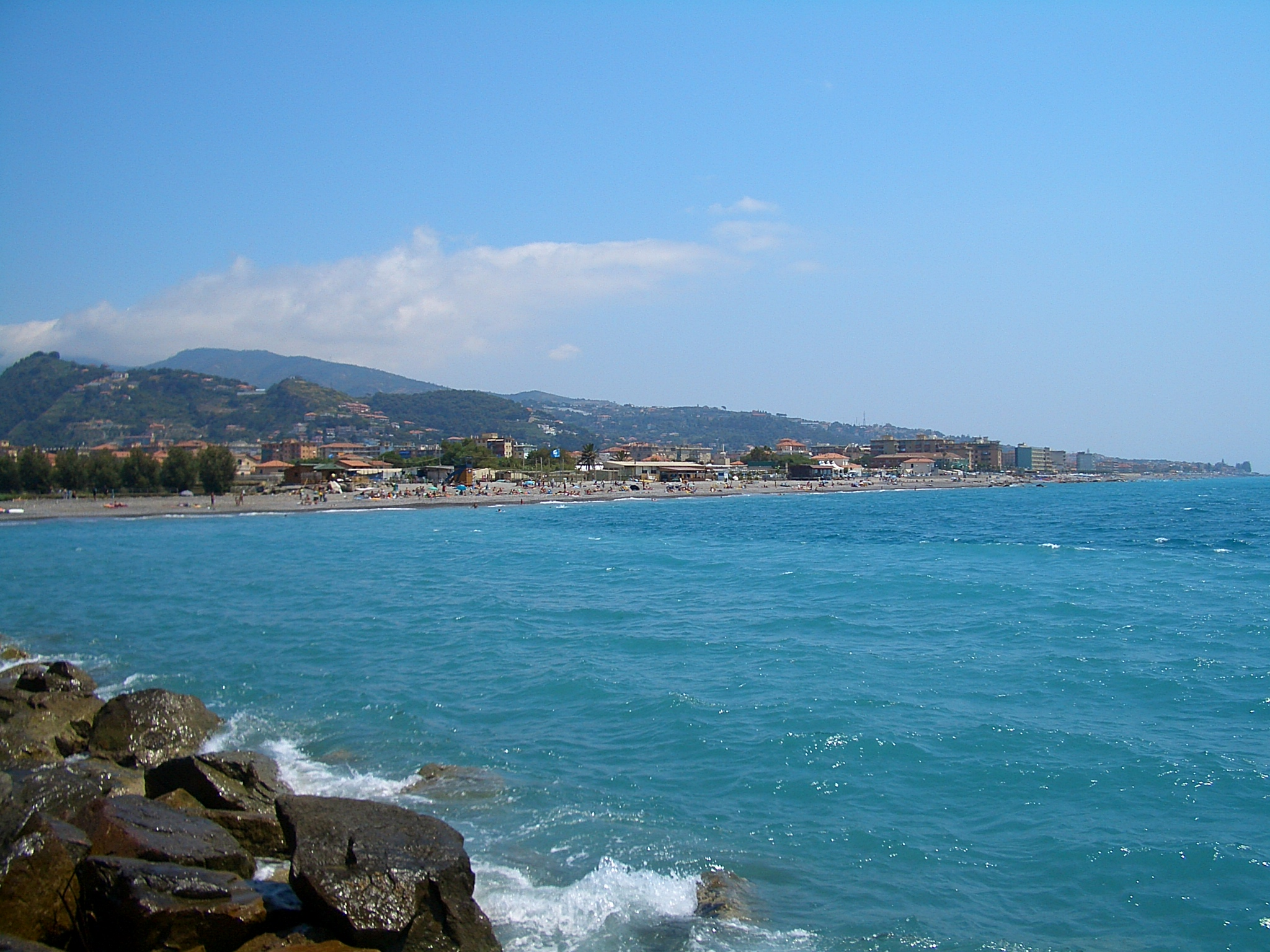
- Vallecrosia al Mare's coastline seen from Camporosso Beach

- Coat of arms

- Location within Italy Location within Liguria
- Coordinates: 43°49′N 7°39′E
- Country: Italy
- Region: Liguria
- Province: Imperia (IM)

Area
  - Total: 3.6 km^{2} (1.4 sq mi)
- Elevation: 5 m (16 ft)

Population (28 February 2017)
  - Total: 6,957
  - Density: 1,900/km^{2} (5,000/sq mi)
- Demonym: Vallecrosini
- Time zone: UTC+1 (CET)
  - Summer (DST): UTC+2 (CEST)
- Postal code: 18019
- Dialing code: 0184
- Website: Official website

Vallecrosia al Mare (Ligurian: Vallecrösia or Vallecrösa), formerly Vallecrosia, is a comune (municipality) in the Province of Imperia in the Italian region Liguria, located about 120 kilometres (75 mi) southwest of Genoa and about 30 kilometres (19 mi) west of Imperia. It is next to the busy city of Ventimiglia.

Vallecrosia al Mare borders the following municipalities: Bordighera, Camporosso, San Biagio della Cima, and Vallebona.

== History ==
On 21 April 1686, the representants of eight villages, Camporosso, Vallebona, Vallecrosia, San Biagio della Cima, Sasso, Soldano, Borghetto San Nicolò and Bordighera had a meeting in order to build what they called "Magnifica Comunità degli Otto Luoghi", which can be translated as: "The magnificent community of the eight villages". Their goal was to gain independence from the nearby rival city of Ventimiglia.

In 2026, following a referendum, the town's name changed from Vallecrosia to Vallecrosia al Mare.
