= San Biagio della Cima =

- Comune
- Comune di San Biagio della Cima
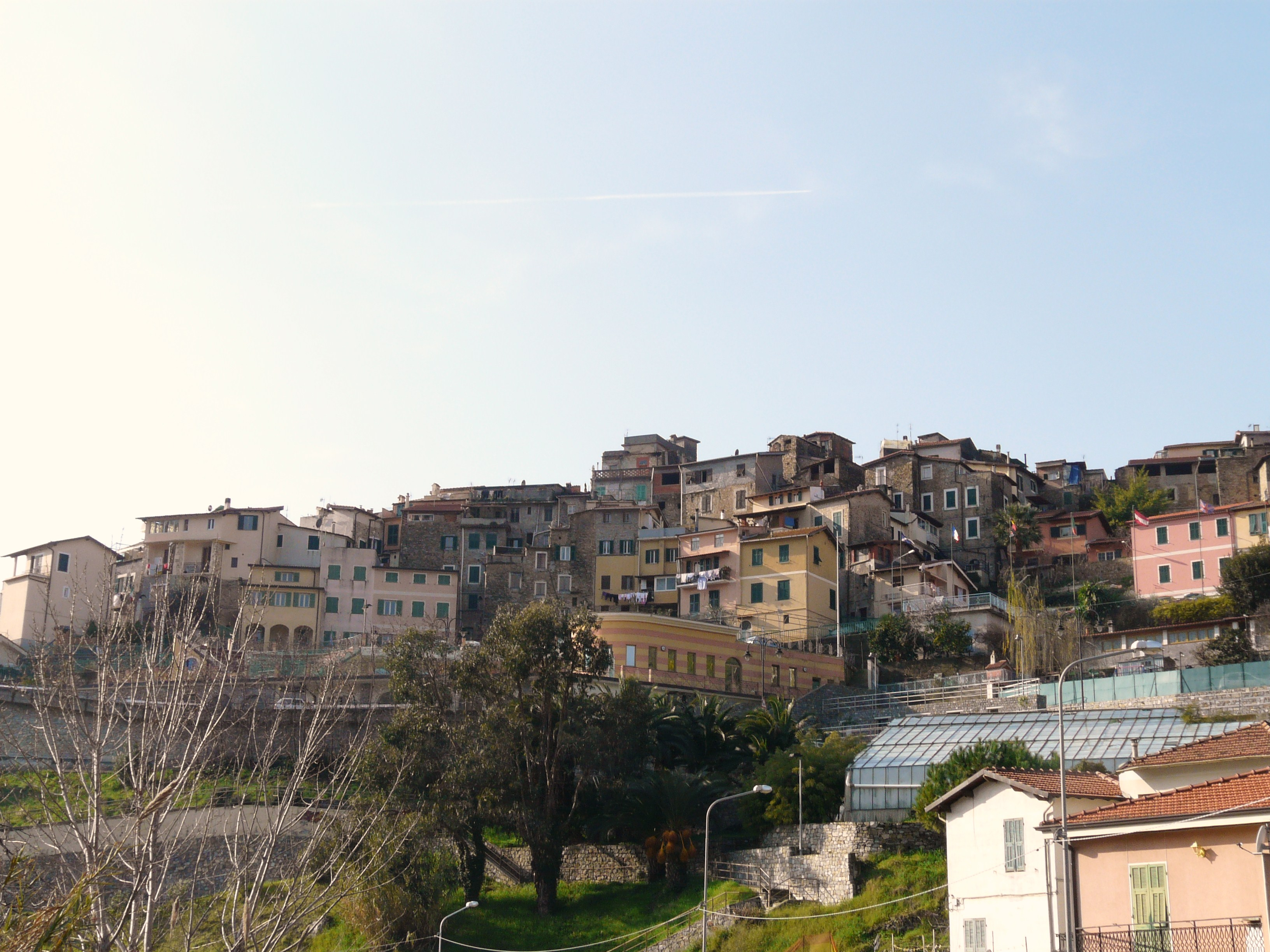
- View of San Biagio della Cima

- Coat of arms

- Location within Italy Location within Liguria
- Coordinates: 43°49′N 7°39′E
- Country: Italy
- Region: Liguria
- Province: Imperia (IM)

Government
  - Mayor: Luciano Biancheri

Area
  - Total: 4.6 km^{2} (1.8 sq mi)
- Elevation: 100 m (330 ft)

Population (31 December 2015)
  - Total: 1,329
  - Density: 290/km^{2} (750/sq mi)
- Demonym: Sanbiagini
- Time zone: UTC+1 (CET)
  - Summer (DST): UTC+2 (CEST)
- Postal code: 18030
- Dialing code: 0184
- Website: Official website

San Biagio della Cima (Ligurian: San Giaixu) is a comune (municipality) in the Province of Imperia in the Italian region Liguria, located about 120 kilometres (75 mi) southwest of Genoa and about 30 kilometres (19 mi) west of Imperia.

San Biagio della Cima borders the following municipalities: Camporosso, Dolceacqua, Perinaldo, Soldano, Vallebona, and Vallecrosia.

== History ==
On 21 April 1686, the representants of eight villages, Camporosso, Vallebona, Vallecrosia, San Biagio della Cima, Sasso, Soldano, Borghetto San Nicolò and Bordighera had a meeting in order to build what they called "Magnifica Comunità degli Otto Luoghi", which can be translated as: "The magnificent community of the eight villages". Their goal was to gain independence from the nearby rival city of Ventimiglia.

== Twin towns ==
San Biagio della Cima is twinned with:

- Camps-la-Source, France (2005)
