= Principality of Seborga =

Unrecognised micronation in northwest Italy

Principality of Seborga Principato di Seborga (Italian) Prinçipatu de A Seborca (Ligurian)
- Micronation (unrecognized entity)
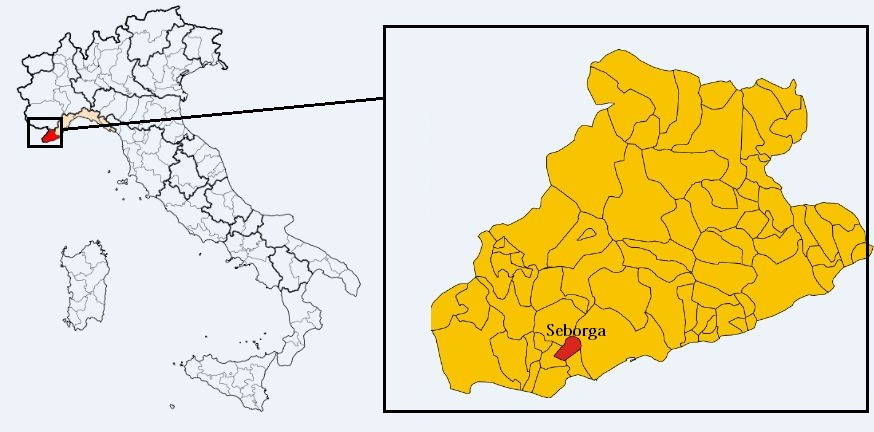
- Map the Italian Comune of Seborga and the Principality of Seborga marked in red within Italy
- Location: 43°50′N 7°42′E
- Area claimed: 14 km^{2} (5.4 sq mi)
- Claimed by: Giorgio I (1963–2009); Marcello I (2010–2019); Nina (2019–present)
- Dates claimed: 1963–present
- Website www.principatodiseborga.com

The Principality of Seborga (Italian: Principato di Seborga, Ligurian: Prinçipâtu de Seburga) is a micronation that claims a 14 km^{2} (5.4 mi^{2}; 3,500-acre) area located in the northwestern Italian Province of Imperia in Liguria, near the French border, and about 35 kilometres (20 mi) from Monaco. The principality is coextensive with the comune of Seborga; assertions of sovereignty were instigated in 1963 by a local campaigner based on unproven claims about territorial settlements made by the Congress of Vienna after the Napoleonic Wars.

== History ==
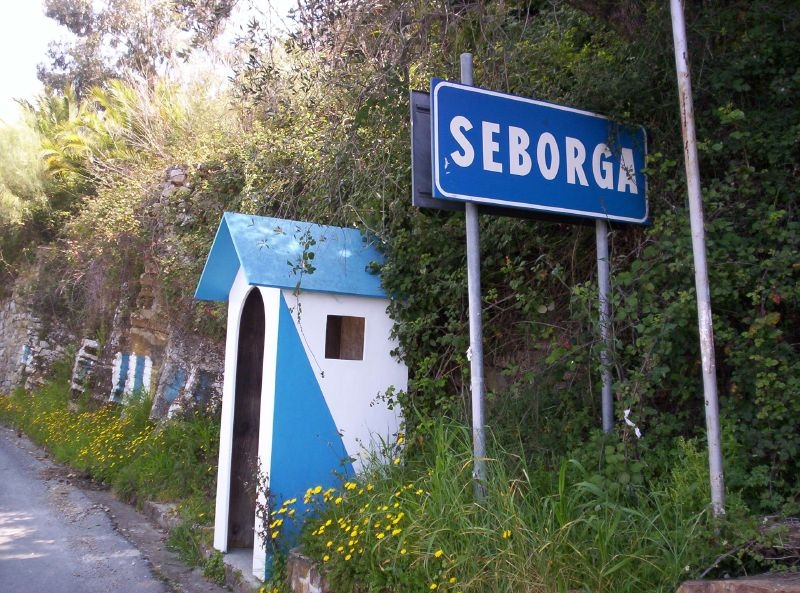
The "frontier" post on the road approaching Seborga

The claim of sovereignty for Seborga was put forward in 1963 by a Seborgan former flower grower named Giorgio Carbone. He claimed to have found documents from the Vatican archives which, according to Carbone, indicated that Seborga had never been a possession of the House of Savoy and was therefore not legitimately included in the Kingdom of Italy when it was formed in 1861 during Italian unification. Carbone claimed that Seborga had existed as a sovereign state of Italy since 954, and that from 1079 it was a principality of the Holy Roman Empire. Sovereignty claims assert that Seborga was overlooked by the Congress of Vienna in its redistribution of European territories after the Napoleonic Wars.

Carbone promoted the idea of Seborgan independence as a principality, and in 1963 the town's inhabitants elected him as their putative head of state. Carbone assumed the style and title His Tremendousness (Sua Tremendità) Giorgio I, Prince of Seborga. He formed a "cabinet" of ministers; minted a local currency, the luigino; introduced a Seborgan flag, a white cross on a blue background; and established a Latin motto, Sub Umbra Sede (Sit in the shade). Carbone's campaign has generally not been taken seriously and is widely viewed as a ruse to attract tourists to the town, although his supporters in the town claim that their small state has been recognised by Burkina Faso.

In January 2006, Carbone announced that he would abdicate on reaching the age of 70, apparently as a result of a row over rebuilding the village centre, but he did not and continued to hold the office until his death. Even so, this decision was the subject of a feature on the BBC World Service radio programme World Today on 25 January 2006.

Giorgio Carbone retained his ceremonial position until his death on 25 November 2009 (age 73), due to complications due to amyotrophic lateral sclerosis. The position of the Serborgan "monarch" is not hereditary, and since Carbone's death, elections have been held in Seborga every seven years among the town's 200 registered voters. Carbone was succeeded by businessman Marcello Menegatto, who was elected on 25 April 2010 and crowned on 22 May 2010 as His Serene Highness (Sua Altezza Serenissima or SAS) Prince Marcello I. Menegatto was re-elected as Prince on 23 April 2017, after an unsuccessful challenge to the position by Mark Dezzani, a British-born radio DJ who had lived in Seborga for nearly 40 years.

On 12 April 2019, Menegatto abdicated from his position, and he was succeeded by his ex-wife, Nina Menegatto, who was elected by the town as Her Serene Highness Princess Nina on 10 November 2019 and confirmed for another 7-year term on 23 October 2026.

== List of Seborgan monarchs ==
Title	Given name	Reign began	Reign ended
Prince Giorgio I	Giorgio Carbone	14 May 1963	25 November 2009
Prince Marcello I	Marcello Menegatto	25 April 2010	10 November 2019
Princess Nina	Nina Menegatto	10 November 2019	

There have been two additional claimants to the Seborgan throne. Yasmine von Hohenstaufen Anjou Plantagenet claimed to be a descendant of 13th century Holy Roman Emperor Frederick II, and offered to return the principality to Italy in June 2006. In 2016, French writer Nicolas Mutte challenged Marcello, accusing him of placing tourism ahead of the city's traditions.

== Seborga today ==
Seborga's independence claims continue today, and an official Principato di Seborga website asserts the historical arguments put forward by Carbone. Seborga claims to maintain a volunteer border guard, the Corpo delle Guardie. Participants wear a blue-and-white uniform and during the tourist season they stand guard at sentry boxes on the unofficial border crossing on the main road into Seborga.

The unrecognised micronation that claims Seborga Town understands that the town still falls directly within the laws and borders of Italy.

=== State Symbols ===
==== Flag ====
Flag of the Principality of Seborga

The flag of Seborga consists of 9 blue horizontal stripes consisting of the right two thirds of the flag, symbolising the first 9 Templar Knights, of whom would have been called in Seborga, according to legend. The left part of the flag consists of a royal crown, above a blue Samnite shield with a Greek cross emblazoned on it (both from the coat of arms).

==== Coat of arms ====
Coat of arms of the Principality of Seborga

The coat of arms of Seborga seems to be from the House of Savoy (about 1760), since it presents a royal crown which appears to be very similar to its own. They both have a white cross, however the shield is light blue in contrast to Savoy's red, perhaps representing that Seborga is in a seafaring area, or because the village that was bought by Savoy from the monks, lived on the Lérins Islands. Coming out of the crown is a royal mantle, going behind everything else within the coat of arms.

The ribbon with Seborga's motto ("Sub Umbra Sedi") is said to originate from the 19th century, instead of ~1760 as the rest of the coat of arms is. It is at the bottom of the coat of arms.

==== Motto ====
Sub Umbra Sedi ("I sat in the shade") is the official motto of Seborga. It appears in the Statutes of Regulations which were made for Seborga in 1261, and it seems to derive from a sentence said by Prince-Abbot Aicardo in the time that he visited Seborga. Specifically, when he said that, during his walk along the steep and sunny paths that led to the village, he had found refreshment under some olive and chestnut trees that surrounded it.

=== Currency ===
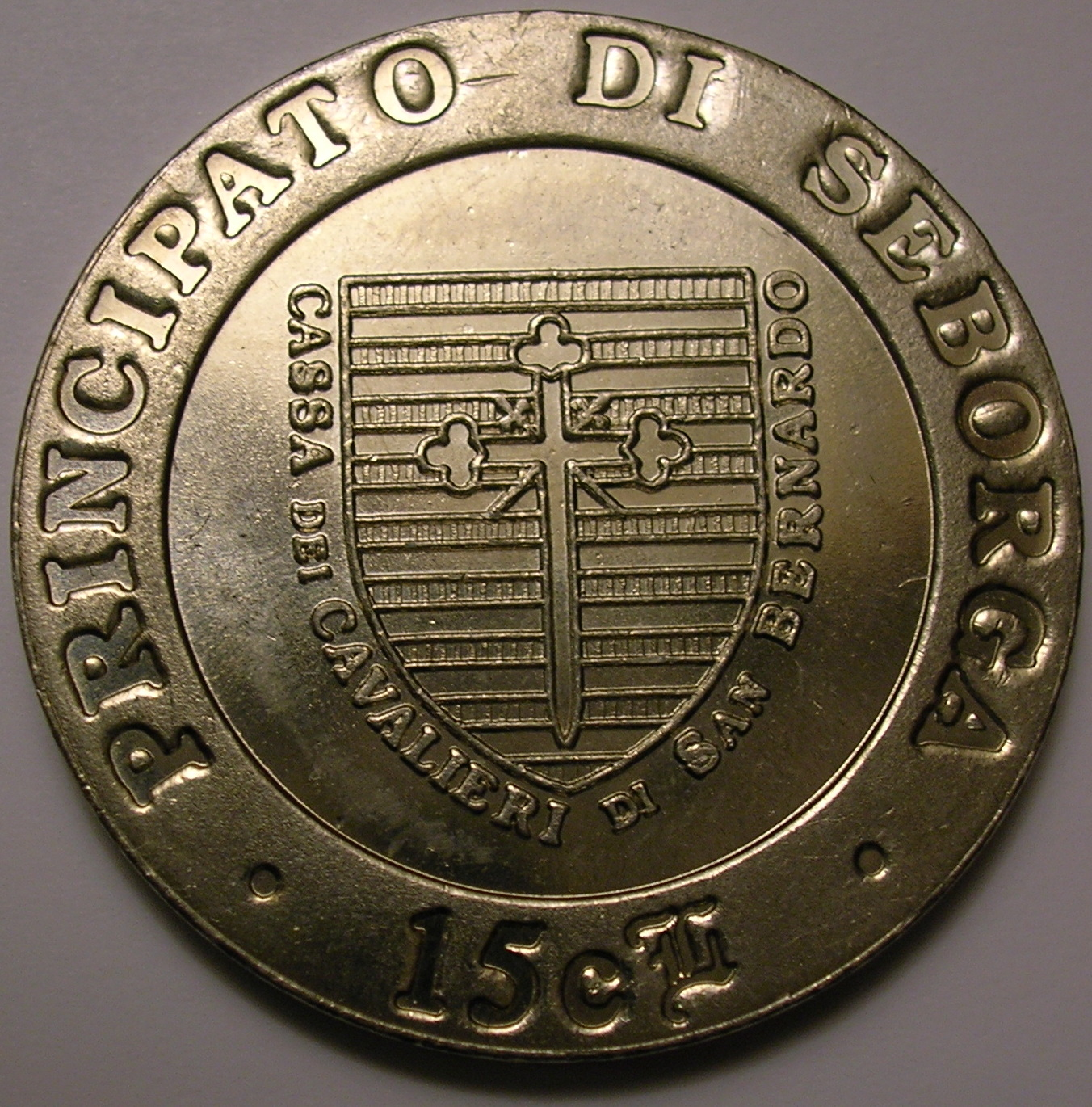
A 15 centesimi Seborga luigino coin

Seborga's local currency, the Seborga luigino, is divided into 100 centesimi. Luigini coins circulate in Seborga alongside the euro. The currency has no value outside of the town. The value of the luigino is pegged to the US dollar at SPL 1 = USD 6.00. On 20 August 2023, the Principality presented the first banknote ever of the luigini.

=== Demographics ===
As of 2025, Seborga has a population of 283 people, of which 48.4% are males and 51.6% are females. With 35% of the population aged over 65, it would be the second-oldest country in the world only besides Monaco.

== Bibliography ==
- Caïs de Pierlas, Eugène (1884). I Conti di Ventimiglia, il priorato di San Michele ed il principato di Seborga. Turin: G. B. Paravia.
