= Camporosso =

- Comune
- Città di Camporosso
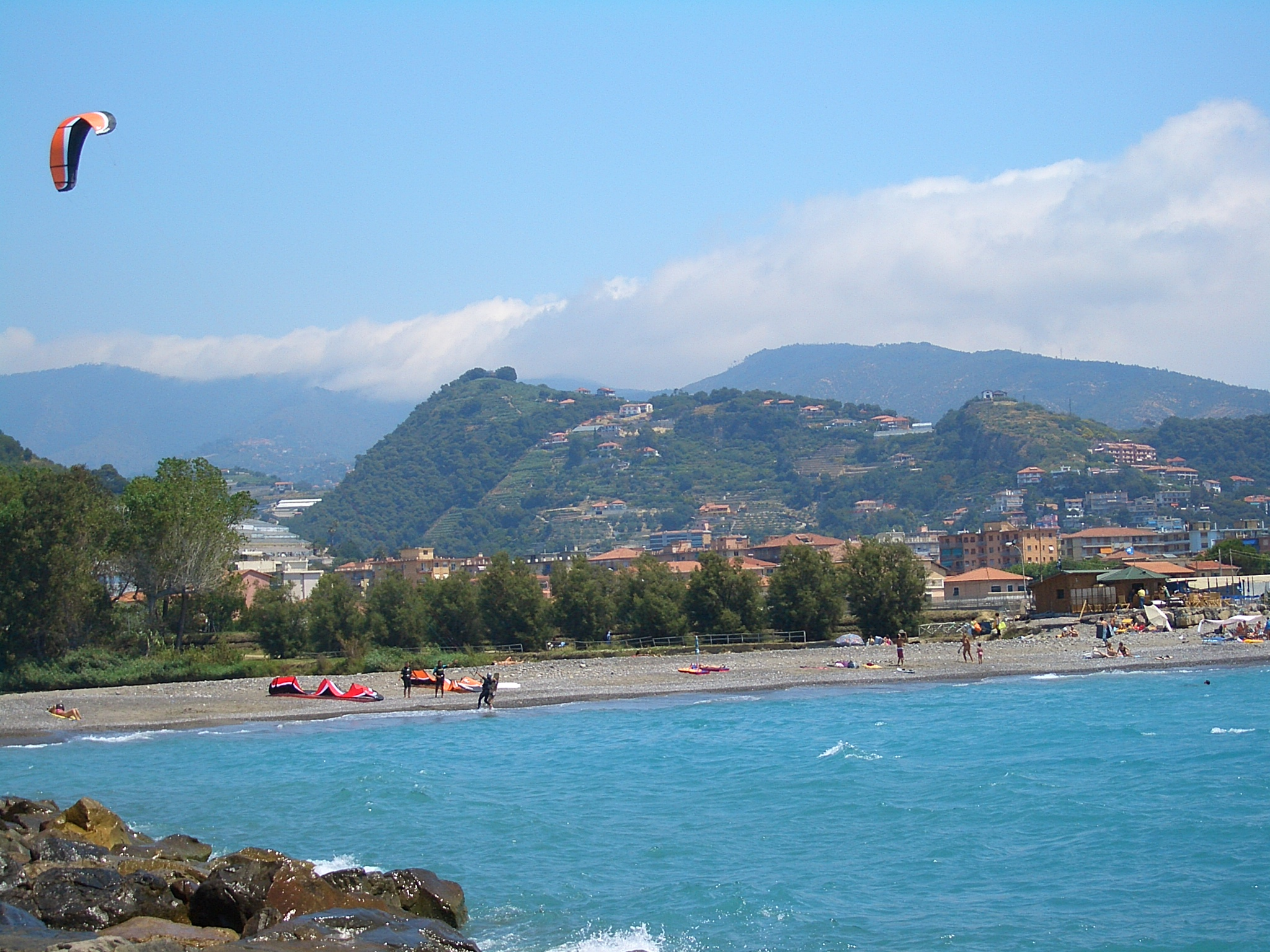
- Camporosso beach

- Flag Coat of arms

- Location within Italy Location within Liguria
- Coordinates: 43°49′N 7°38′E
- Country: Italy
- Region: Liguria
- Province: Imperia (IM)
- Frazioni: Balloi, Brunetti, Ciaixe, Magauda, San Giacomo, Trinità

Government
  - Mayor: Davide Gibelli

Area
  - Total: 17.6 km^{2} (6.8 sq mi)
- Elevation: 25 m (82 ft)

Population (28 February 2017)
  - Total: 5,602
  - Density: 318/km^{2} (824/sq mi)
- Demonym: Comporossini
- Time zone: UTC+1 (CET)
  - Summer (DST): UTC+2 (CEST)
- Postal code: 18033
- Dialing code: +39 0184
- Patron saint: St. Sebastian
- Saint day: 20 January
- Website: Official website

Camporosso (Ligurian: Campurussu) is a comune (municipality) in the Province of Imperia in the Italian region Liguria, located about 160 kilometres (99 mi) southwest of Genoa and about 45 kilometres (28 mi) west of Imperia.

Camporosso borders the following municipalities: Dolceacqua, San Biagio della Cima, Vallecrosia, and Ventimiglia.

== History ==
On 21 April 1686, the representants of eight villages, Camporosso, Vallebona, Vallecrosia, San Biagio della Cima, Sasso, Soldano, Borghetto San Nicolò and Bordighera had a meeting in order to build what they called "Magnifica Comunità degli Otto Luoghi", which can be translated as: "The magnificent community of the eight villages". Their goal was to gain independence from the nearby rival city of Ventimiglia.
