= Seborga =

Village in Liguria, Italy

Seborga A Seborca/A Seburca
- Comune
- Comune di Seborga
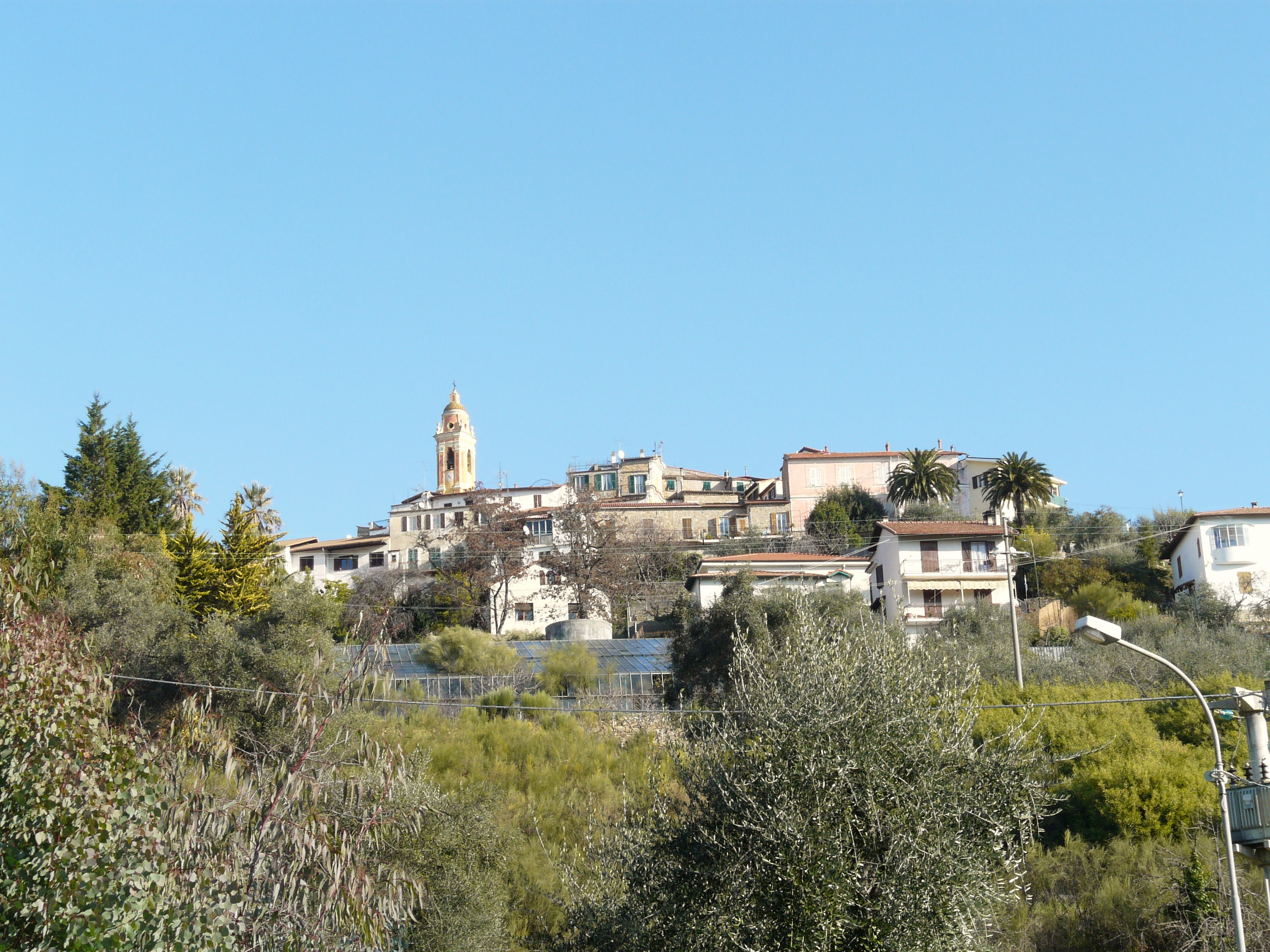
- View of Seborga

- Flag Coat of arms

- Location within Italy Location within Liguria
- Coordinates: 43°49′34″N 7°41′40″E
- Country: Italy
- Region: Liguria
- Province: Imperia (IM)

Government
  - Mayor: Enrico Ilariuzzi

Area
  - Total: 4.87 km^{2} (1.88 sq mi)
- Elevation: 500 m (1,600 ft)

Population (2025)
  - Total: 283
  - Density: 58.1/km^{2} (151/sq mi)
- Demonym: Seborghini
- Time zone: UTC+1 (CET)
  - Summer (DST): UTC+2 (CEST)
- Postal code: 18012
- Dialing code: 0184
- ISTAT code: 008057
- Patron saint: San Bernardo
- Saint day: 20 August
- Website: Official website

Seborga (Ligurian: A Seborca/A Seburca) is a small village in the Italian region of Liguria near the French border. Administratively, it is a comune of the Italian province of Imperia, but since 1963 it has also been claimed as the Principality of Seborga, an unrecognized micronation. The main economic activities are horticulture and tourism. The population is 283 as of 2025. It is on the register of I Borghi più belli d'Italia ("The most beautiful villages of Italy").

== Demographics ==
Historical population

Year	Pop.	±%
1861	358	—
1871	367	+2.5%
1881	339	−7.6%
1901	295	−13.0%
1911	304	+3.1%
1921	328	+7.9%
1931	198	−39.6%
1936	203	+2.5%

Year	Pop.	±%
1951	222	+9.4%
1961	247	+11.3%
1971	277	+12.1%
1981	267	−3.6%
1991	352	+31.8%
2001	340	−3.4%
2011	323	−5.0%
2021	281	−13.0%

Source: ISTAT

== Economy ==
Seborga is known in the region for its agricultural activity: in particular, cultivation and collection of olives and floriculture crops. Thanks to Seborga's publicity as a principality, tourism has expanded in recent years. The principality's historic town centre was also restored, ensuring that its charms were protected from commercial overdevelopment.

== Culture ==
An important cultural event in Seborga is the annual festival of Saint Bernard, the town's patron saint, held on 20 August. The festival includes a procession of citizens and the carrying of a statue of Bernard.

Seborga's twin city is L'Escarène, France.

== Transport ==
Seborga is situated along Provincial Road 57 in Imperia. The nearest motorway access is at the Bordighera exit on the A10. The nearest railway station is also the one in Bordighera, on the Ventimiglia-Genoa line.

== Principality of Seborga ==
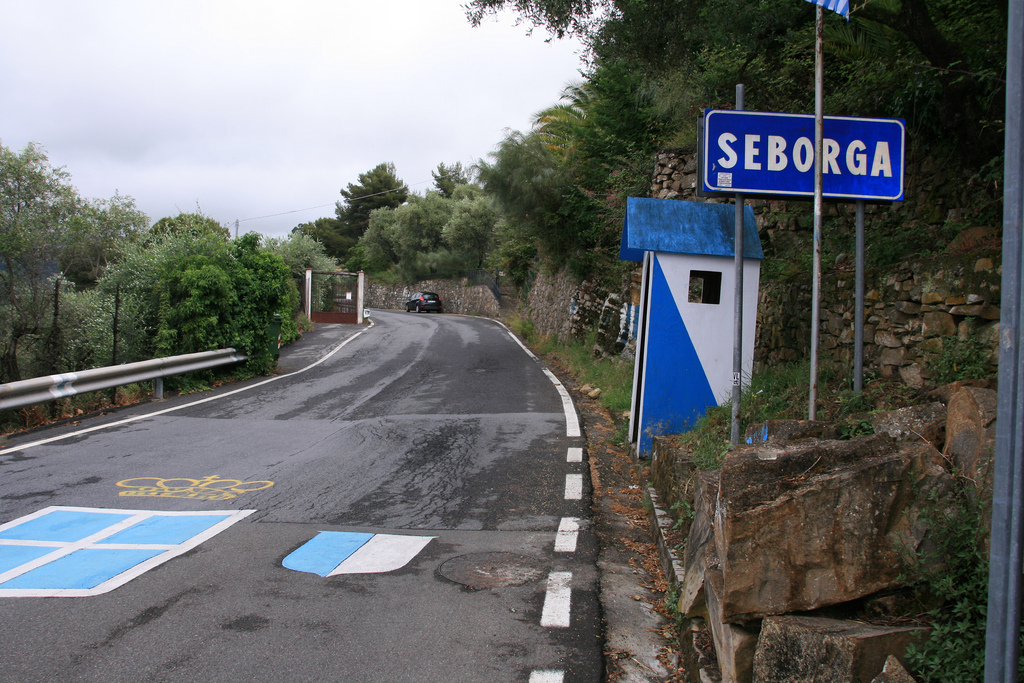
Sentry boxes on the road into Seborga assert the existence of a border with Italy

In 1963, Giorgio Carbone – then head of the local flower growers' co-operative – began promoting the idea that Seborga and its surrounding territory were de jure independent from Italy. Carbone claimed that Seborga had not been properly incorporated into the House of Savoy in the 18th century (as commonly believed) and consequently had not been included in the series of political reorganizations of the region leading to the modern Republic of Italy.

Carbone was promptly elected by the people of Seborga to be prince of the state. Following his death in 2009 two successors to the position have been elected. However, this purported government has not been recognised by either Italy or internationally. Supporters of the independence claim have promoted it with some of the trappings of a state, including the creation of a flag, the minting of coins, and the installation of sentry boxes on the main road into Seborga.
