= Confeugo =

Cultural event in Liguria, Italy

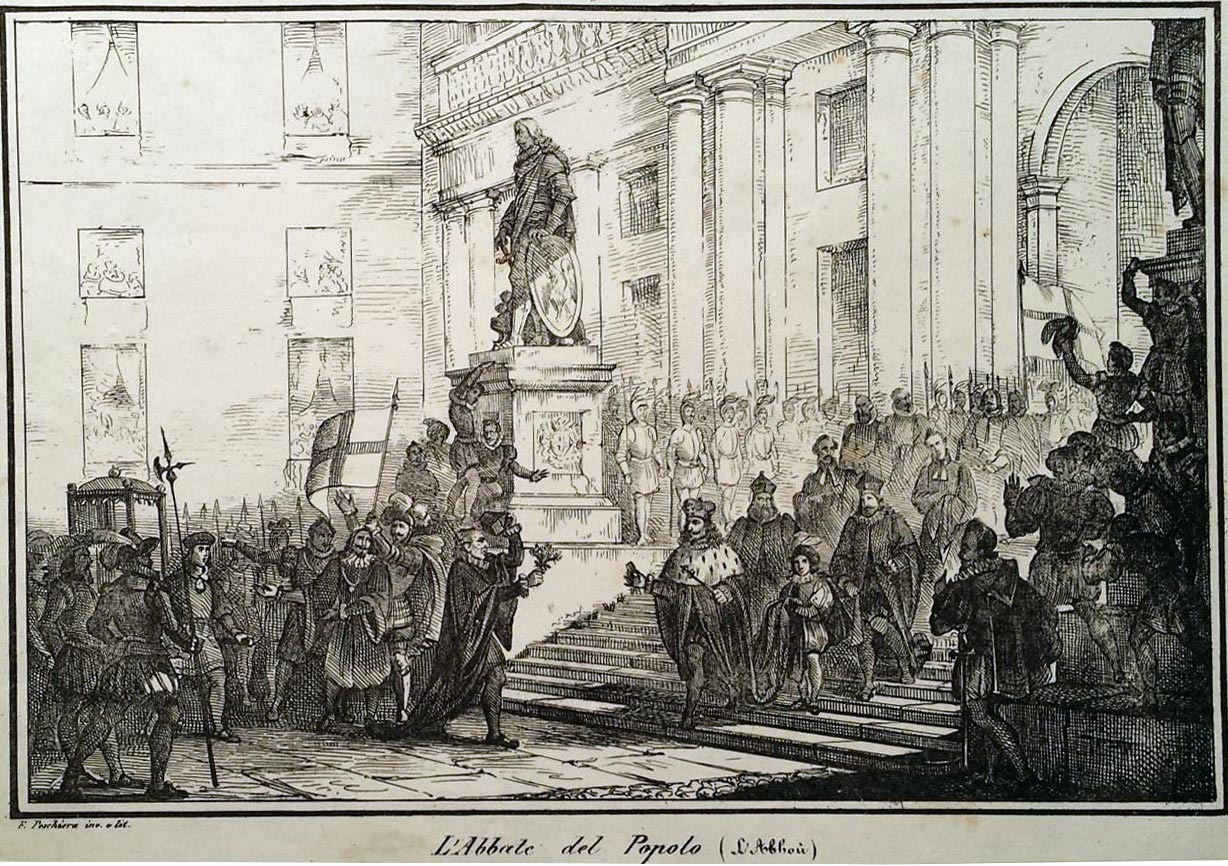
An engraving from the year 1834 showing the statue of the abbot in front of the Ducal Palace in Genoa

The Confeugo (IPA: /kuŋˈføːgu/ in Genoese, confuòco in Italian) is an ancient cultural event in Liguria, traditionally celebrated on Christmas Eve or a couple of days before Christmas. It is a historical event linked to the Republic of Genoa and is still commemorated today mainly in Genoa and Savona, but also in other Ligurian Municipalities that were once the seat of podesterie and capitaneati.

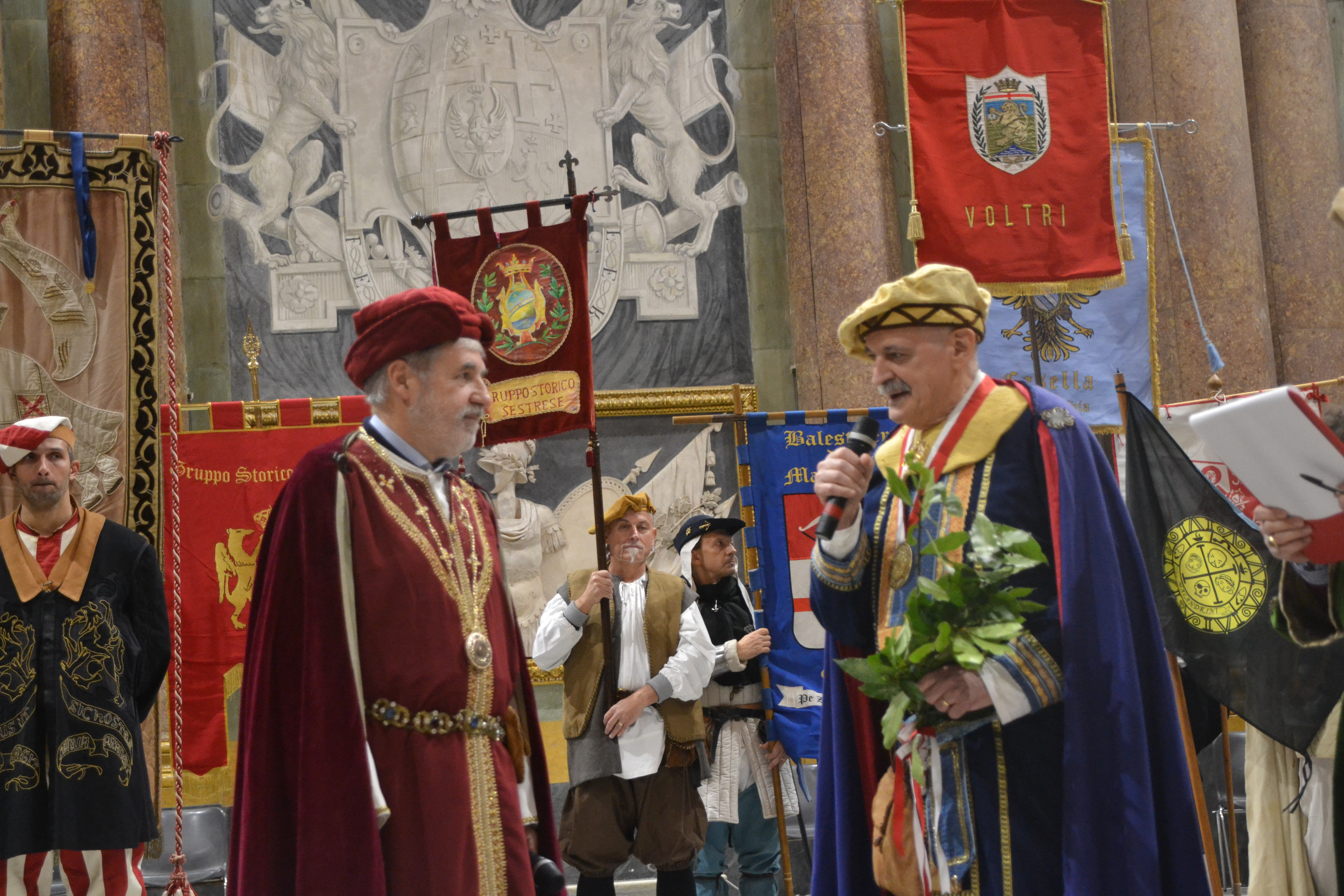
The duke meeting the abbot, Confeugo in Genoa, 2019

== History ==
As some historical sources testify, this tradition was born in Genoa in the early years of the fourteenth century, although most probably this historical event dates back to older times. Born to pay homage to the highest office of the Free Commune - the podestà - and later of the Republic of Genoa (the Captains of the People) and since 1339 to the doge himself - the popular ceremony consists of donating a large laurel trunk, the branches of which are adorned with red and white ribbons (the colours of the Genoa flag) to the public authority. The laurel branches are then burned, and the name of this event actually derives from the Genoese/Italian word for bonfire. The bonfire was followed by the abbot reporting various city problems to the doge on a public square. In Genoa today, the role of the abbot of the people is played by the president of the historical Genoese association A Compagna and the doge is played by the mayor.

Historical commemoration has it that it is the abbot of the people - for Genoa the representative of the three Podestas of Bisagno, Polcevera and Voltri - and the governor/representative of a city or town who should officiate this event.

The Confeugo was celebrated annually until 1499 when it was abolished during the French domination of King Louis XII; restored in 1530, it was again suppressed by the Senate of the Republic of Genoa on December 30, 1637 because, according to the text of the Senate, it caused great confusion and serious expense to the population of the Bisagno valley.

However, the ceremony - later celebrated with minor tones and in a more private form - was performed until December 24, 1796 when the last abbot of San Martino di Struppa, Antonio Bazzorao, gave his gifts and good wishes to doge Giacomo Maria Brignole for the beginning of the year. Historically, it was the last homage to the highest republican office because on 22 May 1797 the new French domination of Napoleon Bonaparte decreed the suppression of the Republic of Genoa and, consequently, the end of the popular manifestation.

Even during the coronavirus pandemic was the Confeugo celebrated in December 2020, although no historical bands and costumes paraded through the streets of downtown Genoa as the few authorities present at the ducal palace had to wear a mask.

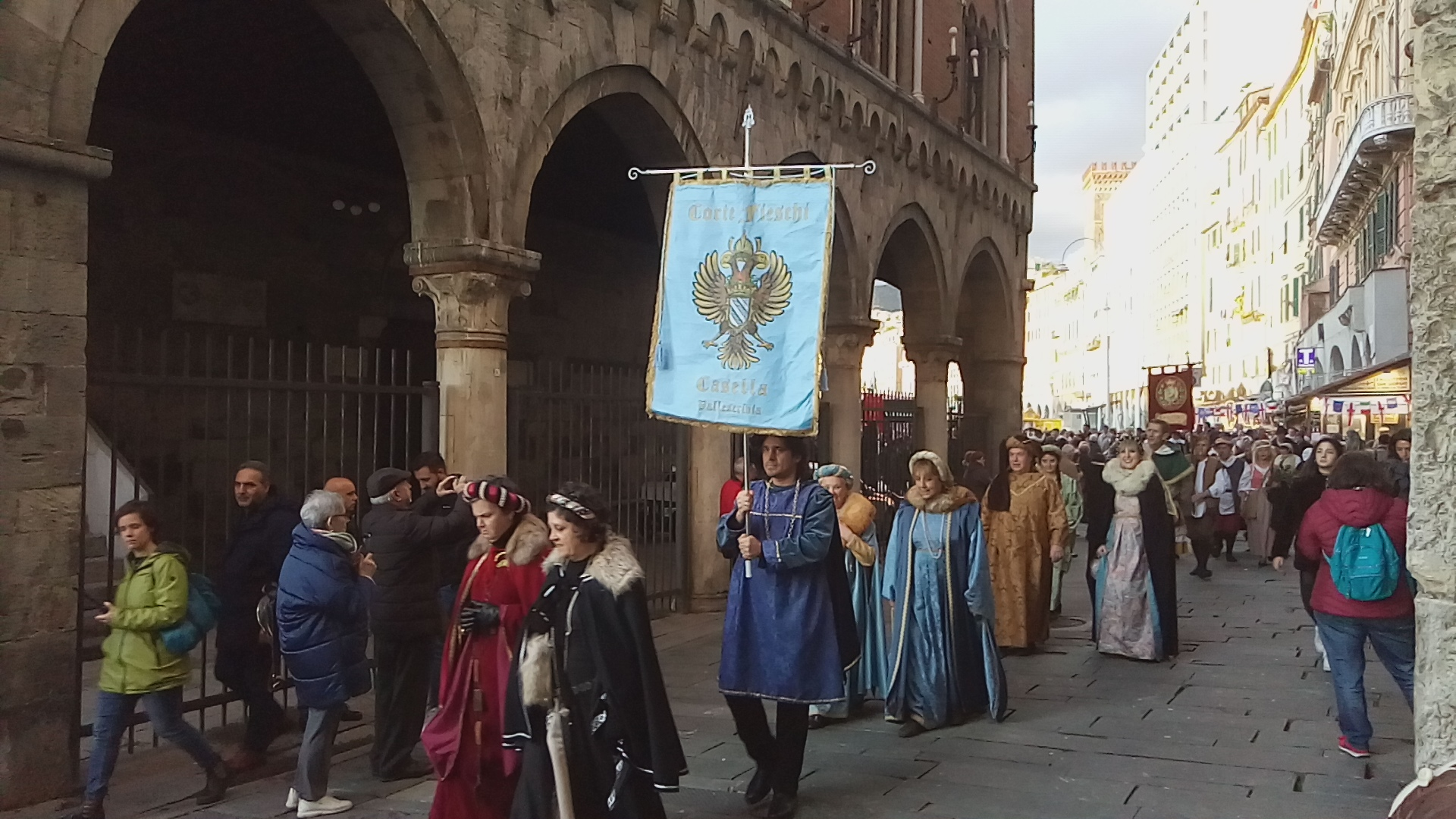
A Confeugo parade in downtown Genoa bound for Piazza de Ferrari

== The ceremony ==
From the very beginning, the event in Genoa has included the exchange of greetings between the abbot of the people and the doge at the Ducal Palace and the lighting of the laurel trunk and branches in the courtyard, being the name confeugo a clear derivation from the bonfire as the centerpiece of the historical ceremony. The abbot would meet with the Doge by saying the following greeting words in the old Genoese language: Ben trovòu, Messê ro Dûxe (Translated into English: Welcome, Mr. Doge). The Doge would then reply by saying: Ben vegnûo, Messê l'Abbòu (Welcome, honorable Abbot).

After the exchange of gifts, namely a bunch of artificial flowers for the Doge and a one hundred Lire card from the Banco di San Giorgio for the religious authority, the abbot listed the problems voiced by the people, which the Doge was to remedy in the following year. The laurel stump was lit on the night of Christmas Eve by the doge before personalities from the municipal council and the archbishop of Genoa; the ceremony ended with the extinguishing of the bonfire by throwing wine, sugar and almond candy on it and with a free banquet at the ducal palace.

In the ceremony of December 22, 2007 a historical change took place in the Confeugo of the City of Genoa because, for the first time in the history of this popular event, the classical greeting formula of the fifteenth century had to be changed: in the traditional greeting the abbot addressed Genoa's mayor Marta Vincenzi - the first woman to become the first citizen of the Ligurian capital - with the wording Madamma Dûxe (Mrs. Doge) instead of the usual wording Messê ro Dûxe.

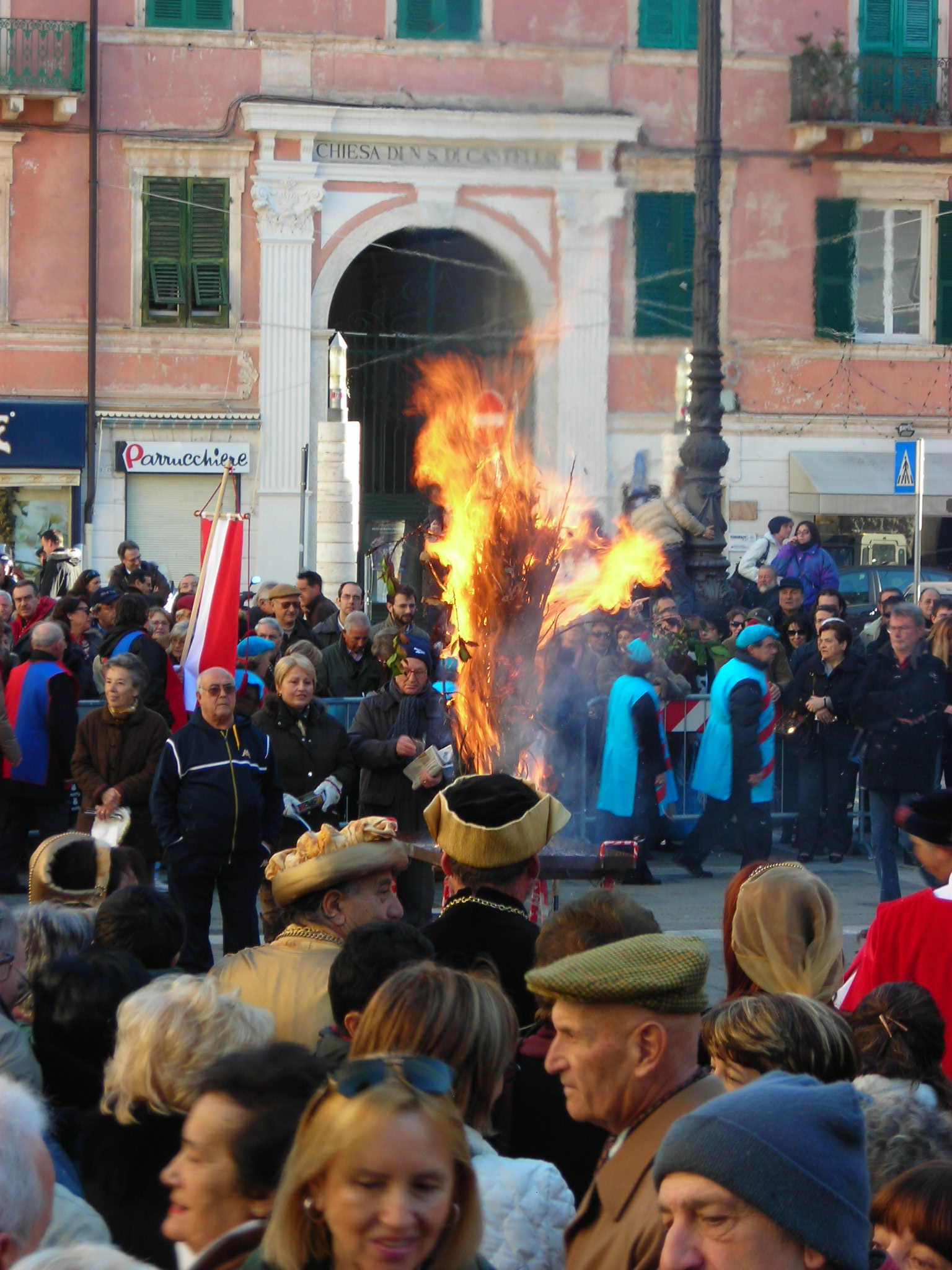
The ceremony in Savona, Liguria

== The Confeugo today ==
After 127 years, Genoa's association A Compagna decided to restore this important ceremony in 1923. Inspired by the ancient Confeugo, on 24 December 1923 a laurel plant adorned in red and white was solemnly delivered to the city mayor, senator Federico Ricci. The last ceremony before World War II took place in December 1937. The ceremony was resumed in 1951 and has been held since 1998 in the "Paxo", that is in the historical seat of the Ducal Palace where the tradition was born in the Middle Ages. In addition to the offering of the laurel the "tondo de Natale", a ceramic plate decorated by hand in the Ligurian artistic tradition, was added in 1974.

Today, this feast is renewed in several towns and villages of Liguria with the same official rite - the laurel branch bonfire - but celebrated in different ways depending on the municipality that stages it. In the west of Liguria it is celebrated in Albenga (in the hamlet of Lusignano), Imperia, Pietra Ligure, Noli, Savona, Varazze, Arenzano and Genoa; in the east it takes place in the municipalities of Uscio, Recco, Santa Margherita Ligure, Rapallo, Chiavari, Lavagna and Sestri Levante (in the hamlet of Riva Trigoso).
