= Riviera Airport =

Albenga - Riviera Airport
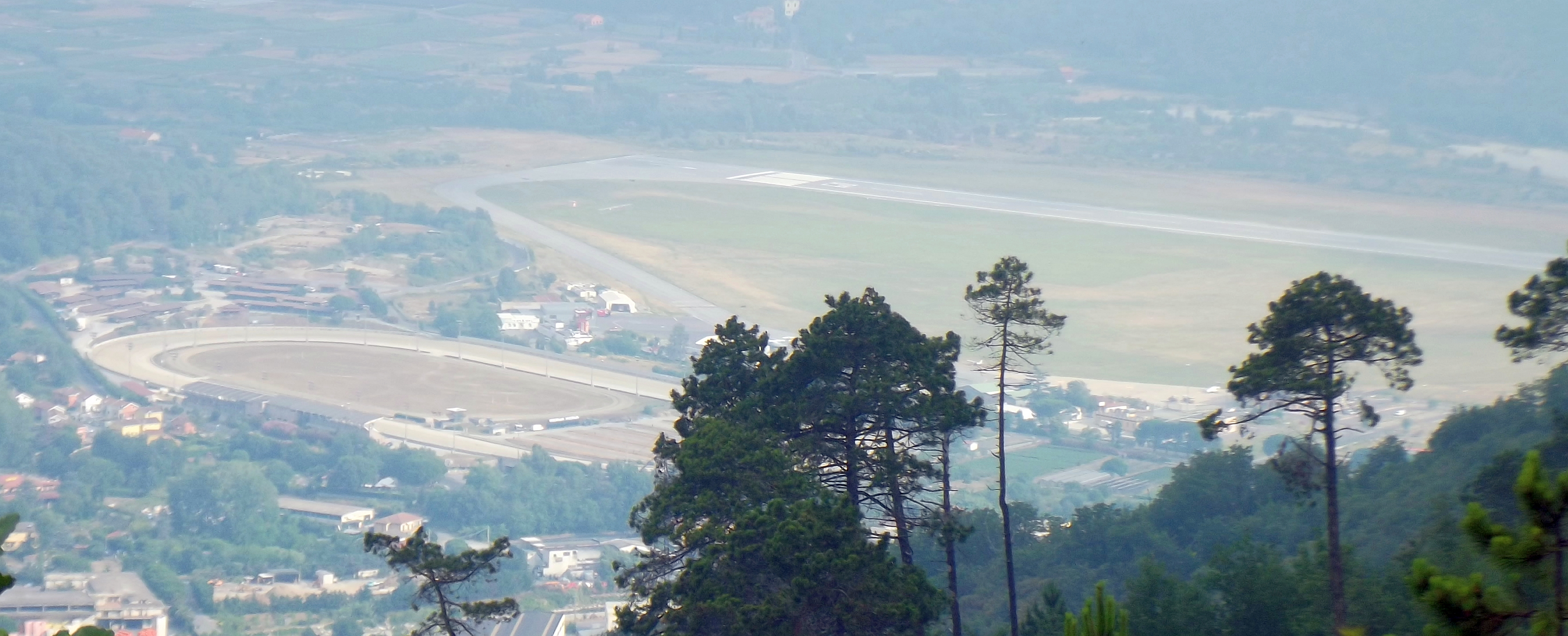
- IATA: ALL; ICAO: LIMG

Summary
- Airport type: Public
- Operator: Riviera Airport
- Serves: Albenga, Italy
- Elevation AMSL: 149 ft / 45.4 m
- Coordinates: 44°02′45″N 008°07′32″E
- Website: www.riviera-airport.it/home/

Map
- Location of airport in Italy

Runways
Direction	Length		Surface
Direction	m	ft	Surface
09/27	1,429	4,688	Asphalt

Albenga - Riviera Airport (IATA: ALL, ICAO: LIMG), former known as Villanova d'Albenga Airport, is in northwest Italy, in the region of Liguria. It is on the Italian Riviera between Savona and Imperia, approximately 7 kilometres (4.3 mi) west of the town of Albenga, in the community of Villanova d’Albenga.

== Operations ==
Riviera Airport is mainly used for general aviation in the Northern Mediterranean, with international travel and transport facilitated by the presence of Italian Customs. The airport is also used by the Italian aeroplane manufacturer Piaggio Aerospace. The runway, measuring about 1,500 metres (4,900 ft) in length, can be used by aircraft up to 60 tonnes (59 long tons; 66 short tons) of maximum take-off weight. Riviera Airport is well connected to all financial and tourist centres on the Italian and French Riviera by means of highway A10 and the Via Aurelia (SS1). While Monte-Carlo is less than an hour's travel by car, a helicopter company based at the airport can connect passengers from the runway directly to the Principality of Monaco in less than 20 minutes.

== History ==
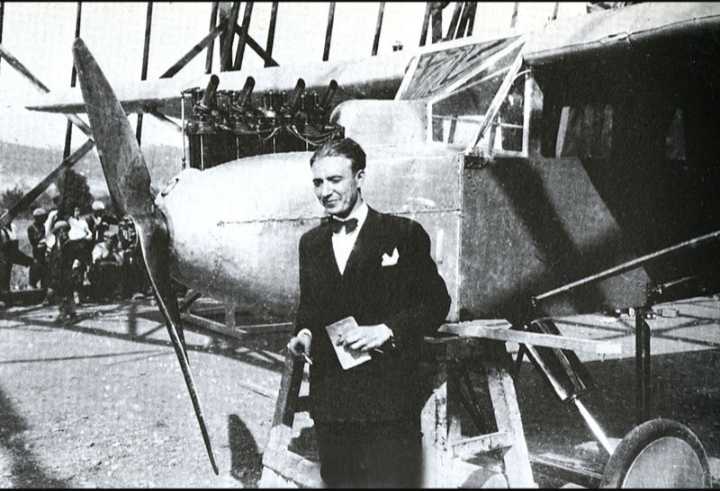
Giuseppe Gabrielli at Riviera Airport (1932)

In 1922, an airfield with a 900 m (3,000 ft) grass runway was opened in Villanova d'Albenga. Seven years later, in 1929, aircraft manufacturer Piaggio established a factory on the site. In 1937, the grass runway became the first tarmac runway in Italy, and in the following years hangars were also added. After being used by the military during World War II, all damage was repaired, and in 1946, scheduled flights to Rome began. Riviera Airport was the main airport for the region up until 1962 when the airport in Genoa opened. In 1968, all scheduled and charter flights were transferred from Riviera Airport to the airport of Genoa. Piaggio also moved the production to Genoa. For the next thirty years, Riviera Airport was used mainly for general aviation. In the summer of 1997, commercial flights to Corsica, Sardinia and Rome were offered, however this met with little economic success. In 2014, Piaggio Aerospace returned its operations from Genoa back to Riviera Airport and in 2015, the local communities decided to sell and privatize the airport. The new owner plans to modernize the airport and offer exclusive services for private and business jets operating in the region.
