= San Fedele, Albenga =

San Fedele
- Frazione
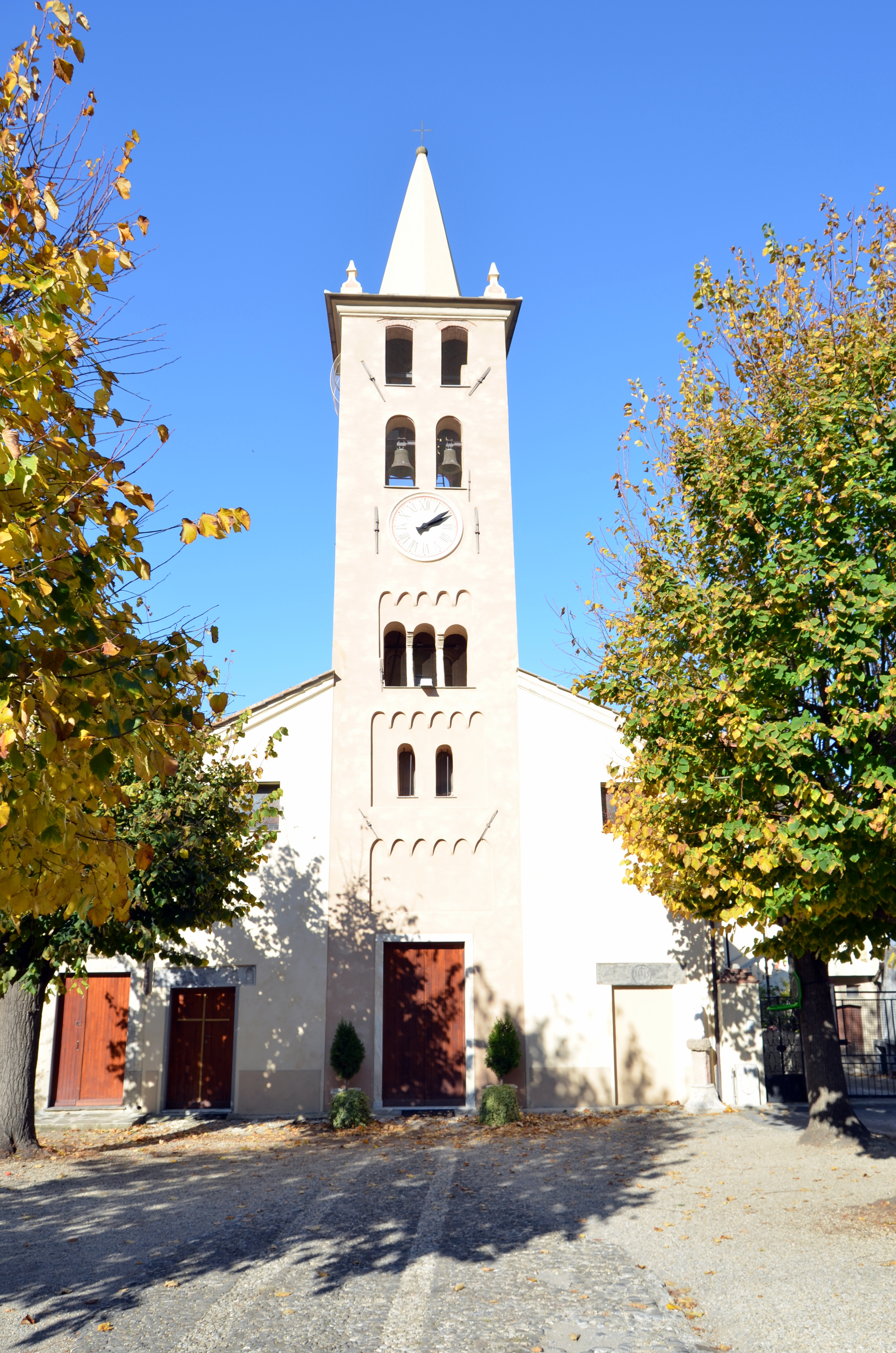
- Church of Saints Simon and Jude

- Location of San Fedele in Italy
- Coordinates: 44°02′47″N 8°10′19″E
- Country: Italy
- Region: Liguria
- Province: Savona
- Comune: Albenga
- Elevation: 20 m (66 ft)

Population
  - Total: 1,100
- Time zone: UTC+1 (CET)
  - Summer (DST): UTC+2 (CEST)
- Postal code: 17031
- Patron saint: Saints Simon and Jude

San Fedele (or Sanfè in Ligurian) is a hamlet of about 1,000 inhabitants in the municipality of Albenga, in the Province of Savona, bordering the fraction of Lusignano. Located about 2 km from Albenga, it consists of a historic nucleus on a ridge on the hills behind and an area of houses along the provincial road that goes from Albenga to Villanova d'Albenga, up to the Centa.

In the hamlet there is a complex of public housing, a kindergarten that was previously an elementary school. There is a complex currently being restored, which was a college for elementary and middle schools in use until the 1980s. There is the villa called Casa Calvi where a fresco by Albenga is represented which, even if not representative of reality, made it possible to evaluate the physical geography of the city in the fifteenth century.

== History ==
The first traces of the community are found in 1288 in the statutes of Albenga, while the church dedicated to Saints Simone il Cananeo and Giuda Taddeo, protectors of the Republic of Genoa, dates back to 1347. In 1470 there is the foundation of the brotherhood dedicated to St. John Baptist. It is known that the rector and the parishioners commissioned a polyptych of considerable value from the Pavese painter Francesco Ferrari in 1483, which was paid for in 1491 but which was subsequently lost.

Many of the noble families of Albenga built villas in San Fedele, such as Casa Calvi, to be able to holiday in the countryside for fear of malaria. In the sixteenth century San Fedele was chosen by the lords Alessandro and Ottavio Costa to erect a palace of ancient statues and frescoes, with a spacious garden and water sources, built in the Pianbellino region (now lost, in which there were paintings and marbles accumulated by Count Ottavio, whose family was already enrolled in the Genoese nobility in 1576. Another Villa is that of Casa Calvi in which one of the oldest and probably true frescoes of how the city of Albenga looked in the sixteenth century is preserved.

In 1631 there were 498 inhabitants, however during the following century there was a slight depopulation.

In 1889 an elementary school was founded which served the hamlets of San Fedele and Lusignano. Then the Ursulines nuns arrive who give life to the girls' boarding school in the Borea-Ricci villa operating in education according to the principles of the Catholic religion. In this period the parish priest was Don Tomaso Raimondo who wrote 6 notebooks of local chronicles, from which it was possible to deduce the history of the last century of San Fedele.

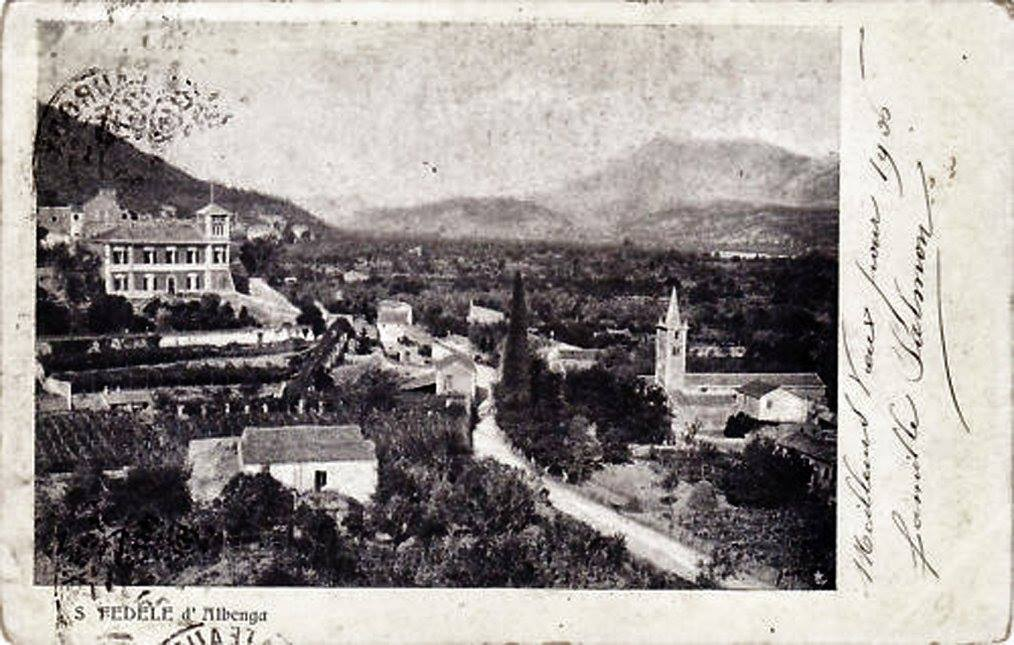
San Fedele and the Villa Borea Ricci in the 1906

During the First World War there were many who were enlisted, so much so that during a women's protest on 19 and 20 March 1917, the army had to intervene to arrest 26 women who had come down from San Fedele to Albenga to protest with shouts like "Down with the war, for two years we have had husbands at war and we want them at home, down with the Royal Commissariat and down with the Town Hall" - "Down with the refugees, down with the ambushed, either on your face or soldiers, move on, rebel it's time to stop it ", as well as for having torn posters posted by the local authority to invite citizens to calm down. That day there were women with sticks and equipped with stones that broke the tables of the Modern Cafe and the glass of a photography advertisement, and also tried to damage the post office. It is not known what happened to these women, probably a few nights in jail and then returned home to work in the fields, but it is an episode that makes us understand the stubbornness of the women of this country.

In the Second World War San Fedele made his contribution, with fifteen fallen killed by the Nazi-Fascist madness. Among these we remember the story of some: Fugassa Emilio Samuele (Loano, 14/02/1897) and his brother Fugassa Emilio Domenico killed on 28/12/1944 at the mouth of the river Centa; the other brother Giovanni Fugassa (Loano, 05/06/1902) was shot at the mouth on 27/12/1944; Samuele's son, Marco, only 22 years old, was a draft dodger and soon after enlisted in the VI Div. Garibaldi, I ^ Brigata (I Ligure area), exactly from 16/2/1945 (as shown in note no. 3016 of the Regional Commission of Liguria pursuant to DLL n.518 / 1945). A noteworthy anecdote is that of the American soldier who rushed to Monte Bignone and fled to San Fedele, where he was captured and taken to the central square of Albenga as a trophy. Others were the martyrs for freedom, among them: Terrera Giovanni, nom de guerre Biondo, part of the SAP div. Fumagalli Brigade Savona, born in Albenga on 09/24/1924 and fell on 06/21/1924 in Saliceto during the clashes with the Nazis. Also Bruno Andrea Giulio, arrested on 12/30/1944 in nearby Lusignano and murdered the next day in San Fedele by a German soldier and an Italian collaborator who have never been identified. For the roundups of Lusignano and San Fedele, among others, Mauro Sansoni, an officer of the San Marco, was punished, who was arrested and taken to Savona to be shot on April 28.

In the cemetery a chapel was built with the bodies of the martyrs of freedom, with the epigraph in memory:

Sfidarono i tempi insidi di oppressione: vendetta. Loro insegna fu la libertà degli spiriti e per essa fu la giovane gagliarda pura immolazione. Il grande olocausto sia nei tempi monito eloquente, guida sicura per le popolazioni di oggi e di domani - La popolazione memore in ricordo pose. XI - VI MCMXLVI They defied the insidious times of oppression: revenge. They teaches was the freedom of the spirits and for it was the young vigorous pure immolation. May the great holocaust be an eloquent warning in time, a sure guide for the populations of today and tomorrow - The mindful population in remembrance posed. XI - VI MCMXLVI

In the second post-war period, small industrial, artisanal and commercial plants were built, as social housing complexes and with special agreements.

== Monuments and places of interest ==
=== Religious architectures ===
- Church of Saints Simon and Jude
- Oratory of John the Baptist

=== Civil architectures ===
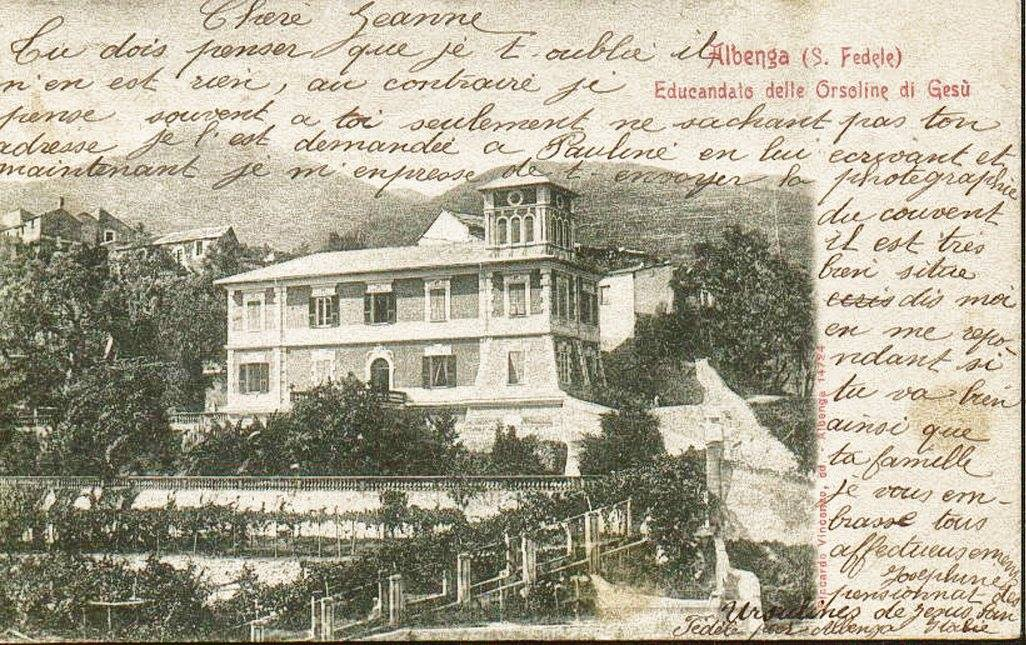
The old Villa Borea Ricci, the future school of the ursulines

- Villa Calvi
- Villa Piambellino
- The Cemetery

==== School of the Ursulines ====
In the eighteenth century an otium villa was built by the ingauna noble family of the Borea Ricci. In France, following the Combes law of 1903, a period of secularization of the state began where Catholic schools were closed and the nuns who taught there could choose between following the path with a secular life or moving. So it happened for 14 Ursuline nuns (called Ursulines de Jesus in France) who left Saint Tropez and got off the train in Albenga on 31 July headed to the Villa of San Fedele, guests of the Marquis Borea Ricci. At that time the structure was one of the country villas of the Albenganian nobility built in the previous centuries, a 3-storey house with a turret, probably an older structure that underwent modifications during the 19th century. After a few months, on 29 September the courses began with the first 16 French students, to which 7 Italian students were added on 1 October. The Villa, meanwhile called Villa Giulia, is transformed into a female training institute taking the name of Villa Sacro Cuore where the girls were guaranteed a path that led them from the nursery school to the teaching institute. In an article in the weekly Pro Familia of 1909, the structure was advertised as follows: Colleggio Female Boarding School in S. Fedele d'Albenga, directed by the Ursulines of Jesus. Excellent religious and civil education - Study courses in Italian and French given by authorized teachers - Preparation for complementary and normal licenses; according to government programs - music, drawing, painting, etc ... Splendid, elevated position, view of the sea, healthy air, mild climate, moderate straight line. Ask the Director for the program.

The first extension of the building dates from these years, with the raising of two floors of the structure. In 1936 the legal recognition of the middle school and the teaching institute arrives. In 1955 the first orphans of the Guardia di Finanza were welcomed.

In recent years the complex underwent a major expansion, creating new classrooms, new rooms and even an internal church in a modern style not in line with the existing one, which however is preserved.

In the following years both nuns and enrollments decreased, although in the meantime the courses also became accessible to males: the middle school was moved to Albenga in 1987 to be closed three years later. On November 21, 1991, the community dissolves. Some nuns decide to keep the task by moving to Loreto or Turin. Others prefer to stay in this place where they lived part of their lives, residing in the Villa San Marco, a building inside the complex. However, the religious did not stop their work completely, remaining active within the community, helping families and being very active in parish activities.

Meanwhile, the main building is being sold to private individuals to find a new life as a residence. In 2009 a project was made in agreement with the superintendent to demolish the modern part while preserving the historical one, with the creation of a widespread village that could be in line with the structure of the village of San Fedele. However this project will never come to an end [8]. Now abandoned to itself, the structure is in decline, occasionally becoming a meeting place for the homeless and socially marginalized.

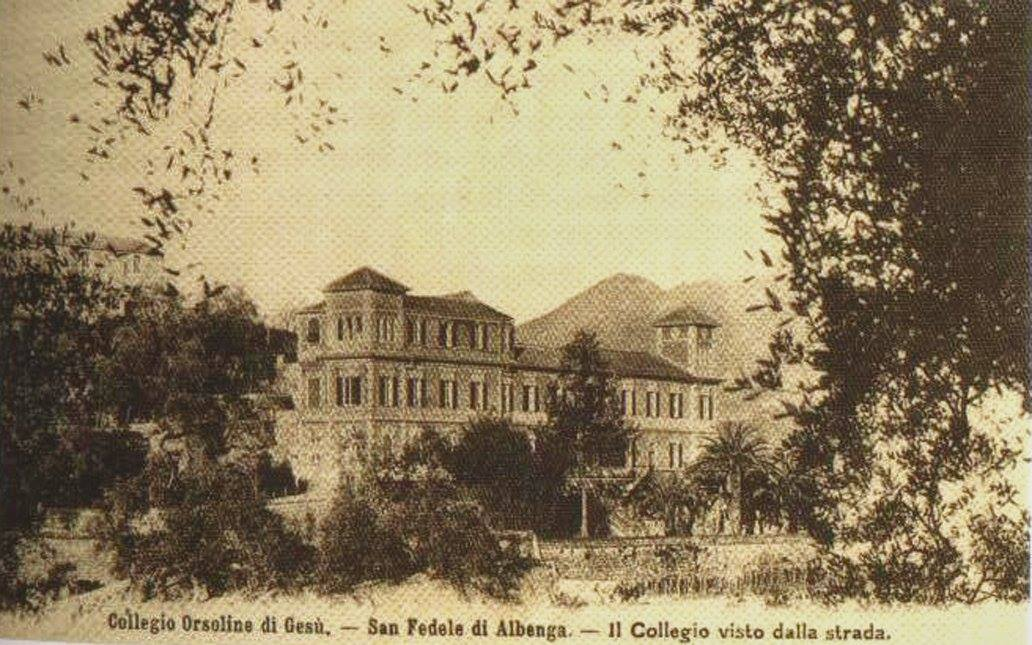
The school of the Ursulines

In October 2003 the centenary of the presence of the sisters in the community was celebrated [9]. In October 2017, the last 3 sisters also left San Fedele, where with a mass, the bishop of Albenga Guglielmo Borghetti, thanks for the work done in over a century in the community of San Fedele. One nun retired to the rest home of the Cottolengo Sisters in Moncalieri, another to the community of the Consolata Sanctuary in Turin and the third remained in Albenga. On this occasion, there were many students who paid their thanks for the work done. The ex-boarding school is protected by the strict obligation of the superintendency since 2002 with the code NCTN 07/00208366.

==== Villa Costa in Pianbellino ====
In the hamlet of San Fedele there is an ancient villa of the Costa family, where only a little has remained, but which has been well described over the centuries, so much so that we can still see the architecture of when it was built. Privately owned and left much to itself. A massive arched portal with ashlar treatment leads into the main square to the old house and to the tower, where the chapel of San Giovanni Battista and a short side of the destroyed villa of Piambellino overlook. After a part of noble gardens intended for the family, there was a part of vegetable gardens, vineyards, olive groves, land cultivated with wheat, houses of peasants and servants. Particular was the tower-belvedere, flanked by a terrace with a brick floor, perhaps a part that remained from the first loggia of the entrance to the courtyard. Under the road, the current provincial SP6, there was the exedra with meadows planted with fruit trees, the vineyard of marvasia and the ditches.

Between the end of the 16th century and the first half of the 18th century the brothers of the noble Ingauna Costa family, Pier Francesco (1545-1625) apostolic nuncio to the court of Carlo Emanuele I of Savoy, and bishop of Savona, Alessandro (1555-1623), abbot commentary at the atrium of Santa Maria and San Martino on the Gallinara Island, Ottavio 1554-1639 holder of the General Depositary of the Apostolic Chamber under the reign of Gregory XIV and Innocent IV as well as a banker, and the son of this Pier Francesco (1591-1653) bishop of Albenga, committed many of their resources to build a place of otium that was a link between the utilitas and venustas with ancient marbles, paintings, precious and much more, to create a cultured environment. The Costa family were an important family at the time, who owned several villas in the Albenga countryside, but also resided in Rome, where among others they owned the Villa of San Martino ai Monti, neighbors of Alessandro Peretti di Montalto, for which they carried out financial transitions or intervened for purchases of art objects.

The site of the villa was likely occupied by an earlier structure, situated in an area characterized by abundant water supplies and a shaded, well-ventilated microclimate. From the mid-15th century, the Costa family began acquiring land in the area, frequently adjacent to properties owned by the Abbey of San Marino on Gallinara Island - an institution periodically governed by members of the family. On July 6, 1562, the family acquired the primary villa in Pianbellino from Bernardo Riccio for 600 scudi. The family subsequently developed the estate into a major landscape complex, building upon existing geometric layouts and river-pebble retaining walls. Historical documentation of the site includes an account by historian Gio Ambrogio Paneri, who described the estate of Pier Francesco, Ottavio, and Alessandro Costa as featuring decorated townhouses, a palace housing statues and paintings, and irrigated gardens. Additionally, an ink and watercolor drawing by Bernardo Railbado, titled Villa di Piambellino, depicts the main building as an architectural anchor for the surrounding properties during the 16th and 17th centuries.

During the 1800s, the historian Giuseppe Cottalasso, transcribed a series of tombstones and inscriptions that were kept in the ancient palace of the Costa di Balestrino house, in the suburbs of Albenga, a region called Ciambellino, saying that those transcribed were handwritten copies and not that those had already been copied previously. They were placed on the pedestals of as many statues. In the drawing of the Raibado four fountains are indicated, which meant an underground pipe network the entire property.

The villa belonged to Ottavio Costa, the only one capable of guaranteeing the descent, which he did in his will in 1639 in favor of his second-born nephew Filippo, leaving Monsignor Pier Francesco, bishop of Albenga and uncle of Filippo, the possibility of free access to the villa, and to use what is contained therein, as long as everything is returned. On Filippo's death, the estate passed to his other son Pier Francesco (1639-1723) who died without leaving heirs, passing everything to Ottaviano del Carretto, his sister's nephew, who wanted to add his grandmother's surname, becoming Costa Del Carretto; thanks to him we have an inventory of the villa drawn up on February 26, 1700. On the death of Pier Francesco in 1726 there is still a list of what it was, which is given to the owner, the Marquis Domenico Donato Costa Del Carretto, son of Ottaviano, where the villa was described with gardens, vineyards, fig trees, arable land, with a pine tree, and various cypress trees.

On the occasion of the French occupation of 10 February 1797 there is a letter in which important damage to the structure caused by the military is reported. Another letter dated 18 June 1834 reports an evaluation of the property, where it is still intact. The marked poor state of maintenance of the house, which was defined already dilapidated in the mid-nineteenth century, was the main cause of its collapse, although it is likely that the last end occurred following the earthquake of 1887.

Since 1937 the villa has had the precise architectural bond, with the name of Villa del Ciambellino Bertolotto, which was owned by Mr. Gozo Candido Di Domenico. In the nineteenth century the main portal is still preserved, as can still be seen inside a part of the black and white cobblestone paving. There are still two avenues of ornate columns on the back, some of the existing houses are parts of houses that survived from the previous villa.

=== The cemetery ===
In 1832 the "Senatorial Manifesto" was issued by the King, according to which the dead would no longer be able to bury themselves in churches or villages for health reasons; a land is chosen for the burial outside the town. The choice immediately falls on a plot of land of 1930 square meters, owned by Giuseppe Rolando, known as Acqua Calda , located in the road leading to the mill, but the land is too large, since an area of 110 square meters plus a part destined to epidemics for a maximum of 200 square meters, for a population of 296 units with a five-year mortality of 33. So you change your mind, going to the land called "i Polli" by Giuliano Caraffa fu Giobatta, of 176 square meters plus a passage on the public road of 32 square meters, for a total of 208 square meters paid for a total of 45.70 lire. For this period there is probably a very limited structure with an external wall to delimit the area. In 1874 it is known that 100 square meters were built but that 200 square meters were needed. Already in 1878 the prefect reported that the cemetery did not have a mortuary to be able to practice funeral ceremonies and in 1883 he asked the Municipal Administration for explanations regarding the progress of the works but the administration replies that 1000 Lire have been allocated for the cemetery of Leca which was most needed. In July 1945 the parish gave free land to the Municipality of Albenga for the construction of a chapel capable of housing fifteen corpses of the Martyrs of the Foce. Currently the cemetery occupies an area of 570 square meters plus a part of 80 square meters intended for parking.

== See also ==
- Albenga
- Lusignano

== Bibliography ==
- Lamboglia Nino, Albenga romana e medioevale, Ist. Inter. Studi Liguri, Bordighera 1966
- Costa Restagno Josepha, Albenga, Sagep Editrice,1985
- Romano Strizioli, Sebastiano Gandolfo, Erica Marzo, Albenga: un secolo di storia (1900-2000), F.lli Stalla di Albenga, Albenga, 2007, ISBN 978-88-901943-7-5
- Pierpaolo Rivello, Le stragi nell'albenganese del 1944 e 1945, Torino, Sottosopra edizioni, 2011.
- Ferruccio Iebole e Pino Fragalà, Lo chiamavano Cimitero, Albenga, Scripsi, tracce d'autore, 2020.
