= Gallinara =

Island in Liguria, Italy

Isola Gallinara
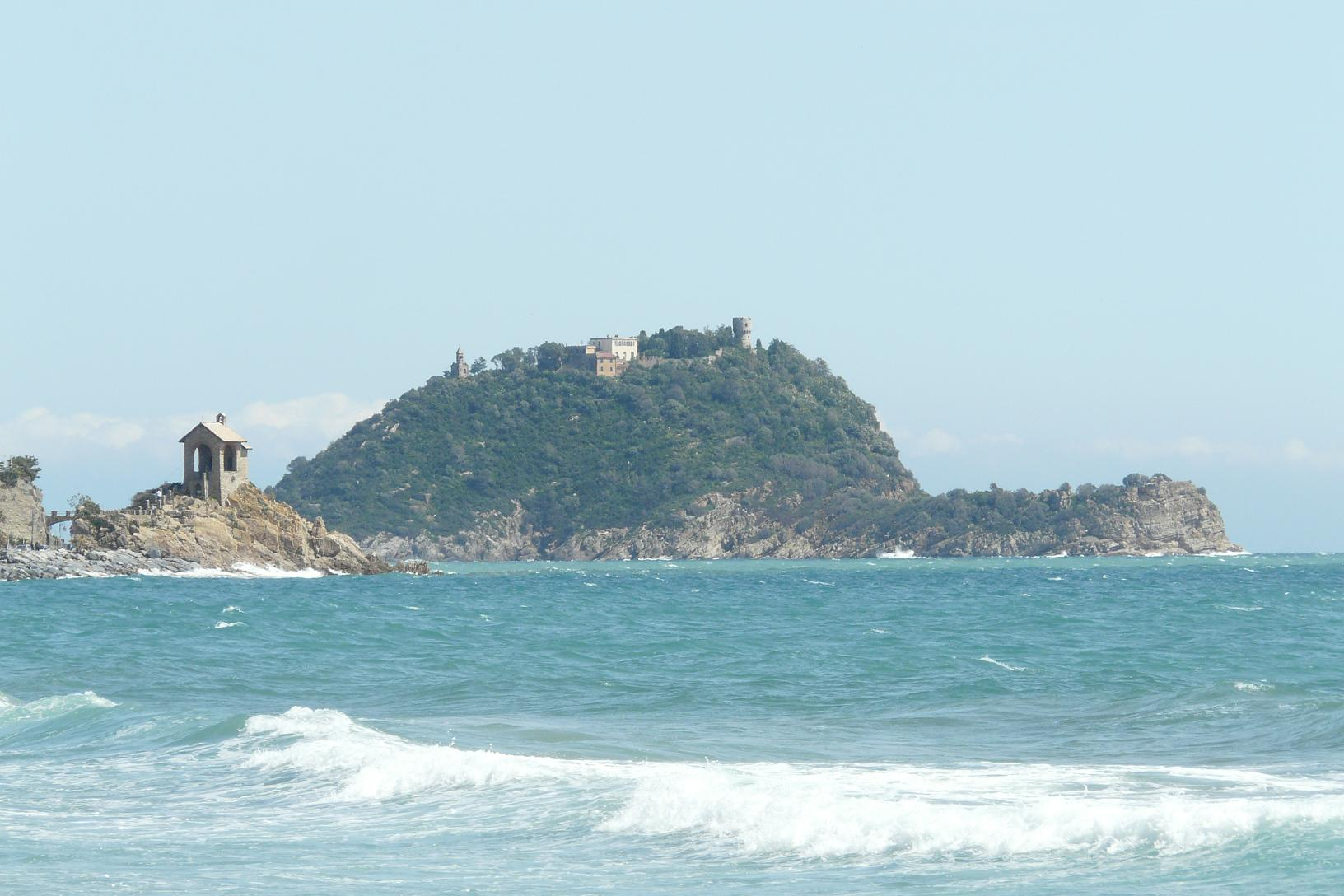

- Location within Italy

Geography
- Location: Ligurian Sea
- Coordinates: 44°01′32″N 8°13′34″E
- Area: .11 km^{2} (0.042 sq mi)
- Highest elevation: 87 m (285 ft)

Administration
- Italy
- Region: Liguria
- Province: Savona
- Communes: Albenga

Demographics
- Population: 0

Gallinara Island (known as Isola Gallinara in italian, anciently Isola d'Albenga, Ìsua Gainâa in ligurian) is a small, isolated private island that lies in the Ligurian Sea off the coast of Albenga in the Province of Savona, Liguria, northern Italy. It is known for its unique humped shape, resembling a turtle and its large population of Herring Gulls.

== Etymology ==
The name comes from “gallina” (Italian for hens) as a population of moorhens used to populate the island.

== Geography ==
The island is 11 hectare and its highest point is at 87 meters. The island is equidistant between Marina di Alassio and the coastal city of Albenga, both located on the mainland just a few kilometres from the island.

== History ==
On the island, then called Gallinara, Martin, destined to become Saint Martin of Tours, decided in his youth to seek shelter and live the solitary life of a hermit, before he joined Hilary of Poitiers in Gaul. The wreck of a Roman ship has been found in the waters of its coast. It was owned by the church until 1842. During World War II the island was occupied by German soldiers. In late 2020, the island was reported to be sold to Ukrainian aerospace tycoon Oleksander Boguslayev for 25 million euros, with criticism by politicians and locals, as the island is considered a heritage site by many. However, the island was not sold and reverted to being public when it was acquired by MiBACT, the Italian Ministry of Culture.

== Nature conservation ==
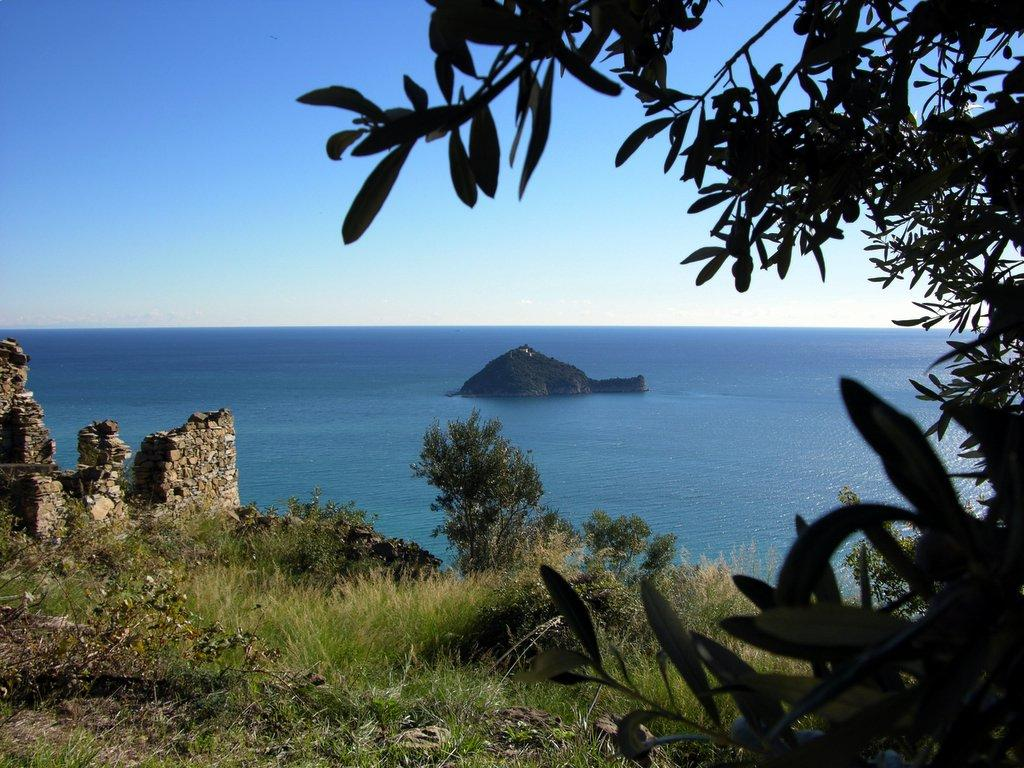
Gallinara Island

The island is protected as the Riserva Naturale Regionale dell'Isola Gallinara, established in 1989. It's a shelter for the herring gull, with one of the largest colonies of this bird in the Mediterranean, and for rare plant species and stretches of intact shallow sea floor. It is also included in a SIC (Site of Community Importance) called Isola Gallinara (code IT1324908 ).

== See also ==
- List of islands of Italy
- Italian Riviera
