= Albenga =

- Comune
- Comune di Albenga
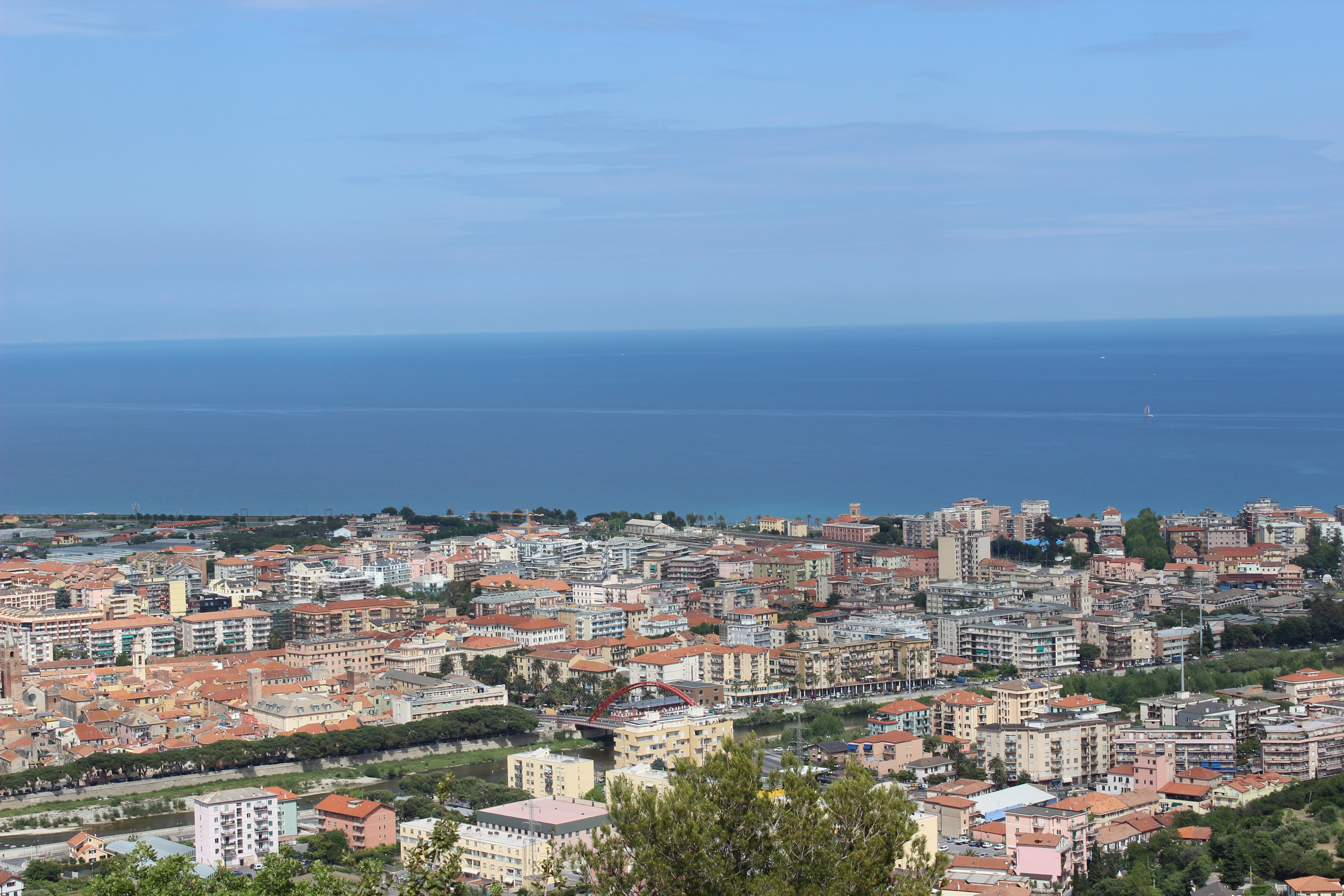

- Flag Coat of arms

- Location of Albenga in Italy Albenga (Liguria)
- Coordinates: 44°03′N 8°13′E
- Country: Italy
- Region: Liguria
- Province: Savona (SV)
- Frazioni: Bastia, Campochiesa, Leca, Lusignano, Salea, San Fedele

Government
  - Mayor: Riccardo Tomatis

Area
  - Total: 36.51 km^{2} (14.10 sq mi)
- Elevation: 5 m (16 ft)

Population (31 December 2010)
  - Total: 24,378
  - Density: 667.7/km^{2} (1,729/sq mi)
- Demonym: Ingauni or Albenganesi
- Time zone: UTC+1 (CET)
  - Summer (DST): UTC+2 (CEST)
- Postal code: 17031
- Dialing code: 0182
- Patron saint: Saint Michael the Archangel
- Saint day: 29 September
- Website: Official website

Albenga (Ligurian: Arbenga; Latin: Albingaunum) is a city and comune situated on the Gulf of Genoa on the Italian Riviera in the Province of Savona in Liguria, northern Italy.

Albenga has the nickname of city of a hundred spires. The economy is mostly based on tourism, local commerce and agriculture.

Albenga has six hamlets: Lusignano, San Fedele, Campochiesa, Leca, Bastia, Salea.

== Name ==
The name of Albenga comes from the Latin Albíngaunum that comes from Album Ingaunum, that it means the capital city + genitive plural in -um. The ethnonym Ingauni (Ingauners) consists of Indo-European origin, and a name of Gaulish-ligurian land. Album comes from "alb o alp" an ancient pre-Indo-European (rock, hill), often erroneously associated to "album" a Latin word meaning white or clear. The first name was Album Ingaunum, but when it was conquered by the Romans, the name became Albingaunum; after the Roman Empire the name became Albinauno and near the 1000 became Albingano. Only in the 14th century the name has become Albenga.

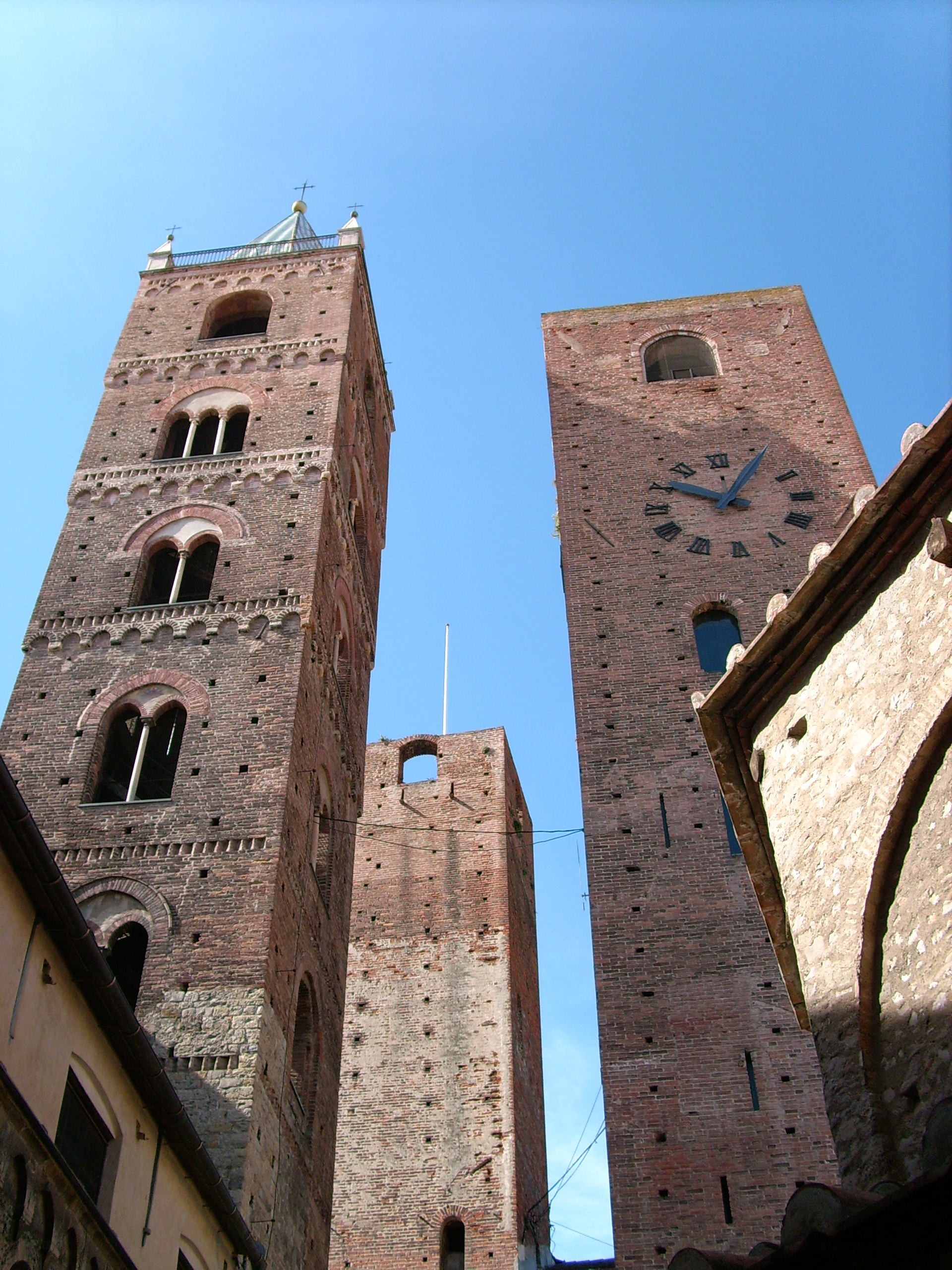
Towers of Albenga.

== History ==
=== Early history ===
Albenga was founded around the 4th century BC on the slopes of the coastal hill. Albenga used to be the capital of the Ingauni, a Ligurian tribe. The Ingauners were sailors and traders, and they owned a large territory between Finale and Sanremo.

=== Roman period ===
During the Second Punic War the town of Albenga was allied with the Carthaginians, but was defeated by the Romans under proconsul Lucius Aemilius Paullus Macedonicus in 181 BC. The following year the Romans and the Ingauni signed a foedus (alliance agreement) which started the total Romanization of the whole region. Put under Latin rights in 89 BC, Albingaunum was granted Roman citizenship in 45 BC under Julius Caesar, starting to enjoy, with the beginning of the Empire, a period of prosperity. A further boost for the city came from the building of the Via Julia Augusta (13 BC), linked with southern France and Spain. In the meantime the intense exploitation of the flat land around the city continued; an inscription records the restoration of the walls, forum, and harbor, by Constantius in A.D. 354.

=== Late Antiquity ===
While historical documentation is scarce, archaeological excavations indicate that Albenga was a significant town during Late Antiquity. In 451, the presence of a bishop from Albenga at a synod at Milan indicates that Albenga's see was likely the most significant in western Liguria at the time.

During the 5th century, the city suffered from raids by the Visigoths, who partly destroyed and looted Albenga. The old Municipium, now in poor condition, was reconstructed with the support of Emperor Constantius III. His intervention provided stability and a defensive structure, ensuring the city's survival in the centuries that followed.

The city was listed among the coastal civitates downsized to villages (vici) by Rothari, king of the Lombards, as documented by Fredegar in the 660s.

=== Middle Ages ===
Albenga established itself as a medieval municipality in 1098; in that same year Albenga joined to the First Crusade with its own banner, troops and money, receiving the rights of free trade by the King of Jerusalem. From that time on, the Golden Red Cross flag was displayed on its own ships and towers.

Later on, after the invasion of northern Italy by emperor Frederick Barbarossa, the city supported him and joined to Ghibelline coalition which was never abandoned during the following centuries. In 1159 Albenga received the imperial investiture for all its territory.

=== Modern era ===
In 1798 Albenga was declared capital of the Centa Jurisdiction, as part of the short living constitution of the Ligurian Republic. In 1815 the city, together with the whole Liguria, was assigned to the House of Savoy (the Italian Royal family) and became part of the Kingdom of Sardinia. The town was the head city of the new province of Albenga. The new district was formed with all municipalities from Andora and Finale Ligure including the country side .

In 1863, after the unification of Italy, the province was reduced to a district, and was abolished completely in 1927. In this time Albenga was reduced to an agricultural village, overtaken by other coastal towns in both economic and demographic development. Albenga wasn't a popular holiday destination like other towns in the Italian Riviera.

== Geography ==
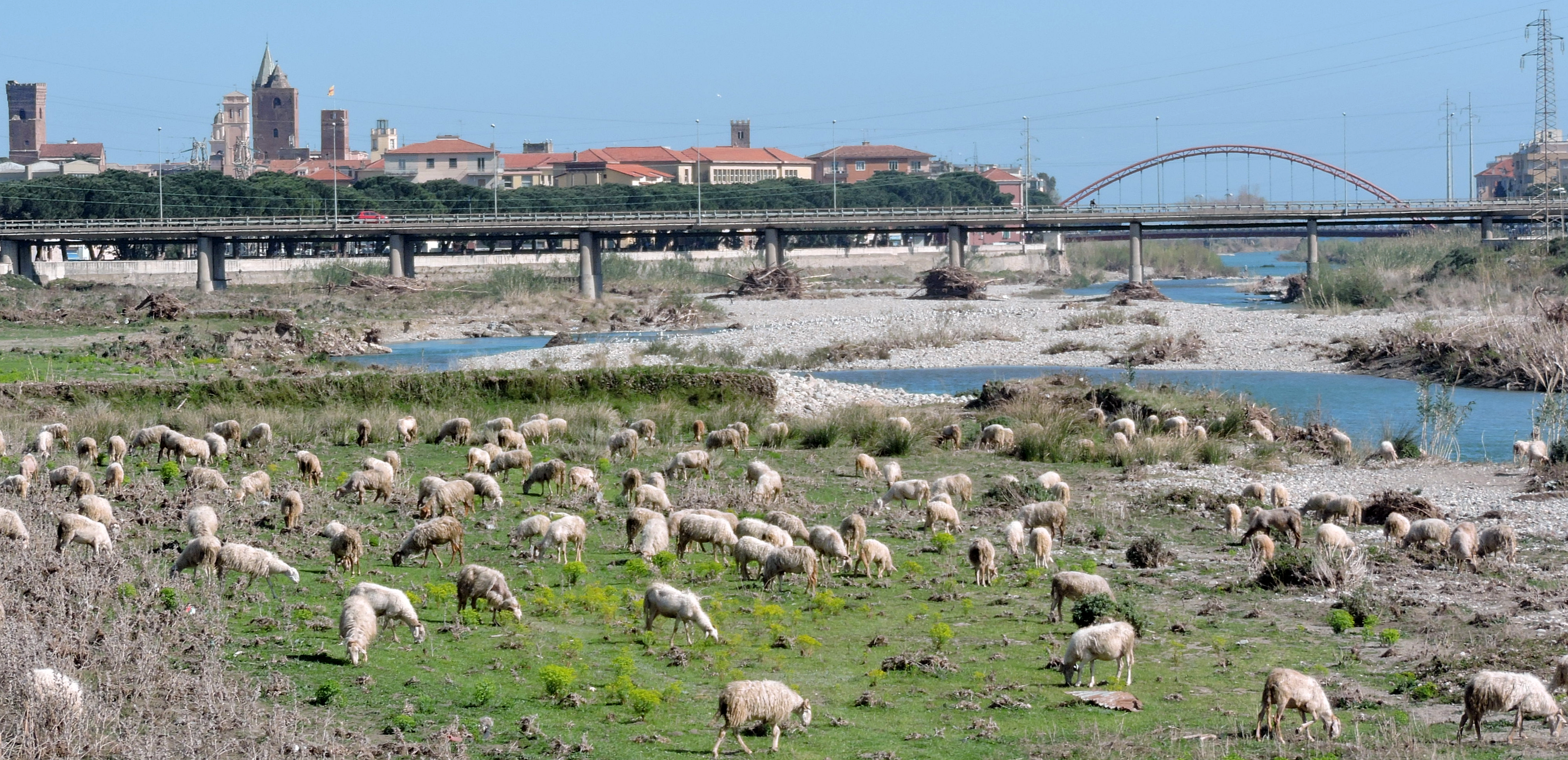
Grazing sheep in the Centa riverbed

Albenga is located in the western coast of the Italian Riviera. It has a homonymous plain at the mouth of the river Centa, which over the centuries has been the architect of the Albenga's plain, remodeling the ground several times and forcing the Albenga people to adopt embankments and bridges since its foundation. Up to the 17th century, Albenga based its economy on maritime trade, as the city was built on the mouth of the river Centa and it was surrounded by walls and bridges. During the time the river Centa has changed its natural path.

When Albenga was annexed to the Republic of Genoa, the Republic chose to bury the port to punish the rebel city and stop any possible rebellion and like natural event. Nowadays the river flows along the city centre flowing to the mouth river. Even the memory of the old bridges was deleting itself.

Albenga is the main city of the district Albenganese, which extends from Finale to Andora and all countryside. The Gallinara island is included into this district. Christian cleric and saint Martin of Tours is believed to have once lived on the island, where a monastery now stands in his honor. Since 1064 the island has been a propriety of the abbey of Abbadia Alpina.

=== Climate ===
The coastal climate is mild, featuring mild winters and warm summers. Sea breezes mitigate extreme heat, resulting in rarely very hot summers. In contrast, the Albenga plain's countryside exhibits more continental characteristics, with colder winters and hotter summers than the coastal area.

Climate data for Albenga (1981–2010 normals, extremes 1953–present)
Month	Jan	Feb	Mar	Apr	May	Jun	Jul	Aug	Sep	Oct	Nov	Dec	Year
Record high °C (°F)	22.0 (71.6)	24.6 (76.3)	24.0 (75.2)	28.0 (82.4)	32.5 (90.5)	35.0 (95.0)	37.1 (98.8)	37.0 (98.6)	33.8 (92.8)	29.3 (84.7)	25.0 (77.0)	22.0 (71.6)	37.1 (98.8)
Mean daily maximum °C (°F)	12.1 (53.8)	12.7 (54.9)	15.2 (59.4)	17.5 (63.5)	21.9 (71.4)	25.8 (78.4)	29.2 (84.6)	29.4 (84.9)	25.5 (77.9)	20.7 (69.3)	15.8 (60.4)	12.6 (54.7)	19.9 (67.8)
Daily mean °C (°F)	7.1 (44.8)	7.8 (46.0)	10.4 (50.7)	13.0 (55.4)	17.3 (63.1)	21.1 (70.0)	23.9 (75.0)	23.9 (75.0)	20.2 (68.4)	16.0 (60.8)	11.1 (52.0)	8.1 (46.6)	15.0 (59.0)
Mean daily minimum °C (°F)	2.1 (35.8)	3.0 (37.4)	5.6 (42.1)	8.5 (47.3)	12.7 (54.9)	16.5 (61.7)	18.7 (65.7)	18.4 (65.1)	15.0 (59.0)	11.3 (52.3)	6.4 (43.5)	3.5 (38.3)	10.1 (50.3)
Record low °C (°F)	−12.4 (9.7)	−11.0 (12.2)	−8.0 (17.6)	−3.0 (26.6)	−1.0 (30.2)	4.0 (39.2)	6.6 (43.9)	6.2 (43.2)	3.7 (38.7)	−1.8 (28.8)	−6.6 (20.1)	−8.6 (16.5)	−12.4 (9.7)
Average precipitation mm (inches)	101.4 (3.99)	89.7 (3.53)	90.4 (3.56)	81.6 (3.21)	76.1 (3.00)	38.2 (1.50)	21.3 (0.84)	43.3 (1.70)	55.0 (2.17)	105.5 (4.15)	96.8 (3.81)	78.9 (3.11)	878.2 (34.57)
Average precipitation days (≥ 1.0 mm)	6.2	5.2	6.1	6.6	6.5	4.0	2.8	3.8	4.4	6.4	6.3	5.0	63.3
Average relative humidity (%)	73	73	72	79	79	79	77	77	78	78	75	76	76
Source 1: Istituto Superiore per la Protezione e la Ricerca Ambientale
Source 2: Servizio Meteorologico (precipitation and humidity 1961–1990)

== Main sights ==
Built on the ancient orthogonal structure that had the current "Via Medaglie d'oro" and "Via Enrico d'Aste" respectively as the Roman camp main road axes (cardo and decumanus), the town has its planimetric hub in the historical San Michele Square. Around it some palaces were built, which were historically the seats of political and religious authorities.

=== Cathedral of St Michael Archangel ===
Built on the basic structures of the early Christian basilica put up by orders of Constantius III between the 4th and 5th century, it has a façade with traces of the transformation from Romanesque to Gothic. From this same period are the two lateral portals of the main facade and a third one the left side of the church, that hosts a restored Lombard bas-relief; the central portal dates from 1669.

The current design is the result of further elevations. The restoration works between 1964 and 1967 brought back the cathedral design to its original medieval aspect. The nearby steeple was attached to the church in the 13th century, built over the ruins of the old bell tower between the years 1391 and 1395. This construction is one of the last local examples of the use of bare bricks, progressively replaced by plastering.

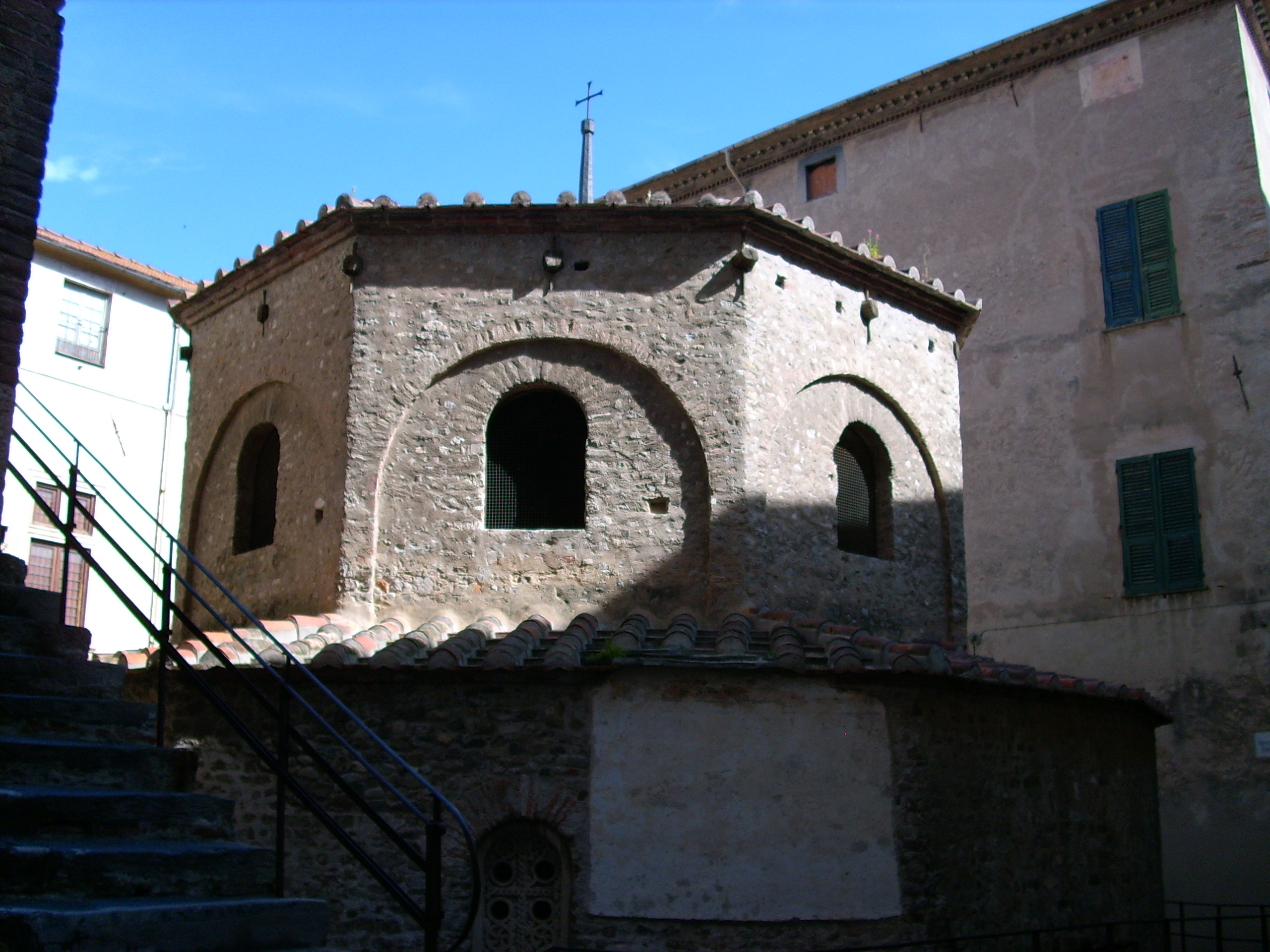
The Baptistery of Albenga.

=== Albenga Baptistery ===
The baptistery is located to the side of the cathedral, as it was typical of the early Christian structures, and can be visited from the Loggia of the old City Hall Palace. It has an octagonal interior dating to the 5th century. The current appearance dates from a late 19th-century restoration work, carried on by Alfredo D'Andrade. During those works, the original basin vaulted roof, built with the Byzantine-Ravennate technique of the "tubi fittili" (terracotta tubes), was completely destroyed. The mosaic decorations of the vault of the presbytery go back to the 5th and 6th centuries.

=== Old City Hall Palace ===
Dating back to the early 14th century, it has undergone several renovations over the years before receiving its present appearance.

It housed the Council Hall (the big bell still calls the citizens when the council committee meets in the new town hall) and the jail. The lower floor dates from the 14th century, while the upper one was reconstructed in 1387–1391. The façade towards the baptistery has Ghibelline-style merlons with two large staircases. Since 1933, it houses the Ingauni Museum. The latter, established in 1933 by Nino Lamboglia, collects objects and medieval Roman (sculptures, inscriptions, sarcophagi and 15th-century frescoes), archaeological and epigraphic collections.

=== Old Bishop's Palace ===
Located near the baptistery, it dates from the 11th century, with a 13th-century portal. It is the seat of the local bishop and houses the Holy Art Museum. The wing leading to the baptistery show several construction phases from the 13th and 14th centuries. The decoration with black and white stripes was added in 1463 under bishop Napoleone Fieschi. The heraldic fresco is by Giovanni Canavesio (1477).

The Diocesan Museum of Albenga occupies a series of rooms decorated with frescoes, it houses works of art and findings from the excavation of the cathedral. Among the paintings stand out a St. John attributed to Caravaggio and The Martyrdom of Saint Catherine by Guido Reni.

=== Ancient remains ===
Restructured by Emperor Augustus in 13 BC, the Via Julia Augusta was the most important communication link in the Italian Riviera until the construction of the Napoleonic situated close to the sea; the current site of the Via Aurelia. Its path, with plenty of Roman buildings destined to funerary celebrations, makes an archaeological walk beautiful also from a panoramic and naturalistic point of view.

Albenga is also home to the remains of a Roman amphitheatre dating from the 3rd century BC. It represents the only example of theatrical construction knowns on the entire Western part of the Italian Riviera. Albenga is placed to a short distance from the Amphitheatre and the Via Julia Augusta. The funeral monument is called the Pilone, standing over the eastern slope of the Mount. This is the most renowned and characteristic Ingauner funeral monument.

Also in the mount area is the Palaeo-Christian Basilica of S. Calocero (4th–5th century). It has built on the latter martyr's tomb.

Other archaeological side and interest points are:

- South of the historical center is an archaeological area discovered during the excavations for the enlargement of the river banks between 20and 2002. Here, by the river, were found the ruins of the old thermal system and the early Christian site with the medieval San Clemente Church.
- Pontelungo ("Long Bridge"), a medieval water main (c. 13th century). The Sanctuary of Nostra Signora di Pontelungo (early 18th century) is located close .
- Palazzo Peloso Cepolla (16th century). It has got a corner tower since the 13th century. The entrance hall houses a fresco depicting the Roman usurper Proculus, while the piano nobile has got several Renaissance and Roman marble busts. It is home of the Roman Naval Museum, established in 1950. It shows more than a thousand Roman amphorae recovered from a ship in the 1st century BC, sank in the waters of Albenga. It was the first Roman cargo ship discovered and explored the bottom of the Ligurian Sea. There is also a section regarding the caves of prehistoric materials from val Pennavaira.
- Torre Oddo, a tower with typical Ghibelline merlons
- The piazzetta dei Leoni ("Lions' Square"), situated between the cathedral's apse and the Costa's family medieval buildings. The latter brought the three Renaissance-style peperino lions from which the square has taken its name in 1608.
- Museum of the Oil Civilization. Located in an old mill site owned by the family Sommariva, it is an ethnographic exhibition dedicated to the processing of olives, olive oil and wine.

== Tourism ==
Besides being an important historical town, Albenga is a coastal and touristic resort town of the Italian Riviera. The coast of Albenga has a length of some 4 km (2.48 miles) of fine sand mixed with pebbles, with bathing establishments. The coast is divided in small public beaches and other managed and fully beach equipped ran by private entrepreneurs. The sea promenade is long 3 km (1.86 miles)

The private island of Gallinara is less than one naval mile from Albenga.

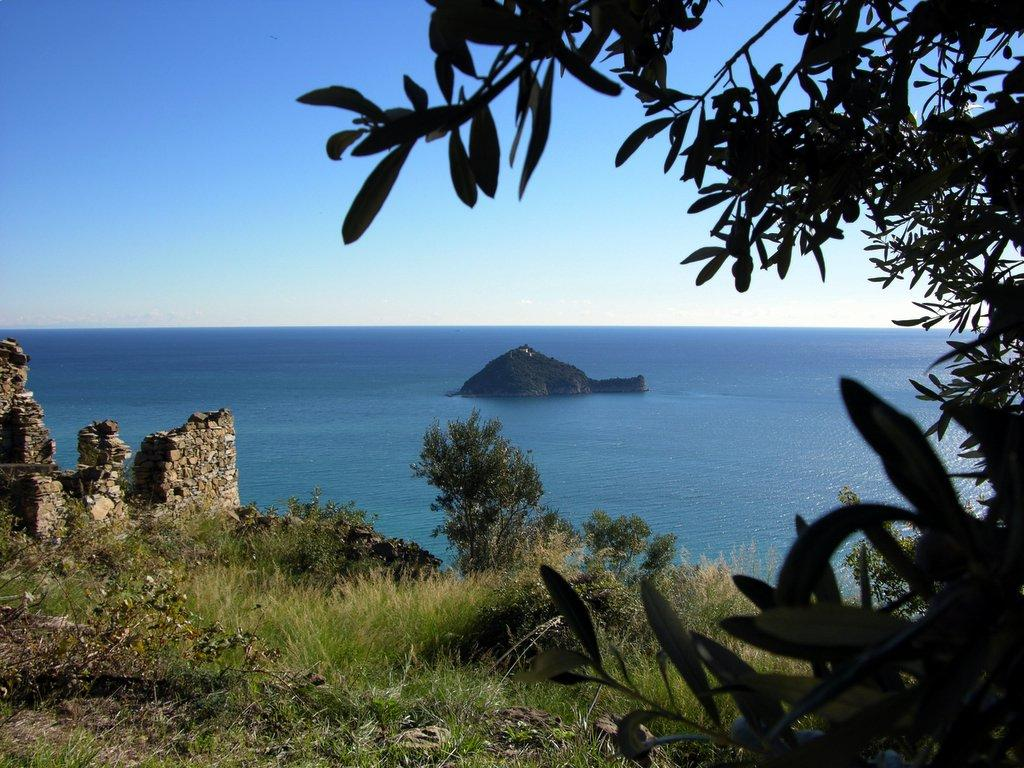
Gallinara Island.

== Educations ==
Albenga is home to the following secondary schools:

- Professional Institute of Agriculture and the Environment "Domenico Aicardi".
- State Industrial Technical Institute "Galileo Galilei".
- Scientific High School "Giordano Bruno with attached classical section" Giovanni Pascoli "*Educational Diocesan"
- "Redemptoris Mater" Diocesan School Center, high-school with classic section and socio-psycho-pedagogical
- Diocesan Seminary historic institution that for centuries, along with Palazzo Oddo, has educated citizens. Currently active in the modern home built by Angelo Cambiaso and active in the education of future priests of the diocese.

The Higher Institute of Religious Studies (often abbreviated ISSR) is a university that promotes the study and scientific research on religion.

== Typical dishes ==
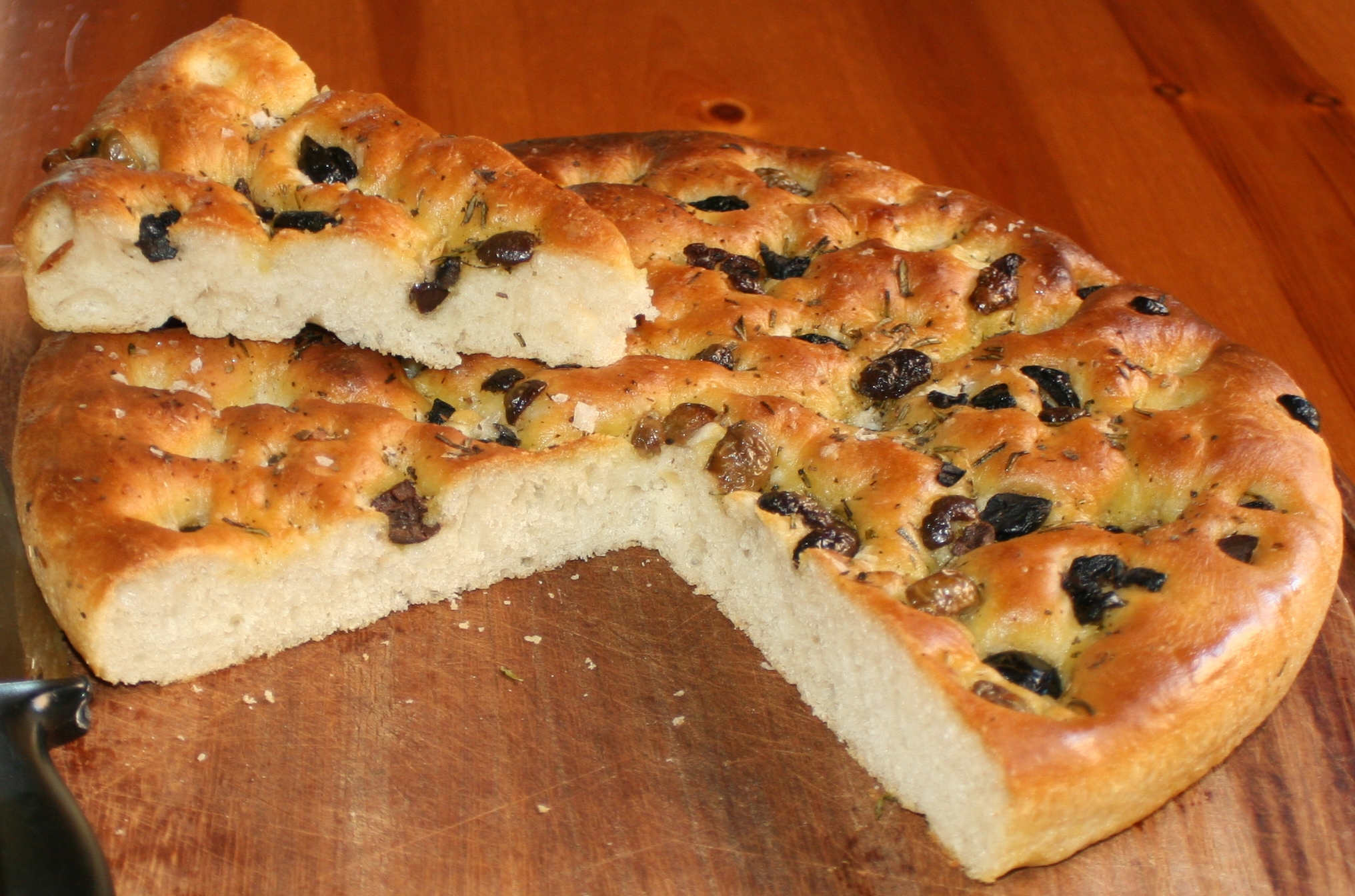
Focaccia with olives

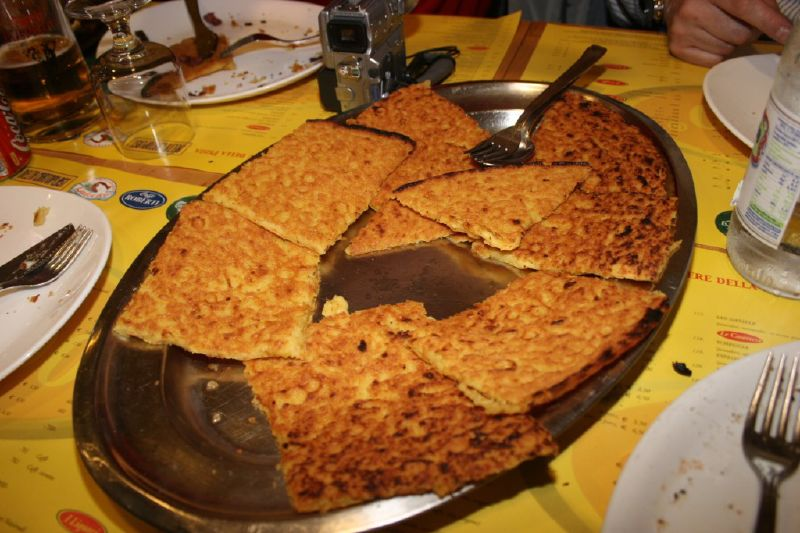
Farinata

Local delicacies include:

- Purple Asparagus
- zucchini trumpet
- artichoke
- beefsteak tomato
- The biscuits with fennel seeds, called in local dialect Baxin d'Arbenga ("Kiss of Albenga")
- The extra virgin olive oil Taggiasca
- [Genoese Pesto]
- The "caviar" of Centa
- Farinata, a type of unleavened pancake or crêpe made from chickpea flour
- Fritters of Bianchetti
- Focaccia Genoese a type of Italian flatbread
- Ciappe oil
- olives Taggiasca in brine
- Peaches with Pigato

Drinks include:

- White wines Pigato, Vermentino and Lumassina
- The red wines Ormeasco and Rossese
- Grappa with artichoke and bitter orange
- Liquor violet asparagus

== Main Events ==
- Palio dei Rioni Ingauni: Fourth July weekend, a festival regarding the four neighbourhood of the old town: St. Giovanni, St. Eulalia, San Siro and Santa Maria; all contender are wearing medieval dresses.
- Celebration of Madonna di Pontelungo : on 2 July with the religious procession, stalls and fireworks;
- Green Night: The first Saturday of September, a festival called la notte verde ( the green night) because the town is decorated with plants, flowers and vegetables;
- Albenga Flower: spring flower festival in the old town of Albenga;
- Sagralea: A big festival regarding the Wine Pigato and other quality wines of the Italian Riviera in the last week of August at the hamlet of Salea. This event is included in "Road of Wine and Oil";
- Festival Du Burgu: it takes place in the hamlet of Bastia in the last week of August;
- Festival du Michettin: in the locality of San Giorgio, a festival regarding the local dish called Michettin in Ligurian dialect (pan fritto in italian and bread fried in English);
- Celebration of Saint Michael: Albenga celebrates its saint patron on 29 September;
- Celebration of Saint Lucia: Felt celebration for southern Italy emigrants on 13 December;
- Diocesan Gathering brotherhoods: The first Sunday in September, where for the occasion the fraternities of Diocese of Albenga-Imperia gather marching in procession with their insignia and artistic crucified.
- National Piano Competition "Città di Albenga ' It takes place 27–30 December;
- Apple House Party
- Festival of music and play "Head On": a prestigious festival that features national artists;
- Trophy National Albingaunum: National Award for the Literature;
- Trophy of Wood Slingshot: Particular trophy invented and organized by "fieui of Caruggi". It consists to give a reward to someone he has shot a good slingshot. The slings is just a metaphor; the trophy is a reward for everyone has done something to help and defend people in difficulties.

== Notable residents ==
- Proculus (died 281), Roman usurper
- Saint Martin of Tours (316–397), who has spent four years of hermit life in the island Gallinara
- Saint Veranus of Cavaillon (515–590), the remains are venerated in Cathedral of St. Michael Archangel
- Madame de Genlis (1746–1830), she came from Lusignano (Albenga hamlet) and she wrote Adèle et Théodore
- Gianmario Roveraro (1936–2006), banker founder of Banca Akros and former athlete. He was first Italian athlete to exceed 2 m in high jump.. Roveraro participated in Games of the XVI Olympiad in Melbourne
- Renato Curcio (1941), Former terrorist, publisher writer Italian writer, he is one of the founders of Red Brigades
- Giampiero Ventura (1948), Professional football manager, Ventura used to be football manager of the Italian national team of football. He has started his career like football manager with the Albenga Football.
- Ezio Madonia (1966), athlete sprinter, he has participated in the Games of the XXIV Olympiad in Seoul in 1988 and the Games of the XXVI Olympiad in Atlanta in 1996

== Transport and Infrastructure ==
=== Roads ===
Albenga is crossed by Via Aurelia, which connects Rome to France. This road used to pass through the city center alongside the old town of Albenga. In 1960 was built an alternative road which has made possible to move all traffic outside from Albenga. The city is crossed by main road, built over the past centuries, which connects with the close Piedmont region. For this reason is called as Piedmont road.

There are five roads in the world named Albenga: four are in Florida in the United States and one in Australia. The Florida ones are: Albenga Avenue Coral Gables; Albenga Road Northwest to Palm Bay; Southwest Albenga Avenue Port Saint Lucie; and Albenga Lane in North Port. The Australian example is Albenga Place, Secret Harbor, Western Australia.

=== Highway ===
Albenga is accessible via the A10 motorway. Since 1969 has started the process regarding the project for a road that can unite the plain directly and quickly with the Val Bormida, which it will be able to link directly Albenga to the Piedmont region, going straight to France and to Northern Europe. This project is called the Predosa-Albenga motorway; in 2010 has been kicked off for the final design.

=== Railway ===
Albenga has its own railway station, located on the line Genoa-Ventimiglia. The station has been opened in 1872, but the existing train station was rebuilt by architect Roberto Narducci in 1930.

The existing railway system has got one single track. In the new project regarding the new railway system, it will across the countryside instead of the existing one which is crossing the coast. The new railway system will be replaced by a new double track line. According with the new railway system the train station will be in the hamlet of Bastia.

=== Airport ===
In the close village of Villanova d'Albenga there is the Airport International "C. Panero", which has opened in 1922. Into the airport there is also the garrison of the 15 º Helicopters unit of Carabinieri (Italian gendarmerie). The nearest passenger airports are Genoa Cristoforo Colombo Airport, located 86 km (53 mi) north east, Nice Côte d'Azur Airport, located 120 km (75 mi) south west and Turin Airport, located 209 km (130 mi) north of Albenga.

== Twin towns ==
- Dabas, Hungary (2004)

== Bibliography ==
- Balzaretti, Ross (2013). Dark Age Liguria: Regional Identity and Local Power c. 400-1020. Studies in early medieval history. London: Bloomsbury. ISBN 978-1-78093-030-5.
