= Lusignano =

- Frazione
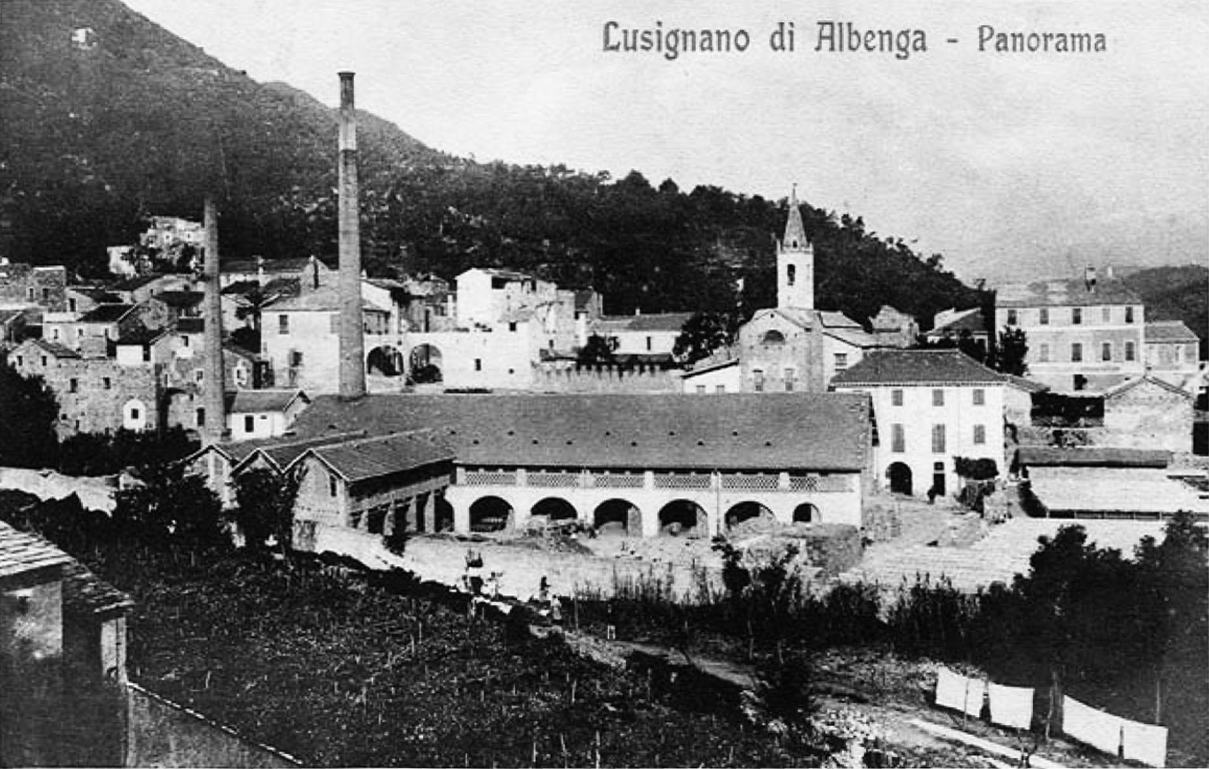
- Old postcard of Lusignano

- Location of Lusignano in Italy
- Coordinates: 44°02′49″N 8°10′19″E
- Country: Italy
- Region: Liguria
- Province: Savona
- Comune: Albenga
- Elevation: 20 m (66 ft)

Population
  - Total: 900
- Time zone: UTC+1 (CET)
  - Summer (DST): UTC+2 (CEST)
- Postal code: 17031
- Patron saint: Margaret the Virgin

Lusignano (or Lüxignan in Ligurian) is a hamlet in the municipality of Albenga, in the province of Savona, Italy. It is located about 4 km from the town of Albenga in a narrow strip of plain between the river Centa and the foothills bordering the plain to the south. The mountains are called the rock of pistulè. The name derives from the fundi rustic as Antognano, Aregliano, Velirano, Verano, all large-scale and exploiting the fertile plain.

The country is crossed by a river named Rio Carpaneto. The town developed along the ridge with a rather complex system, likely evidence of a more ancient origin than the other city of the plain.

During the excavations for the construction of a new residential complex in the region of in Rusineo, there were the ruins of a Roman villa of considerable size, which indicates a Roman presence in the area.

== Geography ==
Lusignano is in the first hinterland of Albenga, in the west Riviera. Its historical part is on the hills, including the parts of the expansion, to broaden the town boasts the surrounding plan. At the end of the 20th century there was an expansion of cottages in the surrounding area. However, the significant part coincides with the historical part, that is developed with a main street, Via Enrico D'Aste. It starting from the bottom tapering through the village, on its way this is different squares, also of limited size. The upper part of the route has been subject to redevelopment in 2011 with a project and funds from the Region of Liguria. The character is a village built on sloping ground, in the valley of the Rio Carpaneto. The landmark of the country is definitely the bell, even if it is dominated by the presence of the nearby Mount Pisciavino.

== History ==
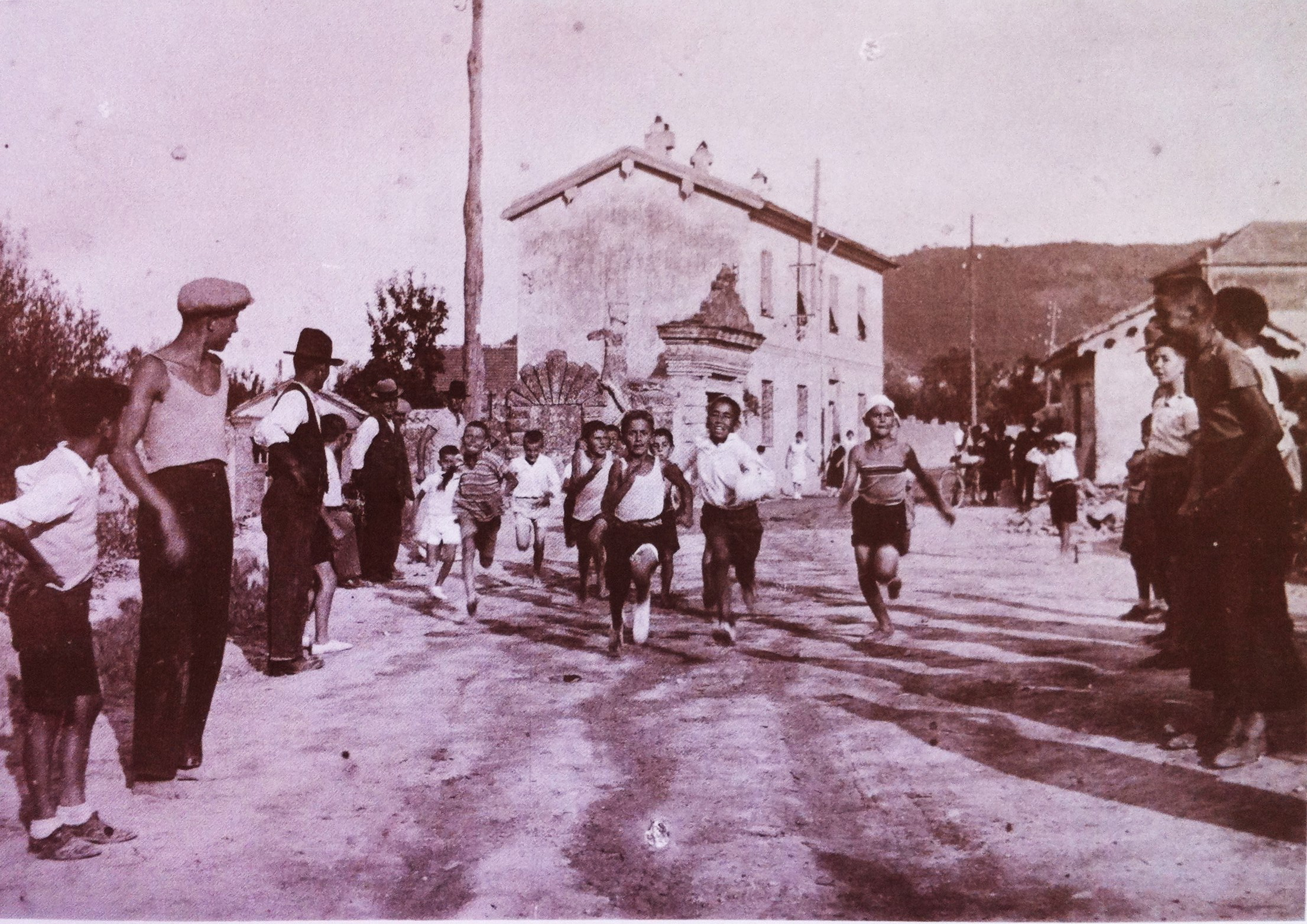
Children than play in the day after Saint Bartholomew that was known as sanbartumelin

The first settlements found date back to Roman times, but it is possible that Lusignano was one of the areas where the first inhabitants of the plain had settled: the slightly raised ground allows a safe shelter from the floods of the Centa river that crosses the Albenga plain; all this suggests that even in pre-Roman times the area was already inhabited or at least frequented.

With the end of the Roman era, even if without evidence, it is quite probable that the Lusignano area also developed. It is certain that the church dates back to before the 13th century, since the parish church, dedicated to Santa Margherita d'Antiochia, has a baptismal font and the presbytery from that historical period inside. In the book of the confreres of the local Confraternity of San Bartolomeo Apostolo, the first members date back to the 15th century, even if it is written that not all the confreres are present. In the Statutes of Albenga of 1288 there are various references to the town, which is called Luxignanum.

It is said that with a decree of 13 January 1313, the archdeacon of the cathedral had the prebend of S. Maria di Lusignano; it is not clear whether it was referring to some church or convent that is now lost, or if it was a spelling mistake and referring to the church of Santa Margherita.

Towards the middle of the fourteenth century there is certain information that Lusignano, together with San Fedele, Villanova, Ligo, Marta and Bossoleto were administratively under the control of the San Siro district of the city of Albenga, its laws and its magistrates. In 1418, among others, a certain Emmanuele Riva di Lusignano was chosen to represent the City of Albenga to the Doge of Genoa. In the period that goes from the fifteenth century to the nineteenth century, some villas were built, such as the one "del Vescovo"; in particular we have news from the text by Gio Ambrogio Paneri, Description of the city and countryside of Albenga, published in 1625 where he indicates Lusignano as a place of otium (transl. of idleness), describing it as a very delightful villa, where there are many houses and beautiful gardens of citizens, among which the pride of the former Prospero Cepolla, which now belongs to Gio Francesco de lords Counts Della Lengueglia. In these years there was the division of the hamlets under the aegis of the lords of the city, where Lusignano was under the Cepolla.

In 1615 the notary Enrico Riva left his inheritance to make a dowry to all the spinsters of Lusignano. In 1680 we have the news that this Bonifacio Bamonte, canon of the cathedral and rector of the church of Lusignano who was accused of committing acts of filth and crimes, for which he had to intervene with an absolute, Pope Clement XII.

When Napoleon stayed in Albenga in 1796, he plundered all the communities, including that of Lusignano which saw many of its treasures disappear: some sacred objects and the statue of San Bartolomeo were saved. The chests and related processional statues are from the mid-nineteenth century, moreover the statue of Christ above the altar of the parish has been attributed to Anton Maria Maragliano or to his school.

When the whole community of Albenga passed in 1797 under the new government of the Ligurian Republic it formed a separate municipality from Albenga together with San Fedele, which will return under the Albenganian administrative body only with the annexation to the First French Empire in 1804.

=== Testimony of the 19th century ===
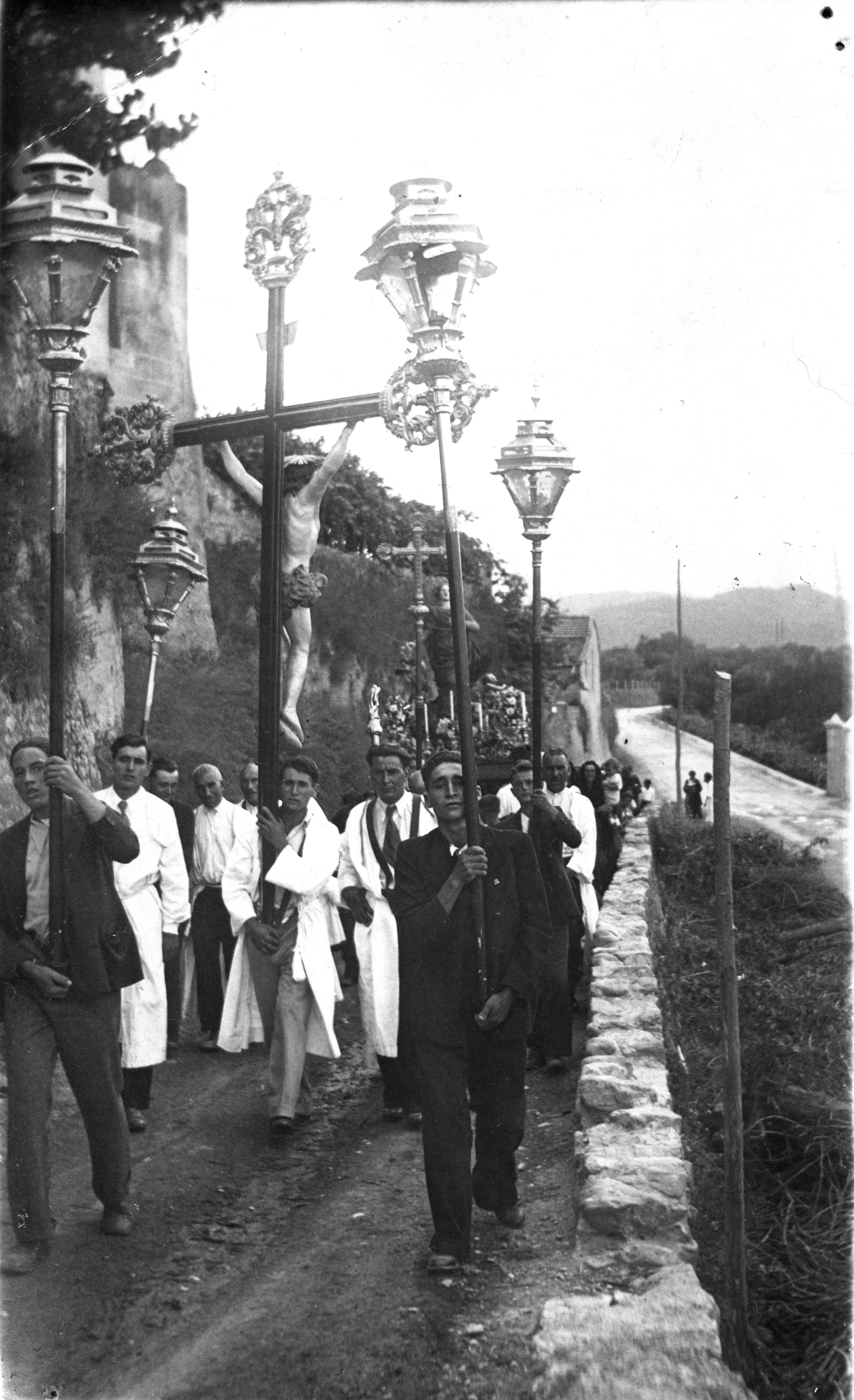
Procession of the early 1900s with the artistic crucifix of the Confraternity of Saint Bartholomew

The small town has the good fortune to host during the 19th century the comtesse de Genlis, writer and pedagogist, gifted with a liberal education, expounded her theory pedagogical in the treatise Adéle and Theodore , a novel written in Lusignano. It takes the aspect of the days she lives between here and nearby Albenga, she describes that the shepherdesses used to adorn their hair with flowers picked from the field and even if humble they are very elegant in their bearing.

=== Modern age ===
In the nineteenth century the Rolandi family lived in Lusignano, from which Vittorio Rolandi Ricci descended, probably born in their villa in the country in 1860. The town was spared from the great earthquake of 1887 which destroyed some of the ingaune towers and for this reason February 23, the anniversary of the earthquake, the town had a big party with a procession to thank San Bartolomeo for having saved the town. On February 2, 1880, Luisa Cepollini d'Alto and Caprauna was born in Lusignano, in the Villa Prospera owned by the Cepollini family; on Holy Thursday 1897 she received the call to the religious service then on April 9, 1900, she entered the Institute of Turin and on June 11 in Lyon for the novitiate. In September 1905 she made her perpetual vows with the name of Sister Giuseppina di Gesù she was a Sister of the Sacred Heart of Jesus. She died in Turin on June 21, 1917, and is buried in the chapel of the Institute. She has been subject to the process of beatification since 1966, with her appointment as a Servant of God.

During the World War I she made her great contribution to the victory of Italy, and during the second it was a country whose hills gave refuge to the partisans, who according to legends and findings deposited many of their armament in the abundant caves. During the war in the main square the Nazis carried out the death sentences of some partisans and civilians: on December 6, 1944, Giovanni Gitotta and Francesco De Paoli were shot in front of the Perseghini furnace. On January 31, 1945, Luciano Luberti, together with the former partisan Luciano Ghio and the German lieutenant Willy Angel, sacked the house and the stable of Andreino Bruno who was then killed by the hand of Luberti with Angel's gun.

Lusignano and San Fedele were the link between the city of Albenga and the mountain fighters. For this reason, between November '44 and February '45 the localities were subjected to German interference. The German troops occupied Lusignano and Lieutenant Willy Angel led the group. The Germans occupied several places, such as the Oratory of San Bartolomeo or private homes.

==== The events of December 13, 1944 ====
When the sun had not yet risen, on the morning of December 13, 1944, a search of all the houses in the town was carried out by German soldiers, who finding nothing forced the entire population to gather in the central square, including women and children. Here they separated the men from women and children, leaving the entire population under the gunfire for a period of time, shouting at those who moved too much. Luciano Luberti, who commanded the troops together with the German lieutenant commander, was present and interrogated. Given the rain that had come out, the priest, Don Remoino, opened the doors of the parish church and the military allowed the women and children to take shelter.

Towards the end of the morning the children and women were allowed to return home, while the men were forced to remain in the square until the roundups were over. However, shortly afterwards, two men tried to escape, one was chased through the streets of the town, captured and shot on the spot after a few meters, the other tried to escape through the Perseghini furnace, but found himself facing a wall too high to be bypassed, and he too was shot on the spot. These two people helped the partisans, but they were not part of it.

Much worse could have gone: in that morning some guns were to be transferred which were hidden among the wood of the countryside to be taken to the mountains, this operation would have had to be carried out by two partisans, Tullio called "Volpe" and Manfro called "Cornacchia ". However, Tullio's delay allowed Manfro to be warned of the presence of the Nazis in the town, and to postpone the operation; some periods later Manfro was arrested and tortured by the "executioner" Luciano Luberti. For the roundups of Lusignano and San Fedele Mauro Sansoni was arrested and taken to Savona, who was then shot on April 28 in the Priamar fortress.

==== Andreino Bruno ====
On the night of December 29, the German army collaborator Bruno Camilletti, while his wife Amelia Brocco was on guard, placed a musket and several ammunition in the Bruno family's henhouse, some of which scattered on the ground. The following morning he reported the young Andreino Giulio Bruno, born in 1926, to the Germans. At 19.30 on the 30th about thirty soldiers surrounded the house commanded by lieutenant Hangel, the Camillettis went to the chicken coop without fail, taking what was hidden the day before, giving proof of the guilt of the eighteen year old who was arrested; the spouses themselves wore the German uniform. The Cammillettis wanted to take revenge for a complaint received some time before for a theft of grapes. The young man was beaten and tortured all night. The next day at 9 in the morning the young Andreino Bruno was taken to the Inferno Region, in nearby San Fedele and killed with a gunshot to the back of the head. Luciano Luberti kicked his body by breaking some limbs to make him enter the pit in the ground which was too small. As usual, the Bruno house was sacked by the Germans, gold, silver, linen, animals and clothes. The linen was found at Brocco's house in Laigueglia after the war.

The story was told on the evening of April 24, 1945, in the home of Candido Stien and his wife Maddalena Amoi in San Fedele, where a German soldier, Felix, who was in retreat, confided in the weight that oppressed him, telling what had happened, also calling his mother by the young man, Luigia Sardo Bruno. She herself was tortured and slapped by the black Brigadier Felice Bisterzo; but Felix recounted Brocco's faults, whom she also said was one of Lieutenant Angel's mistresses. The German soldier was killed the next day in a clash with the partisans during the retreat from Albenga.

Candido Stien and Maddalena Amori will testify in Savona on May 28, 1945, in the trial against Amelia Brocco, who had fled to Montagnana in her hometown. While Camilletti was perhaps seized by remorse or perhaps for fear of what could happen to him, he tried suicide, while he was hospitalized he was taken and executed by the partisans after a quick trial on May 7, 1945. They were found guilty of collaborationism, having denounced and directly procured the deaths of Andreino Bruno and Pasquale Faroppa, the Military Information Service had evidence of their collaborationism and of the fact that they often wore Nazi uniforms as pride.

=== Today ===
The structure and urban planning of the town remained unchanged, or at most with few changes, for many centuries, preserving in its inhabitants a spirit that dates back to the Middle Ages, linked to the land and moral values. From the 1960s, the Perseghini furnace was closed and abandoned, becoming a refuge for the homeless for a period. Only in the 1990s did the country begin to expand.

On the night of July 28, 1991, the carabiniere Germano Giovanni Bonello, free from duty, saved the occupants of a car that he had crashed before the tank exploded. For this reason, the President of the Republic, by decree dated April 30, 1992, recognizes the silver medal for civil valor for the carabiniere, as a shining example of uncommon daring and a high sense of duty.

== Monuments and places of interest ==
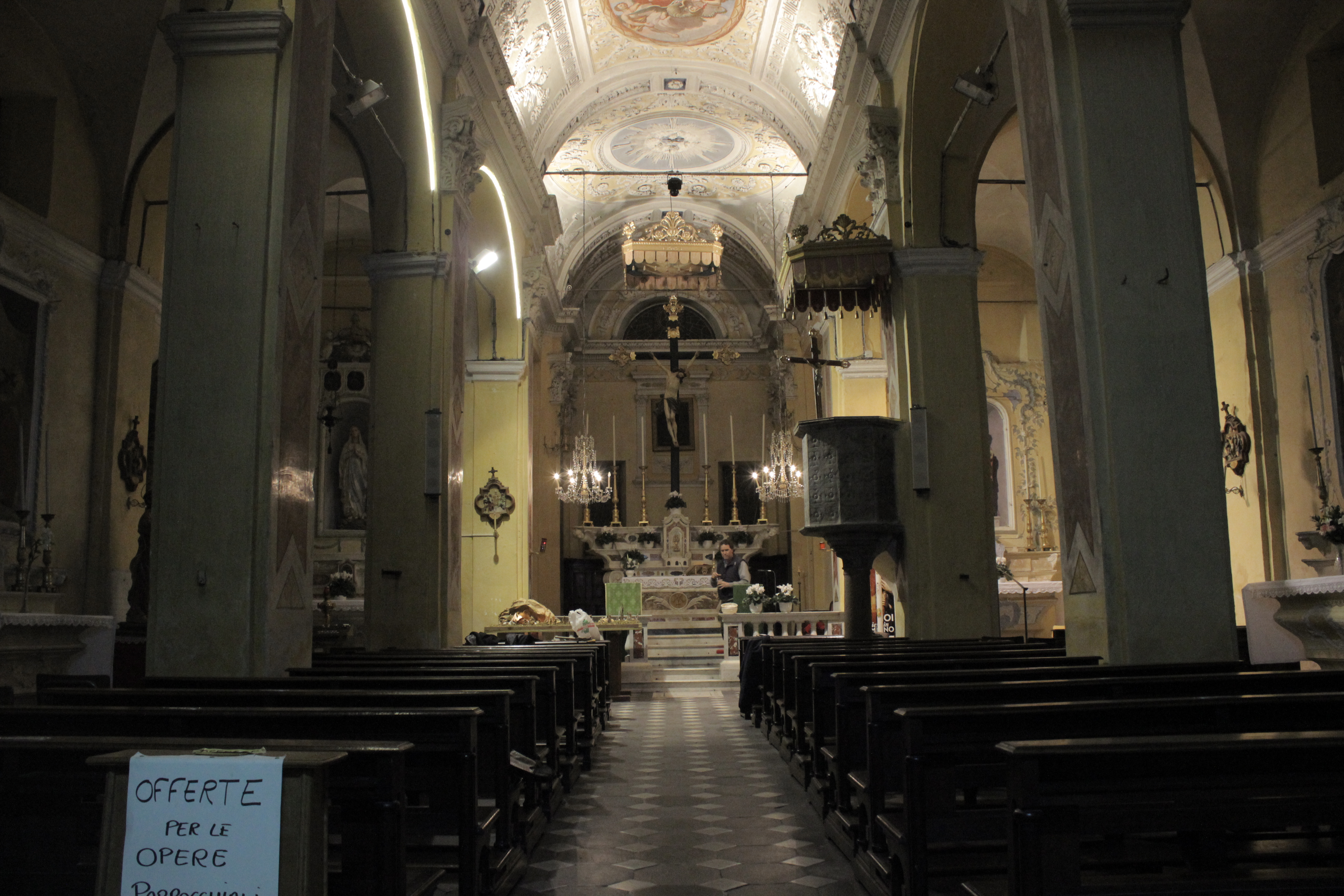
Interior of the church of Saint Margaret the Virgin

=== Religious architectures ===
==== Church of Saint Margaret the Virgin ====
The parish church of the village is dedicated to Saint Margaret, know ad Santa Margherita in italian. In 1402, Pope Boniface IV delegated the benefit of Santa Margherita of Lusignano to Antonio Sismondi, known as "de Ponte". On 9 February 1430 the church received a new priest for the care of souls, it was the last act of the two vicars of the provisional government of the diocese, the day after he took office to Albenga the new bishop Matteo Del Carretto. The baptistery arrived under the bishop's care of Napoleone Fieschi on 14 October 1460, with the obligation of 10 soldi to be paid to the archpriest; this permit will later be withdrawn without explanation.

He was appointed to the parish title thanks to Monsignor Giacomo Gambarana, who grants the baptismal font to the rector on June 1, 1523, always with the obligation to pay 10 soldi a year to the archpriest of cathedral ingauna, with the obligation to serve in the cathedral on Holy Saturday, on the eve of Pentecost, and on the feast of the patron saint Archangel Michael. From 1598 the patronal church was submitted to the patronage of the Albenganese Cepolla family. In 1629 – 1630 the inhabitants decided to enlarge the parish church with a "majestic choro at noon". The low façade was divided vertically into three parts and the bell tower from the 16th century was preserved. Expanded in the following centuries, with a major modification in Baroque age, the ceiling is decorated with a bas-relief that should have ended with gold beads in the part near the altar, a symbol that for a war or for a famine could not finish the work.

Inside there are the processional statues of Bartholomew the Apostle and Margaret the Virgin made by Antonio Brilla in the mid 19th century. There is a statue of Saint Bartholomew from the 16th century. Inside the church there are 4 paintings and a cycle of paintings of the Stations of the Cross. The church has a Latin plan with 3 naves with a high altar of which the choir is behind. The facade was restored in the 1990s.

==== Oratory of Saint Bartholomew the Apostle ====
In the hamlet there is the Oratory of Saint Bartholomew the Apostle, seat of the homonymous brotherhood. The present oratory derives from a reconstruction which took place around 1780, following the collapse of the previous structure.

=== Civil architectures ===
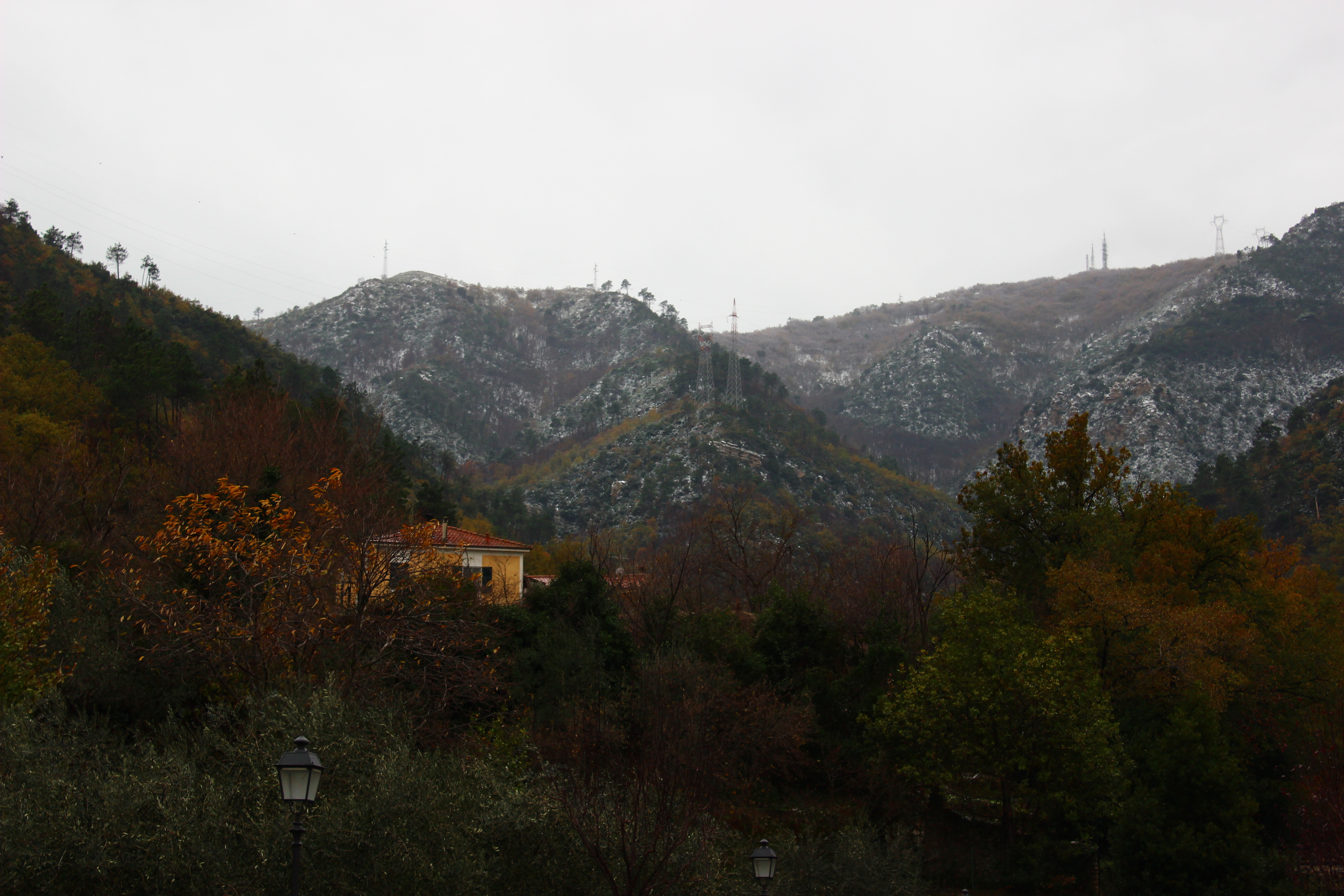
Snow-covered glimpse of Lusignano

==== Villa of the bishop ====
In the village there is a villa of the bishop of Albenga Pier Francesco Costa, who since 1647 spent much of his time on site, deciding to leave this villa to the seminary and to spend his last days there. It was rebuilt by Monsignor Carlo Maria Giuseppe de Fornari in the years 1726–1727, at an expense of 400 lire, enlarged by the bishop Stefano Giustiniani in the years 1786–1789, the bishop Angelo Vincenzo Andrea Maria Dania died on September 9, 1818. During the campaign of Italy Napoleon Bonaparte took possession of the villa, but thanks to a personal acquaintance with the bishop Dania, who had been a schoolmate of the young general, he was able to obtain protection.

During the war of succession, the Albenga seminary was occupied by 1200 soldiers under the guidance of the city commissioner Emanuele Ricci; the seminary was transferred for a short period to the villa of Lusignano. In 1820 the new bishop of Albenga – Carmelo Cordiviola – with the excuse of the unhealthy air (perhaps due to the recent construction of the Perseghini furnace, very close to the villa) which had settled in Lusignano, asked and obtained from the government to have access to a large and abandoned convent in Alassio where another seminary opened, capable of hosting all the clerics even in the autumn months.

With the unification of Italy, the Church saw many of its assets removed and even the villa of Lusignano, during the episcopal administration of Pietro Anacleto Siboni, risked a change of ownership which was averted in 1867 thanks to the help of the lawyer Giuseppe Leone Mantica. In 1921 it was sold by Bishop Angelo Cambiaso who bought the Verzi-Loano paper mill with the proceeds; however, during the Second World War it functioned for some time as a seminary even in winter.

==== Roman country villa ====
The archaeological site was discovered in 1995, during the works for the group of buildings of Rusineo, along the piedmont strip, which limits towards south the flat ground of Albenga, between the outlying wards of Lusignano and Barbano. The archaeological area goes towards east-west on a hillock, raised by about ten meters as to the flat ground; here it is possible to recognize the remains of a farm or of the pars rustica of a villa. The area overlooks Albenga and the sea and it is safe from the violent floods of Arroscia river, but near a small river: it is a perfect location, fully in accordance with the prescriptions suggested by the antique sources for a villa perfecta. The north, south and west sides of a large rectangular yard are partially kept; the yard is 24 meters wide, formed by brickworks in concrete, covered with stones with irregular shapes. The east side of the yard, as well as the brickworks which were in the west side of the yard itself, have been fully removed over the time, probably when, in recent times, the area has been terraced with agricultural aims and wide earth movings have been carried out. On the north side of the yard, there are four adjoining spaces, with floor made of ground, used perhaps in the past as service areas, or as shelter for the tools. The southern part of the yard, today covered, is, on the contrary, fully occupied by one area only, rather narrow and elongated, interpretable as a stable. Some tiles, cemented along the wall limiting the inner side of the yard, slightly sloping towards the external, seem actually canalizations for the discharge of sewage, while in the near small basin, whose bottom covered with mortar and pottery fragments is still kept, it is possible to see a drinking trough. The archaeological stratigraphy allows to distinguish a continuity of life of the site, from its building, about at the beginning of the 1st century AD until the 5th century. The whole archaeological area is now under protection according to the Ministerial Decree November 6, 1995, and July 7, 1997.

==== Villa Prospera ====
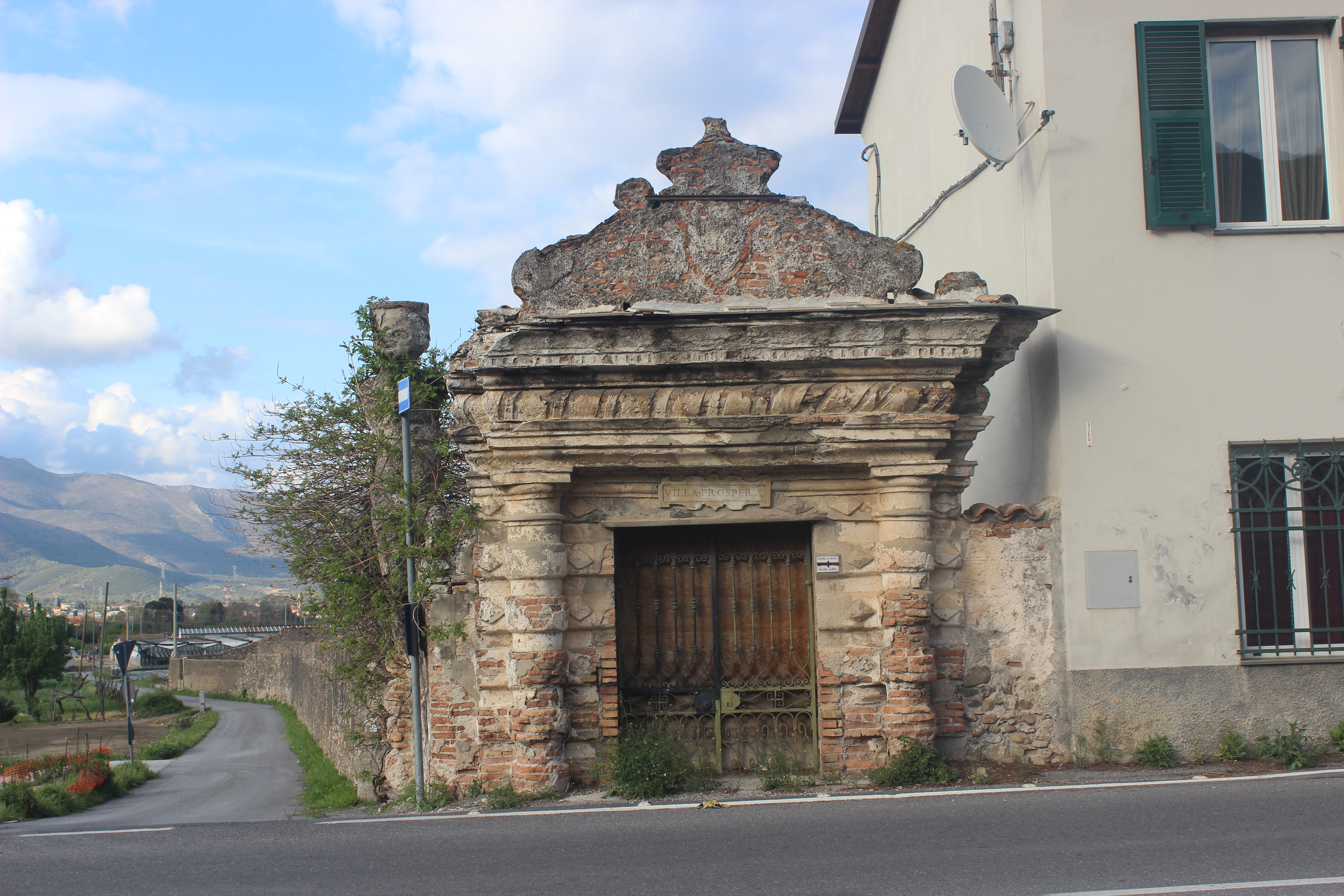
Villas Prospera

Along the road to the city, the most unique of the villas on the plain is Villa Prospera, formerly Villa Cepolla, with an interesting grotesque portal in ashlar rode by Omu Grossu (in english big men), a great anthropomorphic figure who still manages to arouse all the amazement of baroque art. Well documented since 1604, the artifact has at its entrance a bizarre and grotesque female figure seated astride the walls, with her head turned to the manor house. The inscription recalls the name of the customer of the work, the collector of antiquities Prospero Cepolla , born in Palermo in 1543, who wanted to give monumental forms to his father's land starting in 1550 and continued until 1594 described with the words: The result was a residential complex consisting of “a villa surrounded by a wall with a house inside and an adjoining lawn and vineyard named the Garzeo located in the place of Lusignano.

Popular legend has it that a bandit was running away from the carabinieri, and while he was on the wall, he was killed. The wall marked the border between the territories belonging to the bishop and those belonging to the marquis. The anthropomorphic monument was erected to remind future generations of this event. The symbol was taken as an image by the local Lusignanese mutual aid sports union. With the death of the last heir Prospero Cepollini (lawyer, mayor of Albenga and President of the Province of Savona), which took place in 1972, the property passed to the Sisters of the Sacred Heart of Jesus of Turin, where two aunts, including the Servant of God Maria Giuseppina of Jesus, they did service. Then the property was sold to private individuals.

==== Perseghini furnace ====
The Perseghini family built two brick kilns in Lusignano and Albenga, buying a lime factory in Finalmarina. On the death of Gaspare Perseghini in 1925, he left the company in the hands of his sons Eugenio and Giuseppe. Since then began the climb to the top of the local economy. The furnace of Lusignano was officially opened in 1810 making the furnace, with the operation of the Hoffmann furnace method, one of the first examples in Italy.

After the Second World War the new furnace arrived in Villanova d'Albenga and the business flourished thanks to the reconstruction. In 1958 Eugenio died. In the mid-seventies, the rapid decline began: continuous cycle productions, plastic materials and iron replaced brick.

In 1997, the Fornace begins a new life thanks to a building renovation that transforms it into a residential complex, with shapes very similar to those of the past. Some associations criticize the project, arguing that it was not a real recovery, but the destruction of the shapes that the furnace once had. However, the ovens and a part of the chimney have been preserved which constitute a real "industrial monument" of a bygone era. The furnace construction site is still open, a series of abuses and discrepancies made by the site managers have been reported, including an increase in the cubic capacity of a few thousand cubic meters and the illegal construction in the adjacent Rio Carpaneto.

The registers of economic activities are still preserved, reflecting the strong activity of the factory.

==== The cemetery ====
In 1832 the Senatorial Manifesto was issued by the King, according to which the dead would no longer be able to bury themselves in churches or villages for health reasons; a land is chosen for the burial outside the built-up area. A land above the Borgo owned by Pietro della Pietra was chosen for 30 Lire and an area of 130 square meters; Count Cepollini opposes and wins the dispute because the land did not reflect when desired by the Royal Patents. The Commission finds what the Count said untrue, but to avoid quarrels it prefers to find another place, and in 1833 there is a plot of land in the Molino Region, owned by Dorotea Rolando, wife of Filippo Enrico, of 225 square meters, used for viticulture and paid 52 cents per square meter.

== See also ==
- Albenga
- San Fedele, Albenga

== Bibliography ==
- Lamboglia Nino, Albenga romana e medioevale, Ist. Inter. Studi Liguri, Bordighera 1966
- Costa Restagno Josepha, Albenga, Sagep Editrice,1985
- Romano Strizioli, Sebastiano Gandolfo, Erica Marzo, Albenga: un secolo di storia (1900–2000), F.lli Stalla di Albenga, Albenga, 2007, ISBN 978-88-901943-7-5
- Pierpaolo Rivello, Le stragi nell'albenganese del 1944 e 1945, Torino, Sottosopra edizioni, 2011.
- Ferruccio Iebole e Pino Fragalà, Lo chiamavano Cimitero, Albenga, Scripsi, tracce d'autore, 2020.
