= Diocese of Albenga–Imperia =

Roman Catholic diocese in Italy

Diocese of Albenga–Imperia Dioecesis Albinganensis–Imperiae

Catholic
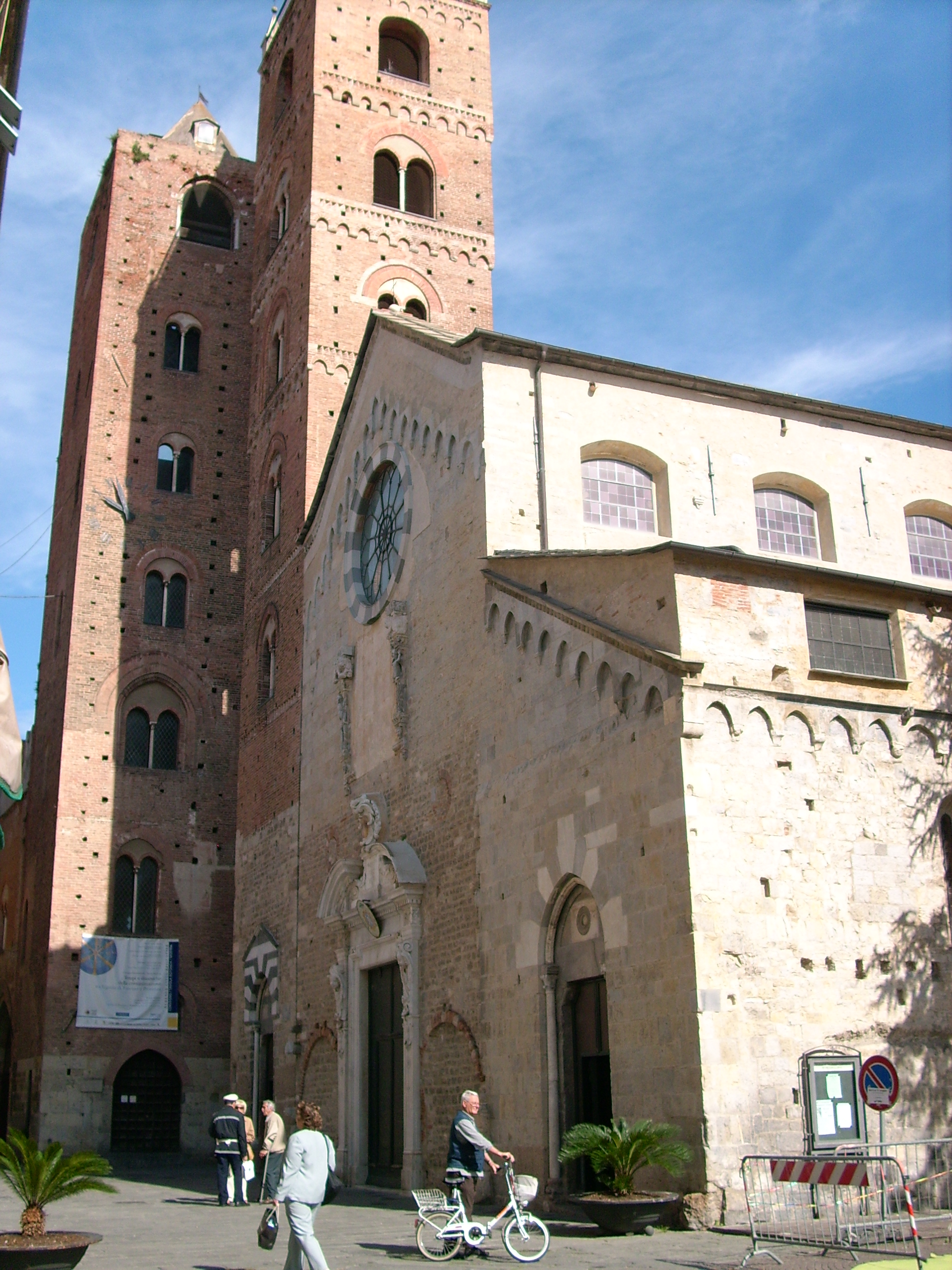
- Albenga Cathedral

Location
- Country: Italy
- Ecclesiastical province: Genoa
- Headquarters: n/a

Statistics
- Area: 979 km^{2} (378 sq mi)
- Population: Total; Catholics: (as of 2015); 171,500 (est.); 158,400 (est.) (92.4%)
- Parishes: 162

Information
- Denomination: Catholic Church
- Rite: Roman Rite
- Established: 5th Century
- Cathedral: Cattedrale di S. Michele Arcangelo (Albenga)
- Co-cathedral: Basilica Concattedrale di S. Maurizio e Compagni Martiri (Porto Maurizio)
- Secular priests: 135 (diocesan); 47 (Religious Orders); 21 Permanent Deacons

Current leadership
- Pope: Leo XIV
- Bishop: Guglielmo Borghetti

Map
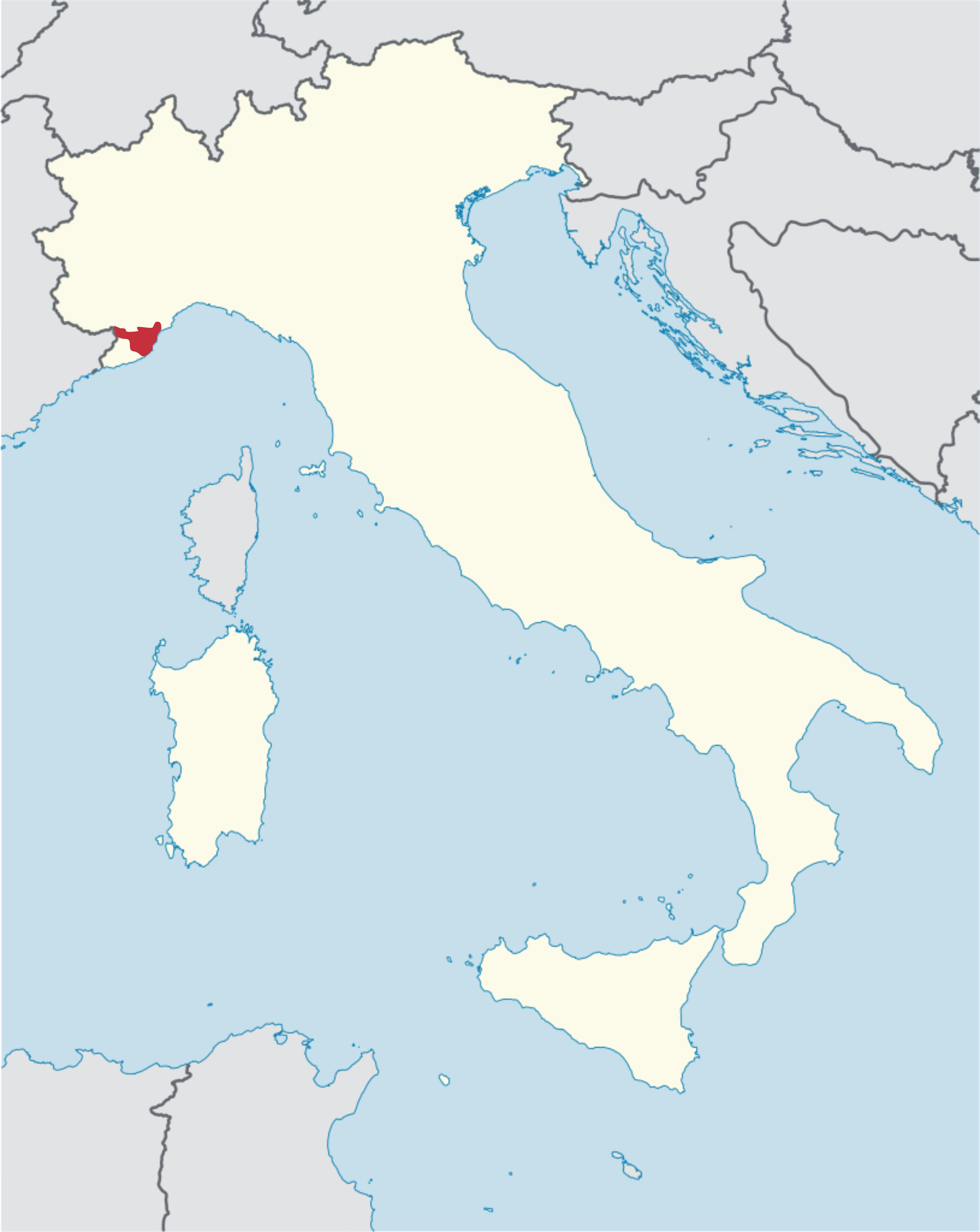

Website
- Website of the diocese (in Italian)

The Diocese of Albenga–Imperia (Latin: Dioecesis Albinganensis–Imperiae) is a Latin diocese of the Catholic Church in Liguria, northern Italy; the traditional name of the Diocese of Albenga was changed by decree of the Congregation of Bishops in the Roman Curia, with the approval of Pope Paul VI, on 1 December 1973. It is a suffragan of the Archdiocese of Genoa.

== History ==
Legend makes Albenga the scene of the martyrdom of Calocerus of Brescia (Calogero), an officer of the court of Hadrian, between the years 121 and 125. But the Acts of his martyrdom, together with those of Faustinus and Jovita with which they are incorporated, have no historical foundation. Nor does their martyrdom imply the existence of a bishopric or a bishop.

In 451, a signature from a bishop of Albenga named Quintus appears on the Synodal Letter of Eusebius, Bishop of Milan, to Pope Leo I, in which the condemnation of Nestorius and Eutyches was sanctioned.

In the medieval period, the bishop of Albenga was lord of the principality of Oneille and of Pietra and its dependencies. He was therefore a feudal subject of the Emperor.

=== The Barbarossa crisis ===
At the end of January 1159 the Emperor Frederick seized the city of Crema, which was in league with Milan, and destroyed it. The feudal lords of Albenga paid homage to the Emperor. The Emperor granted the city of Albenga its freedom, and took it under his protection. In the previous year Genoa had seized the territory of Ventimiglia, and Albenga had found itself trapped in a vise.

With the papal election of September 1159 a period of turmoil struck the Church and the diocese of Albenga. Two factions of cardinals elected two popes. The majority chose Pope Alexander III, while the minority, supported by the Emperor Frederick Barbarossa, chose Victor IV. In a letter of 26 September 1159 from his refuge in Terracina, Pope Alexander wrote to Archbishop Syrus of Genoa and his suffragans his own version of what had happened. On 13 December he wrote again to bishops in northern Italy, including those of Liguria, telling them that Victor had had himself crowned pope. On 13 February 1160, Victor held a general council at Pavia, with the participation of the Emperor. The legate of Alexander III, Cardinal Iohannes de' Conti di Segni, was sent north to the Po Valley, where, on 27 February 1160, he excommunicated Ubertus of Milan. In 1161 Frederick captured and destroyed the city of Milan. In May and June 1161, Victor and the Emperor held another council, at Cremona, at which Victor deposed Ubertus, the Archbishop of Milan, Hugo of Piacenza, Raimundus of Brescia, and Gerardus of Bologna. Driven from Rome by Imperial troops immediately after his election, Alexander III sought refuge in Genoa on 21 January 1162, where he stayed until his departure for France on 25 April. During his stay in Genoa, Pope Alexander addressed the problem of Milan and Albenga, and a number of other dioceses in Liguria, Piedmont, and Lombardy. Milan, for a time, had ceased to exist, both civilly and ecclesiastically. Albenga had no Metropolitan.

On 25 March 1162, therefore, Pope Alexander issued the bull Superna et ineffabilis. He confirmed the metropolitanate of Genoa, with its suffragan bishops of Mariana, Nebbio, and Accia (on Sardinia); Bobbio, and Brugnato, and ordered that the archbishop should be consecrated by his suffragans. He also granted the archbishop a legateship over the island of Sardinia, to be exercised every eight years in association with a Roman cardinal. The Pope then granted (concessit) to the archbishop of Genoa and his successors the monastery on the island of Gallinaria (just offshore Albenga), which had up to that point belonged directly to the Holy See. He also transferred the parishes of Porto Veneris and its neighborhood (a port of the Genoese fleet) from the diocese of Luni (which was under the control of the Emperor) to the archbishop of Genoa. Then the Pope granted (concessit) the diocese of Albenga to the Archbishop of Genoa and his successors. Two points must be noted. The grant is conditional; it is to take effect 'within the two-year period after peace shall have been restored to the church'. Secondly, Albenga is not said to have been made a suffragan of Genoa. If the peace referred to is the end of the schism, that did not take place until 1178 or 1180.

In 1165 Albenga was allied with Pisa, the principal naval supporters of the Emperor Frederick and the principal enemy of Genoa. But in that year, seeing the opportunity to harm Genoa, Pisa attempted to seize Albenga. On 22 August the Pisan navy attacked with 31 galleys, and the city was captured. It was put to the torch and destroyed.

Bishop Lanterius (Lauterius) is still listed as belonging to the ecclesiastical province of Milan at the III Lateran Council in March 1179.

=== Innocent III and Albenga ===
In 1208 scandal enveloped the diocese of Albenga. Complaints to the papacy were of sufficient gravity that Pope Innocent III appointed a committee of Apostolic Visitors. Bishop Oberto of Albenga was accused of employing the use of the red-hot iron as a method of purging an accused person of the guilt of his crime, and over the strong objections of the people. Oberto was suspended from episcopal authority by the Visitors, and ordered to present himself at the Papal Court to explain his conduct, which he never did. In fact, when the Archbishop of Vercelli appeared and explained the whole matter to the Pope, Bishop Oberto disappeared, and a diligent search was unable to locate him. Pope Innocent then took counsel with his advisors, and Oberto was judged unworthy of the ministry of the altar (ministerio altaris indignum). Then the Pope wrote a letter to Bisho-elect Sessa, ordering him and the Archbishop of Vercelli to use the powers granted to them when they were named Apostolic Visitors to depose Bishop Oberto. They were also ordered to see to it that a suitable person be found to be canonically elected in his place. Bishop Oberto, however, returned to the Papal Court, and engaged in a series of delaying tactics, offering one excuse after another, which were contrary to the information in the committee report, and promising that he would prove his statements at an appropriate time (opportuno tempore). In a letter of 1 October 1210, Pope Innocent ordered Sessa to investigate Oberto's new excuses, and if they were proved to be true, to absolve him and restore him to office; if they were false, he was to proceed as previously directed by the Pope and arrange for a new election.

In the summer of 1213, Pope Innocent decided to deal with the fifty-year-long scandal of the defiance of papal bulls by the bishops of Albenga, with regard to the assignment of Albenga to the ecclesiastical province of Genoa. The moment may have been chosen because a new bishop had just been elected, and was awaiting confirmation by the Pope. The See of Milan was also vacant. On 8 July 1213, Innocent addressed a mandate to the Abbot of Tileto, to warn the Albengans and to get them, by ecclesiastical censures without right of appeal, to render obedience and reverence to the Archbishop of Genoa as their Metropolitan.

On 19 December 1213, Archbishop Otto of Genoa took formal possession of the diocese of Albenga, and on 24 December he was honorably received by the clergy and people of the diocese.

=== Cathedral and Chapter ===
The original cathedral of Albenga had once been a Roman temple; it was octagonal in form and dedicated to S. John the Evangelist. It was replaced by the second cathedral, after 1128; it was dedicated to S. Michael the Archangel. Bishop Luca Fieschi (1582–1610) carried out major repairs on the cathedral, and rebuilt the adjacent episcopal palace.

The Chapter of the Cathedral was composed of three dignities (the Archdeacon, the Archpriest, and the Provost) and fifteen Canons. There were also twelve chaplains. The Chapter itself was already in existence by 1076, when Bishop Deodatus gave a mansio in Toirano to the monastery of S. Pietro in Varatella, with the consent of the three dignities and eleven priests and deacons. In 1225 the Chapter of the Cathedral gave to the monastery of S. Stefano in Genoa the churches of S. Maurizio de Villaregia and S. Maria de Pompeiana in the diocese of Albenga. The third dignity, the Provost, was not created until 22 October 1482, by Bishop Leonardo Marchese (1476–1513).

In the early 19th century the Chapter was composed of eighteen Canons and ten Beneficiaries. It had an annual revenue of 5,000 French francs. The Cathedral itself had an income of 2,000 francs.

The Collegiate Church of Santa Maria in fontibus in the city of Albenga also had a Chapter, composed of a Provost and six Canons. There was also a Collegiate Church in Diano Castello, with a Chapter composed of a Provost and twelve Canons. The Collegiate Church of Oneglia had a Chapter composed of a Provost and eleven Canons. The Collegiate church of Pieve had a college of fourteen Canons. Porto Maurizio had a Collegiate Church, with a Chapter composed of a Provost and thirteen Canons. In 1840 a new Collegiate Church was founded in Alassio, with a Chapter consisting of a Provost and twelve Canons.

Bishop Carlo Cicada (1554–1572), who had taken part in the Council of Trent, established the diocesan seminary in 1568. Its quarters were transferred and enlarged in a building next to the old college of S. Lorenzo in 1622. Bishop Pietro Francesco Costa doubled the number of free places in the seminary, and increased the number of teachers. The seminary was ruined by the revolutionary wars of the Genoese and the French, but was restored through the care of Bishop Cordiviola.

The Collegiate Church of S. Siro in San Remo, administered by a college of Canons, had once belonged to the diocese of Albenga, but it was handed over to the diocese of Ventimiglia. It became the co-cathedral of the diocese of Albenga on 1 December 1973, by decree of the Sacred Congregation of Bishops in the Roman Curia.

=== Synods ===
A diocesan synod was an important meeting of the bishop of a diocese and his clergy, held irregularly at the call of the bishop. Its purpose was (1) to proclaim generally the various decrees already issued by the bishop; (2) to discuss and ratify measures on which the bishop chose to consult with his clergy; (3) to publish statutes and decrees of the diocesan synod, of the provincial synod, and of the Holy See.

On 1 June 1531, Bishop Giangiacomo Gambarana held a diocesan synod with his clergy in the sacristy of the Cathedral. Bishop Carlo Cicala presided over a synod in 1564. Another diocesan synod was held on 1 and 2 December 1583 by Bishop Luca Fieschi.

In 1613 Bishop Dominico Marini held a diocesan synod, whose Constitutions were published in 1902, along with those of the synod held by Filippo Allegro on 16–18 September 1902. In 1618 Bishop Vincenzo Landinelli (1616–1624) presided at a diocesan synod; he held another synod in 1623. On 1 December 1629, Bishop Pietro Francesco Costa held a diocesan synod, and another in 1638. Bishop Giovanni Tommaso Pinelli, C.R. (1666–1688) held a diocesan synod in the Cathedral on 7 and 8 June 1671. Bishop Giorgio Spinola presided at a synod in the Cathedral of Albenga on 8–10 October 1696. A diocesan synod was held in the Cathedral by Bishop Carmelo Cordiviola (1820–1827) on 26–28 October 1824.

=== Religious Orders in the diocese ===
There were Benedictine foundations at S. Romulo (a dependency of S. Stefano in Genoa), Taggia, Triora, and Villa Regia. In the city of Albenga was the monastery of S. Pietro di Toirano, and just off the harbor the monastery of S. Maria e S. Martino di Gallinaria, which was directly dependent on the Holy See.

By the mid-17th century, the diocese was host to the following religious orders: the Dominicans at Albenga, Diano Marina, Pietra, and in Toirano; the Conventual Franciscans in Albenga; the Observant Franciscans in Albenga, Diano Castello, Dolcedo, Porto Maurizio, and Triora; the Reformed Franciscans in Alassio, Pietra, S. Remo and Maro; the Capuchins in Alassio, Loano, Oneglia, Porto Maurezio, San Remo, and Pieve; the Augustinians in Cervo, Loano, Oneglia, Pontedassio, Pieve, and Triora; the Minims of S. Francesco di Paola in Albenga and Borghetto S. Spirito; the Discalced Carmelites in Loano; the Certosini in Toirano; and the Jesuits in San Remo and Alassio.

The Poor Clares had convents at Albenga, Alassio, and Porto Maurizio. The Blue Nuns (Turchine) had convents in San Remo and Pieve.

=== The French ===
In 1524 the army of King Francis I of France travelled through Albenga, on their way to claim the Duchy of Milan for the French King, despite treaty stipulations. The army spent twenty-five days in the city's territory. The Emperor Charles V organized an alliance of Italian cities and states, to defend Piedmont from the incursions of the French, and Albenga became a member of that league. In 1525 King Francis was defeated at the Battle of Pavia and taken prisoner. But for the next two centuries and more, the struggle continued over the possession of Liguria and the Piedmont.

From 1794 through 1796 the armies of the French Republic used the road through Albenga to enter Lombardy and the Po Valley in their war against the Austrians. The ideological fervor of the troops and their leaders stimulated local rebellions in Liguria against the governing aristocracy. In June 1797 a civil war broke out in Genoa, which, under the inspiration of General Napoleon Bonaparte, led to the establishment of the Ligurian Republic, of which Albenga became a member. The religious policies of the Ligurian Republic were those of the French Republic, with regard to the reorganization of religion as an organ of the State. In May 1800 the Austrian general Melas occupied Albenga and drove out the French garrison; but at the beginning of June French troops returned and reinstalled the Napoleonic republican regime.

Bishop Paolo Maggiolo (1791–1802) was forced by a violent mob to flee from his cathedral, finding refuge in the parish of Bardino Vecchio, where he died and was buried.

In 1806, all of Liguria was united by the Emperor Napoleon to the French Empire. In obedience to the edict of Napoleon I of 25 February 1810, and the demands of the French minister of cults in Paris, Bishop Dania ordered the teachers in the seminary to instruct their students in the Four Gallican Articles of 1682, and in 1811 he had the Articles printed by a press in Genoa.

In 1810, Bishop Angelo Dania issued a pastoral letter, in which he announced the suppression of all of the religious houses in the diocese of Albenga, in accordance with French laws.

On 14 February 1814, Pope Pius VII, having been released from his captivity by Napoleon at Fontainbleau, arrived at Albenga, while on his journey to Savona. He was received by Bishop Dania, the clergy, and the magistrates and people of Albenga, and conducted to the Cathedral for a thanksgiving service. He was then escorted to the Episcopal Palace, where he spent the night, before continuing on his journey.

Following the Congress of Vienna the duchy of Savoy was returned to the King of Sardinia, and he was made Doge of Genoa in addition. The bishop of Albenga was recognized by the King of Sardinia as a Prince of the Holy Roman Empire, even though it had been abolished in 1804.

Carmelo Cordiviola (1820–1827) had the unenviable task of restoring order and repairing the damage done by the French and their collaborator Bishop Dania. He was particularly shocked by the extent of the influence of Gallicanism and Jansenism, especially in the diocesan seminary. He took immediate action by removing the popular Rector, Canon Gianeri, who had twice been Vicar Capitular of the diocese, in 1802 and 1820. The bishop then held a pastoral visitation of the parishes in the diocese, and afterwards held a diocesan synod in 1824 to address the various ills of the faithful members of the diocese.

The Bishop of Albenga was granted possession of the Abbey of S. Maria e S. Martino dell' Isola Gallinaria and the title of Abbot by Pope Gregory XVI on 11 March 1845, on the nomination of the King of Sardinia; he also became Prior of S. Maria d'Arossia (Ponte-lungo). In 1866 Bishop Raffaele Biale sold the entire island on which the monastery of S. Maria e S. Martino was located to Signor Leonardi Gastaldi.

== Bishops ==
=== Diocese of Albenga ===
==== to 1400 ====
...

- Quintus (attested 451)

...

- Bonus (attested 679)

...

- Benedictus (c. 885)

...

- Erembertus (attested 1046)

...

- Deodatus (c. 1075–1098)
- Aldebertus (c. 1103–1124)
- Odo (Odoardo) (1125–1149)
- Robertus (attested 1159)
- Lanterius (c. 1175–c. 1179)
- Ainaldus (Airaldus) (attested 1191)
- Ibaldo Fieschi (1198–c. 1199)

Trucco (1199)

- Oberto (1205–1211)
- Enrico (c. 1211–c. 1213)
- Oberto (1216–1225)
- Sinibaldo Fieschi (1225–1226 Resigned)
- Simon (attested 1238)
- Imperialis Doria
- Lanterius
- Lanfrancus de Nigro, O.Min. (1255–1291)
- Nicolaus Faschino, O.Min. (1292–1306?)
- Emanuel Spinola (1309–1321)
- Joannes, O.Min. (1321–1328)

Fredericus Cibo (1328–1329) Administrator

- Fredericus de Ceva (1329–1350)
- Giovanni de Ceva (1350–1364)
- Giovanni Fieschi (1364–1390)
- Gilbertus Fieschi (1390–1419?)

==== 1400 to 1600 ====
- Antonio da Ponte (1419–1429)
- Matteo del Carretto (1429–1448)

Giorgio Fieschi (Flisco) (1448–1459 Resigned) Administrator
Napoleone Fieschi (1459–1466) Administrator

- Valerio Calderina (1466–1472)
- Girolamo Basso Della Rovere (1472–1476)
- Leonardo Marchesi (1476–1513 Died)
- Bandinello Sauli (1513–1517 Resigned) Administrator
- Giulio de' Medici (1517–1518 Resigned) Administrator
- Giangiacomo di Gambarana (1518–1538 Died)
- Girolamo Grimaldi (1538–1543 Died)
- Giovanni Battista Cicala (Cicada) (1543–1554)
- Carlo Cicala (Cicada) (1554–1572 Resigned)
- Carlo Grimaldi (1572–1581 Died)
- Orazio Malaspina (1582–1582 Died)
- Luca Fieschi (1582–1610 Died)

==== 1600 to 1900 ====
- Domenico de' Marini (1611–1616)
- Vincenzo Landinelli (1616–1624 Resigned)
- Pietro Francesco Costa (1624–1655)
- Francesco de' Marini (1655–1666)
- Giovanni Tommaso Pinelli, C.R. (1666–1688)
- Alberto Sebastiano Botti (Blotto), O. Carm. (1689–1690 Died)
- Giorgio Spinola (1691–1714)
- Carlo Maria Giuseppe Fornari (1715–1730 Resigned)
- Agostino Rivarola (1730–1745 Died)
- Costantino Serra, C.R.S. (1746–1763 Died)
- Giuseppe Francesco Maria della Torre (1764–1779 Died)
- Stefano Giustiniani (1779–29 Mar 1791 Died)
- Paolo Maggiolo (1791–7 Aug 1802 Died)
- Angelo Vincenzo Andrea Maria Dania, O.P. (1802–1818 Died)
- Carmelo Cordiviola (1820–1827)

Sede vacante (1827–1832)

- Vincenzo-Tommaso Pirattoni, O.P. (1832–1839)
- Raffaele Biale (1840–1870)
- Pietro Anacleto Siboni (1871–1877 Died)
- Gaetano Alimonda (1877–1879 Resigned)
- Filippo Allegro (1879–1910 Died)

==== since 1900 ====
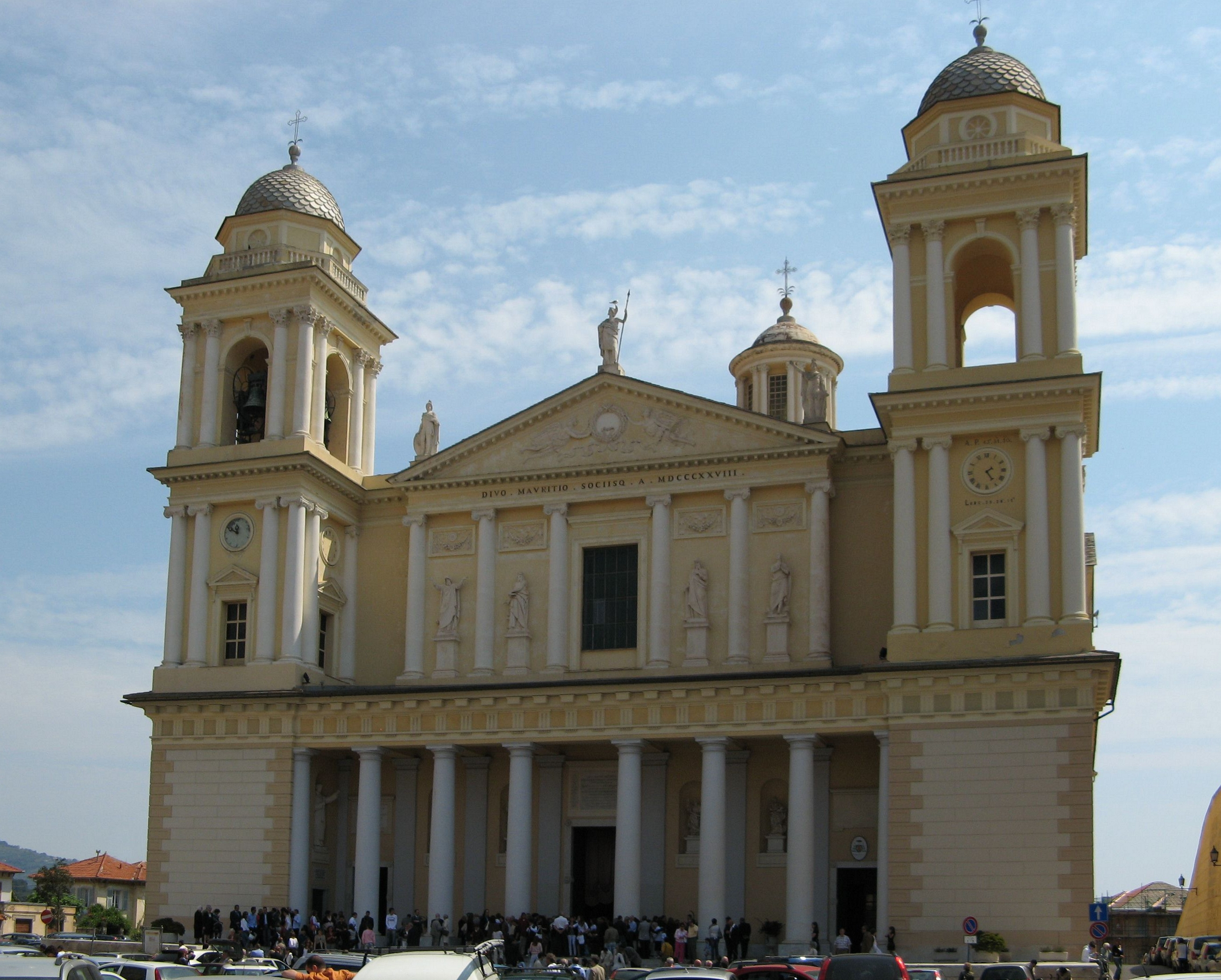
Co-cathedral in Imperia

- Giosuè Cattarossi (1911–1913)
- Pacifico Celso Carletti, O.F.M. Cap. (1914–1914 Died)
- Angelo Cambiaso (1915–1946 Died)
- Raffaele De Giuli (1946–1963 Died)
- Gilberto Baroni (1963–1965 Appointed, Bishop of Reggio Emilia)
- Alessandro Piazza (1965–1990 Retired)

=== Diocese of Albenga-Imperia ===
Name Changed: 1 December 1973

- Mario Oliveri (1990–2016 Resigned)
- Guglielmo Borghetti (2016– )

== Parishes ==
The Diocese of Albenga-Imperia maintains its own list of parishes in the diocese. The diocese's 163 parishes are divided between the provinces of Imperia and Savona, both in Liguria

=== Liguria ===
==== Province of Imperia ====
Aquila d'Arroscia
S. Reparata
Armo
Natività di Maria SS.
Aurigo
Natività di Maria Vergine e S. Bernardo
Borghetto d'Arroscia
S. Marco
S. Colombano (Gavenola)
S. Bernardino Da Siena (Gazzo)
S. Bernardo (Leverone)
Santi Antonio Abate Lorenzo e Giovanni Battista (Ubaga)
Borgomaro
Santi Antonio e Bernardino Da Siena
Natività di Maria Vergine (Conio)
S. Lazzaro (San Lazzaro Reale)
S. Pietro in Vincoli (Ville San Pietro)
Santi Nazario e Celso (Ville San Sebastiano)
Caravonica
Santi Michele e Bartolomeo
Cervo
S. Giovanni Battista
Cesio
Santi Lucia e Benedetto (Arzeno d’Oneglia-Cesio)
Chiusanico
S. Stefano (Chiusanico-Pontedassio)
S. Andrea (Gazzelli)
S. Martino (Torria)
Chiusavecchia
Santi Biagio e Francesco di Sales
Presentazione della Beata Vergine Maria Al Tempio e Santi Vincenzo e Anastasio (Sarola)
Civezza
S. Marco
Cosio di Arroscia
S. Pietro
Diano Arentino
Santi Margherita e Bernardo
S. Michele (Diano Borello)
Diano Castello
S. Nicolò di Bari
Diano Marina
S. Antonio Abate
Santi Anna e Giacomo (Diano Calderina)
Santi Leonardo e Nicola (Dianogorleri)
Diano San Pietro
S. Pietro
Natività di Maria Vergine e S. Lucia (Borganzo)
Dolcedo
S. Tommaso
S. Agostino (Lecchiore)
Imperia
Cristo Re
S. Benedetto Revelli
S. Giovanni Battista
S. Giuseppe
S. Luca Evangelista
S. Maurizio
Sacra Famiglia
S. Sebastiano (Artallo)
S. Agata (Borgo Sant’Agata)
S. Michele (Borgo d’Oneglia)
Santi Simone e Giuda (Cantalupo)
S. Bartolomeo (Caramagna Ligure)
S. Maria Maggiore (Castelvecchio di Santa Maria Maggiore)
S. Antonio (Costa d’Oneglia)
S. Bernardo (Moltedo)
SS. Annunziata (Montegrazie)
S. Bernardo (Oliveto)
Nostra Signora Assunta (Piani di Imperia)
Nostra Signora della Neve (Poggi di Imperia)
S. Giorgio (Torrazza)
Lucinasco
Santi Stefano e Antonino
S. Pantaleone (Borgoratto)
Mendatica
Santi Nazario e Celso
Montegrosso Pian Latte
S. Biagio
Pietrabruna
Santi Matteo e Gregorio
Pieve di Teco
S. Giovanni Battista
S. Giacomo Maggiore (Acquetico)
S. Giorgio (Calderara)
Nostra Signora Assunta e S. Martino (Moano)
S. Michele (Nirasca)
Pontedassio
S. Margherita
S. Michele (Bestagno)
S. Matteo (Villa Guardia)
Nostra Signora Assunta (Villa Viani)
Pornassio
S. Dalmazzo
Prelà
S. Giovanni Battista (Molini di Prelà)
SS. Annunziata (Tavole)
Santi Gervasio e Protasio (Valloria)
S. Michele (Villatalla)
Ranzo
Nostra Signora Assunta e S. Donato (Bacelega)
S. Bernardo (Costa Bacelega)
Rezzo
S. Martino
Nostra Signora Assunta (Cenova)
S. Antonio (Lavina)
San Bartolomeo al Mare
Nostra Signora della Rovere
S. Bartolomeo
Santi Mauro e Giacomo Maggiore (Chiappa)
Nostra Signora della Neve (Pairola)
Vasia
Santi Antonio Giacomo e Nicola
Trasfigurazione di Nostro Signore e S. Sebastiano (Pantasina)
Vessalico
Santi Maria Maddalena Processo Martiniano e Matteo (Lenzari)
Villa Faraldi
Trasfigurazione di Nostro Signore e S. Bernardo (Riva Faraldi)
Santi Lorenzo e Antonio (Tovo Faraldi)

==== Province of Savona ====
Alassio
S. Ambrogio
S. Maria Immacolata
S. Vincenzo Ferreri
S. Sebastiano (Moglio di Alassio)
SS. Annunziata (Solva)
Albenga
Nostra Signora di Pontelungo
S. Bernardino Da Siena
S. Michele
Sacro Cuore
SS. Annunziata (Bastia)
Santi Fabiano e Sebastiano (Campochiesa)
Nostra Signora Assunta (Leca)
S. Margherita (Lusignano)
S. Giacomo Maggiore (Salea)
Santi Simone e Giuda (San Fedele)
S. Giorgio (San Giorgio)
Andora
S. Bartolomeo
S. Giovanni Battista
S. Pietro
S. Andrea (Conna)
Cuore Immacolato di Maria (Marina di Andora)
S. Matilde (Marina di Andora)
SS. Trinità (Rollo)
Arnasco
Nostra Signora Assunta
Balestrino
S. Andrea
Boissano
S. Maria Maddalena
Borghetto Santo Spirito
S. Antonio Da Padova
S. Matteo
Borgio Verezzi
S. Pietro
S. Martino (Verezzi)
Casanova Lerrone
S. Antonino
S. Giovanni Battista (Bassanico)
S. Luca (Degna)
Santi Apostoli Pietro e Paolo (Marmoreo)
Santi Antonio Abate e Giuliano (Vellego)
Castelbianco
Nostra Signora Assunta
Castelvecchio di Rocca Barbena
Nostra Signora Assunta
Nostra Signora della Neve (Vecersio)
Ceriale
Santi Giovanni Battista ed Eugenio
S. Giovanni Battista (Peagna)
Cisano sul Neva
S. Maria Maddalena
S. Nicolò di Bari (Cenesi)
S. Alessandro (Conscente)
Erli
S. Caterina
Finale Ligure
S. Bartolomeo (Gorra)
S. Giovanni Battista Decollato (Olle Superiore)
Garlenda
Natività di Maria SS.
Giustenice
Santi Lorenzo e Michele
Laigueglia
S. Matteo
Loano
S. Giovanni Battista
S. Maria Immacolata
S. Pio X
S. Maria delle Grazie (Verzi)
Magliolo
S. Antonio Abate
Nasino
S. Giovanni Battista
Onzo
S. Martino
Ortovero
S. Silvestro
Santi Stefano e Matteo (Pogli)
Pietra Ligure
N. Signora del Soccorso
S. Nicolò di Bari
S. Bernardo (Ranzi)
Stellanello
Nostra Signora Assunta
S. Gregorio Magno
Santi Vincenzo e Anastasio
Santi Cosma e Damiano (San Damiano)
Santi Lorenzo e Bernardino Da Siena (San Lorenzo-Bossaneto)
Testico
Santi Bernardo Pietro e Paolo (Ginestro)
Toirano
S. Martino
S. Bernardo (Carpe)
Tovo San Giacomo
S. Giacomo Maggiore
S. Sebastiano (Bardino Nuovo)
S. Giovanni Battista (Bardino Vecchio)
Vendone
S. Antonino
Nostra Signora della Neve (Curenna)
Villanova d'Albenga
S. Stefano
S. Bernardo (Ligo)
Zuccarello
S. Bartolomeo

== Books ==
- Eubel, Conradus, ed. (1913). Hierarchia catholica, Tomus 1 (second ed.). Münster: Libreria Regensbergiana. (in Latin)
- Eubel, Conradus, ed. (1914). Hierarchia catholica, Tomus 2 (second ed.). Münster: Libreria Regensbergiana.
- Gulik, Guilelmus (1923). Eubel, Conradus (ed.). Hierarchia catholica, Tomus 3 (second ed.). Münster: Libreria Regensbergiana.
- Gams, Pius Bonifatius (1873). Series episcoporum Ecclesiae catholicae: quotquot innotuerunt a beato Petro apostolo (in Latin). Ratisbon: Typis et Sumptibus Georgii Josephi Manz.
- Gauchat, Patritius (Patrice) (1935). Hierarchia catholica IV (1592-1667). Münster: Libraria Regensbergiana.
- Ritzler, Remigius; Sefrin, Pirminus (1952). Hierarchia catholica medii et recentis aevi V (1667-1730). Patavii: Messagero di S. Antonio.
- Ritzler, Remigius; Sefrin, Pirminus (1958). Hierarchia catholica medii et recentis aevi VI (1730-1799). Patavii: Messagero di S. Antonio.
- Ritzler, Remigius; Sefrin, Pirminus (1968). Hierarchia Catholica medii et recentioris aevi sive summorum pontificum, S. R. E. cardinalium, ecclesiarum antistitum series... A pontificatu Pii PP. VII (1800) usque ad pontificatum Gregorii PP. XVI (1846) (in Latin). Vol. VII. Monasterii: Libr. Regensburgiana.
- Remigius Ritzler; Pirminus Sefrin (1978). Hierarchia catholica Medii et recentioris aevi... A Pontificatu PII PP. IX (1846) usque ad Pontificatum Leonis PP. XIII (1903) (in Latin). Vol. VIII. Il Messaggero di S. Antonio.
- Pięta, Zenon (2002). Hierarchia catholica medii et recentioris aevi... A pontificatu Pii PP. X (1903) usque ad pontificatum Benedictii PP. XV (1922) (in Latin). Vol. IX. Padua: Messagero di San Antonio. ISBN 978-88-250-1000-8.

=== Studies ===
- Accame, P. (1898), "Cenni storici sul Capitolo della cattedrale di Albenga," Giornale ligustico di archeologia, storia e belle arti (in Italian). Vol. 23. Genova: Tip. del R. Istituto Sordo-Muti. 1898. pp. 434–457.
- Cappelletti, Giuseppe (1857). Le chiese d'Italia della loro origine sino ai nostri giorni (in Italian). Vol. decimoterzo (13). Venezia: Giuseppe Antonelli. pp. 529–575.
- Chabrol de Volvic, Gilbert-Joseph-Gaspard, Comte de (1824). Statistique des provinces de Savone, d'Oneille, d'Acqui et de partie de la provincie [i.e. province] de Mondovi formant l'ancien departement de Montenotte (in French). Paris: Jules Didot. pp. 134–143, 170. Tome II. 1824. [Albenga under the French]
- Desimoni, Cornelio (1888). "Regesti delle lettere pontificie riguardanti la Liguria". Atti della Società Ligure di Storia Patria XIX (Genova 1888), pp. 5–146. (in Italian)
- Embriaco, Primo Giovanni (2004). Vescovi e signori: la Chiesa albenganese dal declino dell'autorità regia all'egemonia genovese : secoli XI-XIII (in Italian). Bordighera (Imperia): Istituto internazionale di studi liguri, Sezione ingauna. ISBN 978-88-86796-18-7.
- Kehr, Paul Fridolin (1914). Italia pontificia : sive, Repertorium privilegiorum et litterarum a romanis pontificibus ante annum 1598 Italiae ecclesiis, monasteriis, civitatibus singulisque personis concessorum. Vol. VI. pars ii. Berolini: Weidmann. pp. 358–362.
- Lanzoni, Francesco (1927). Le diocesi d'Italia dalle origini al principio del secolo VII (an. 604). Faenza: F. Lega, pp. 841–842.
- Semeria, Giovanni Battista (1843). Secoli cristiani della Liguria, ossia, Storia della metropolitana di Genova, delle diocesi di Sarzana, di Brugnato, Savona, Noli, Albegna e Ventimiglia (in Italian). Vol. I. Torino: Tip. Chirio e Mina. Volume II. [II, pp. 345–475]
- Rossi, Girolamo (1870). Storia della città e diocesi di Albenga (in Italian). Albenga: Tip. di T. Craviotto.
- Ughelli, Ferdinando; Coleti, Niccolo (1719). Italia sacra, sive de episcopis Italiae et insularum adjacentium (in Latin). Vol. Tomus quartus (4) (2nd ed.). Venice: Apud Sebastianum Coleti. pp. 910–924.
