= Girolamo Cardinal Grimaldi =

Girolamo Cardinal Grimaldi may refer to:

- Girolamo Grimaldi (d. 1543)
- Girolamo Grimaldi (d. 1733)
