= Giangiacomo =

Giangiacomo is an Italian given name, a combination of the names Gian and Giacomo. Notable people with the name include:

- Giangiacomo Borghese (1889–1954), Italian politician, fascist governor of Rome
- Giangiacomo Calovini, member of the Chamber of Deputies of Italy
- Giangiacomo Feltrinelli (1926–1972), Italian publisher, businessman and political activist
- Giangiacomo di Gambarana (died 1538), Roman Catholic prelate, Bishop of Albenga
- Giangiacomo Guelfi (1924–2012), Italian operatic baritone
- Giangiacomo Magnani (born 1995), Italian professional footballer
- Giangiacomo Moretti (born 1843), Italian painter
- Giangiacomo Paleologo (1395–1445), Margrave of Montferrat
- Giangiacomo Teodoro Trivulzio (1597–1656), Italian Cardinal

== See also ==
- Francesco Giangiacomo (1783–1864), Italian illustrator and engraver
- Giangiacomo Feltrinelli Editore, Italian publishing company founded in 1954
