= Magnotta =

Magnotta is an Italian surname. Notable people with the surname include:

- Luka Magnotta (born 1982), Canadian pornographic actor and convicted murderer
- Mario Magnotta (1942–2009), Italian janitor and internet celebrity
