= Villanova d'Albenga =

- Comune
- Comune di Villanova d'Albenga
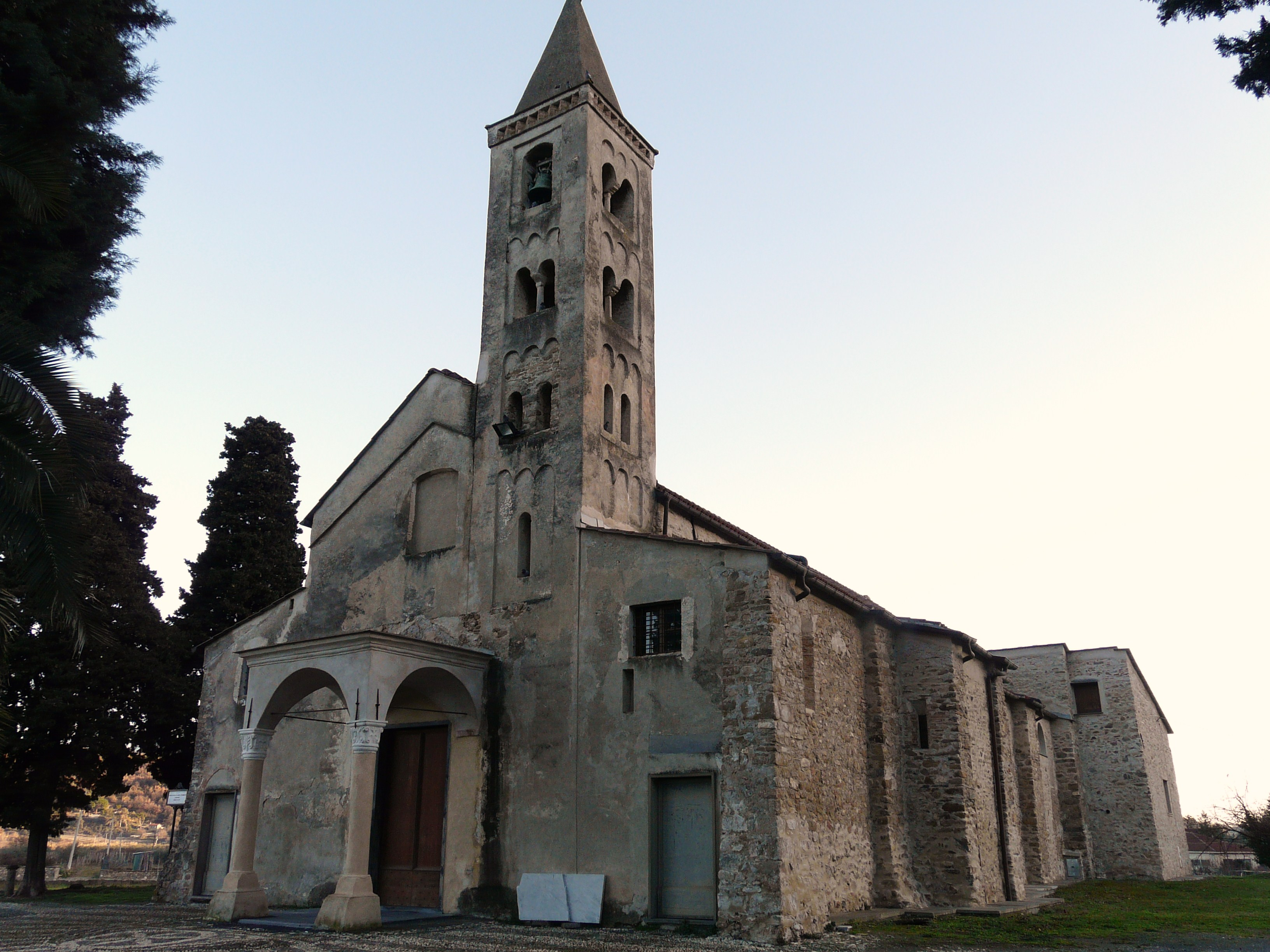
- Saint Stephen Church

- Coat of arms

- Location within Italy Location within Liguria
- Coordinates: 44°2′N 8°8′E
- Country: Italy
- Region: Liguria
- Province: Savona (SV)

Government
  - Mayor: Pietro Balestra

Area
  - Total: 15.7 km^{2} (6.1 sq mi)
- Elevation: 29 m (95 ft)

Population (31 December 2015)
  - Total: 2,657
  - Density: 169/km^{2} (438/sq mi)
- Demonym: Villanovesi
- Time zone: UTC+1 (CET)
  - Summer (DST): UTC+2 (CEST)
- Postal code: 17038
- Dialing code: 0182
- Website: Official website

Villanova d'Albenga (Ligurian: Villanêuva d'Arbenga) is a comune (municipality) in the Province of Savona in the Italian region Liguria, located about 80 kilometres (50 mi) southwest of Genoa and about 40 kilometres (25 mi) southwest of Savona.

Villanova d'Albenga borders the following municipalities: Alassio, Albenga, Andora, Casanova Lerrone, Garlenda, and Ortovero.
