= Leonardo Marchesi =

Italian Roman Catholic prelate

Most Reverend Leonardo Marchesi
- Bishop of Albenga
- Church: Catholic Church
- Diocese: Diocese of Albenga
- In office: 1476–1513
- Predecessor: Girolamo Basso Della Rovere
- Successor: Bandinello Sauli

Personal details
- Died: 31 July 1513 Albenga, Italy

Leonardo Marchesi (died 1513) was a Roman Catholic prelate who served as Bishop of Albenga (1476–1513).

== Biography ==
On 5 Oct 1476, Leonardo Marchesi was appointed during the papacy of Pope Sixtus IV as Bishop of Albenga. He served as Bishop of Albenga until his death on 31 Jul 1513.

== External links and additional sources ==
- Cheney, David M. "Diocese of Albenga-Imperia". Catholic-Hierarchy.org. (for Chronology of Bishops)
- Chow, Gabriel. "Diocese of Albenga-Imperia (Italy)". GCatholic.org. (for Chronology of Bishops)

Catholic Church titles
Preceded by Girolamo Basso Della Rovere	Bishop of Albenga; 1476–1513	Succeeded by Bandinello Sauli
