= Bandinello Sauli =

Italian bishop and cardinal

His Eminence Bandinello Sauli
- Cardinal Bishop of Gerace
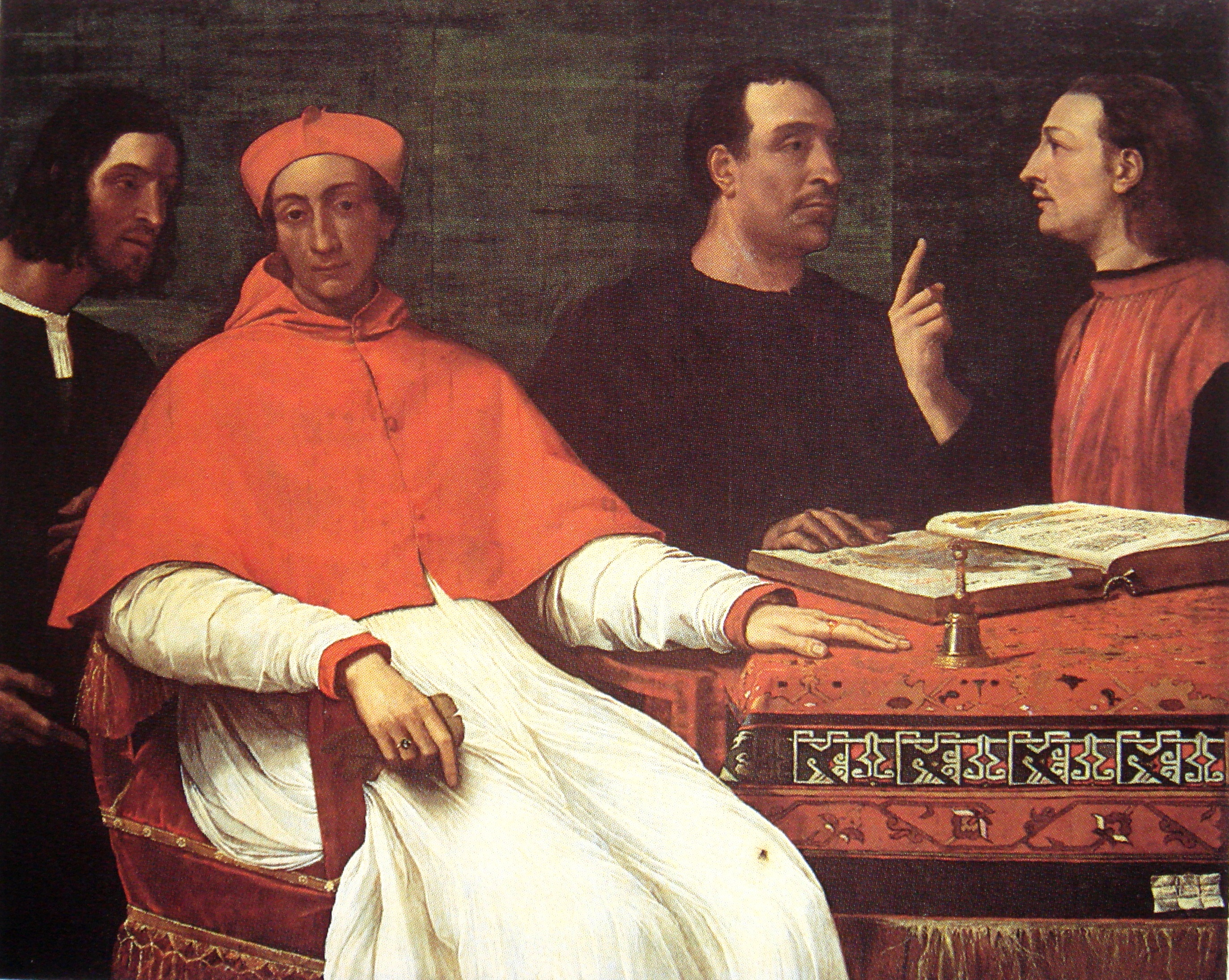
- Painting, ca. 1512, by Sebastiano del Piombo, showing Cardinal Bandinello Sauli with his secretary and two geographers.
- Church: Roman Catholic
- Diocese: Gerace
- Appointed: 1509
- In office: 1509–1517
- Predecessor: Jaime de Conchillos
- Successor: Francesco Armellini Pantalassi de' Medici
- Other post: Cardinal–Deacon of Santa Maria in Trastevere
- Previous posts: Bishop of Malta (1506–1509); Administrator of Albenga (1513–1517)

Orders
- Created cardinal: 10 March 1511 by Pope Julius II
- Rank: Cardinal–Deacon

Personal details
- Born: 1481 Genoa
- Died: 29 March 1518 (age 37) Monterotondo

Bandinello Sauli (c. 1481 – 28 March 1518) was an Italian Roman Catholic bishop and cardinal.

== Biography ==
Bandinello Sauli was born in Genoa, ca. 1481, the son of nobles Pasquale Sauli and Mariola Giustiniani Longhi.

Early in his career, he was a protonotary apostolic in Rome. He was also an abbreviator and papal scribe until 1511.

On 5 October 1506 Sauli was appointed Bishop of Malta at the age of 12. He held this position until 1509 when he was elected Bishop of Gerace and Oppido. He held this post until 19 November 1517.

Pope Julius II made him a cardinal deacon in the consistory of 10 March 1511. He received the red hat on 13 March 1511 and the deaconry of Sant'Adriano al Foro. He opted for the titular church of Santa Sabina on 24 October 1511.

He participated in the papal conclave of 1513 that elected Pope Leo X.

He was administrator of the see of Albenga from 5 August 1513 until 19 November 1517. On 18 July 1516 he opted for the titular church of Santa Maria in Trastevere.

On 22 June 1517 he was deposed as a cardinal by Pope Leo X, arrested, and placed in the Castel Sant'Angelo for his failure to disclose the assassination plot of Cardinal Alfonso Petrucci. The pope restored him to the cardinalate sed non ad vocem activam et passivam on 31 July 1517, then restored him completely on 25 December 1517.

Cardinal Sauli died in Monterotondo on 29 March 1518. He was buried in Santa Maria in Trastevere.

Catholic Church titles
Preceded by Antonio Corseto	Bishop of Malta; 1506–1509	Succeeded by Bernardino da Bologna
Preceded by Jaime de Conchillos	Bishop of Gerace; 1509–1517	Succeeded by Francesco Armellini Pantalassi de' Medici
Preceded by Leonardo Marchesi	Administrator of Albenga; 1513–1517	Succeeded by Giulio de' Medici
