= Casanova Lerrone =

- Comune
- Comune di Casanova Lerrone
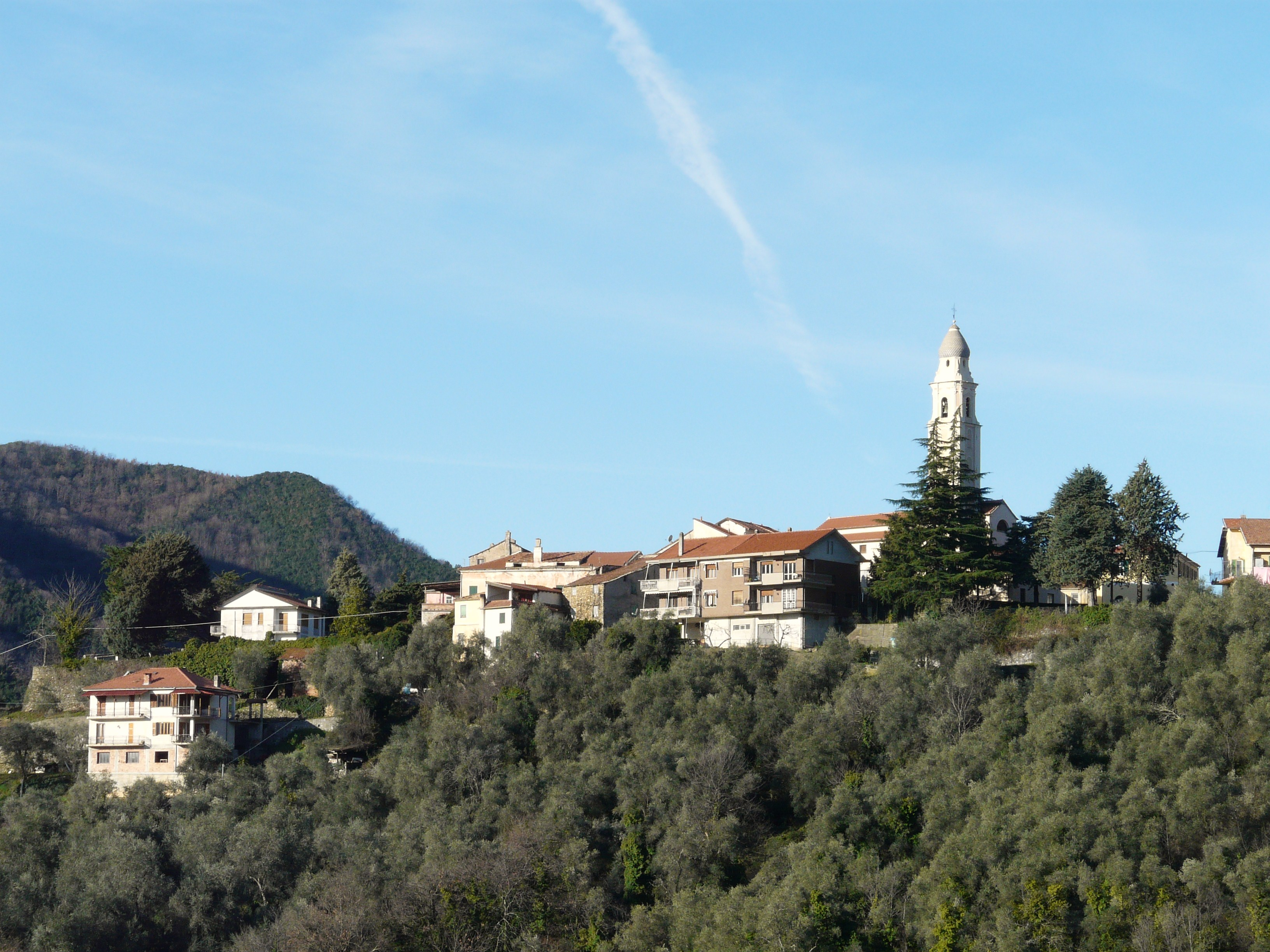
- Casanova Lerrone

- Flag Coat of arms

- Location within Italy Location within Liguria
- Coordinates: 44°2′N 8°3′E
- Country: Italy
- Region: Liguria
- Province: Savona (SV)

Government
  - Mayor: Michele Volpati

Area
  - Total: 24.23 km^{2} (9.36 sq mi)
- Elevation: 256 m (840 ft)

Population (31 May 2017)
  - Total: 732
  - Density: 30.2/km^{2} (78.2/sq mi)
- Demonym: Casanovesi
- Time zone: UTC+1 (CET)
  - Summer (DST): UTC+2 (CEST)
- Postal code: 17033
- Dialing code: 0182
- Website: Official website

Casanova Lerrone (Ligurian: Casanêuva) is a comune (municipality) in the Province of Savona in the Italian region Liguria, located about 80 kilometres (50 mi) southwest of Genoa and about 45 kilometres (28 mi) southwest of Savona.

Casanova Lerrone borders the following municipalities: Borghetto d'Arroscia, Cesio, Garlenda, Onzo, Ortovero, Ranzo, Stellanello, Testico, Vessalico, and Villanova d'Albenga.
