= Gaetano Alimonda =

Italian prelate

His Eminence Gaetano Alimonda
- Archbishop of Turin
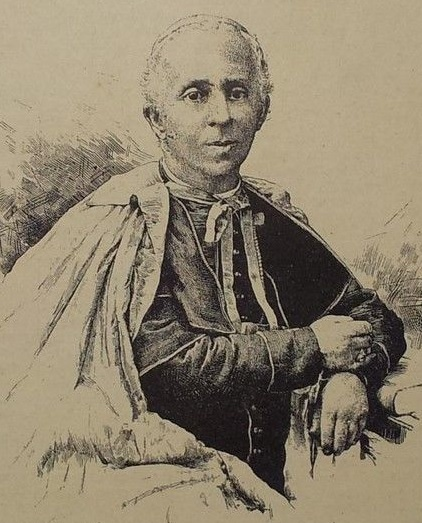
- Church: Roman Catholic Church
- Archdiocese: Turin
- See: Turin
- Appointed: 9 August 1883
- Term ended: 30 May 1891
- Predecessor: Lorenzo Gastaldi
- Successor: Davide Riccardi
- Other post: Cardinal-Priest of Santa Maria in Traspontina (1879-91)
- Previous post: Bishop of Albenga (1877-79)

Orders
- Ordination: 10 June 1843
- Consecration: 11 November 1877 by Salvatore Magnasco
- Created cardinal: 12 May 1879 by Pope Leo XIII
- Rank: Cardinal-Priest

Personal details
- Born: Gaetano Alimonda; 23 October 1818 Genoa, Kingdom of Sardinia
- Died: 30 May 1891 (aged 72) Albaro, Genoa, Kingdom of Italy
- Parents: Giacomo Alimonda; Giulia de Cammilli
- Education: University of Genoa
- Motto: Et mundo corde

Gaetano Alimonda (23 October 1818 – 30 May 1891) was an Italian prelate of the Catholic Church, who was Archbishop of Turin from 1883 until his death. He was previously Bishop of Albenga from 1877 to 1879. He was made a cardinal in 1879.

== Biography ==
Gaetano Alimonda was born in Genoa on 23 October 1818. He studied at the University of Genoa. He earned a doctorate in theology. He was ordained a priest on 10 June 1843.

He lectured at the seminary before becoming vice-superior and, finally, rector in 1854. His authorities backed his resistance to obstinate supporters of papal privileges, and he wrote for journals that advocated for moderation and tolerance with Italian unity. He was committed to an increased role for the laity and therefore worked to develop Catholic publishing and undertook an extensive program of preaching, modeled on the work of Lacordaire in France, in defense of Christian civilization against rationalism.

Pope Pius IX appointed him bishop of Albenga on 21 September 1877. He received his episcopal consecration on 11 November 1877 from Salvatore Magnasco, archbishop of Genoa. In that post he continued to advocate for reconciliation with Vittorio Emanuele II and the House of Savoy.

He resigned as bishop when Pope Leo XIII made him a cardinal priest on 12 May 1879, one of the first group of cardinals Leo created. He received his red galero as well as the title of Santa Maria in Traspontina in the consistory of 22 September 1879.

Pope Leo appointed him archbishop of Turin on 9 August 1883.

In 1887, at Pope Leo's suggestion, he wrote a tract advocating rapprochement: I voti degli italiani per la pace religiosa.

He died in a convent in the Albaro neighborhood of Genoa of liver disease on 30 May 1891.
