= Carlo Cicala =

Italian Roman Catholic prelate

Most Reverend Carlo Cicala
- Bishop of Albenga
- Church: Catholic Church
- Diocese: Diocese of Albenga
- In office: 1554–1572
- Predecessor: Giovanni Battista Cicala
- Successor: Carlo Grimaldi

Carlo Cicala or Carlo Cicada was a Roman Catholic prelate who served as Bishop of Albenga (1554–1572).

== Biography ==
On 30 March 1554, Carlo Cicala was appointed during the papacy of Pope Julius III as Bishop of Albenga. He served as Bishop of Albenga until his resignation in 1572.

== Episcopal succession ==
While bishop, he was the principal co-consecrator of:

- Benedetto Lomellini, Bishop of Ventimiglia (1565);
- Filippo Spinola, Bishop of Bisignano (1566); and
- Luca Fieschi, Bishop of Andria (1566).

== External links and additional sources ==
- Cheney, David M. "Diocese of Albenga-Imperia". Catholic-Hierarchy.org. (for Chronology of Bishops) ^{[self-published]}
- Chow, Gabriel. "Diocese of Albenga-Imperia (Italy)". GCatholic.org. (for Chronology of Bishops) ^{[self-published]}

Catholic Church titles
Preceded by Giovanni Battista Cicala	Bishop of Albenga; 1554–1572	Succeeded by Carlo Grimaldi
