= Giangiacomo di Gambarana =

Italian Roman Catholic prelate

Most Reverend Giangiacomo di Gambarana
- Bishop of Albenga
- Church: Catholic Church
- Diocese: Diocese of Albenga
- In office: 1518–1538
- Predecessor: Giulio de' Medici
- Successor: Girolamo Grimaldi

Personal details
- Died: 1538 Albenga, Italy

Giangiacomo di Gambarana (Joannes Jacobus ex comitibus Gambaranae) (died 1538) was a Roman Catholic prelate who served as Bishop of Albenga (1518–1538).

== Biography ==
Gambarana obtained the post of Protonotary Apostolic in the Roman Curia. He served as Governor of the City of Rome.

On 29 August 1529 he was appointed by Pope Clement VII as Vice-Legate of the Marches; he served until 1 July 1531.

On 5 May 1518, Giangiacomo di Gambarana was appointed during the papacy of Pope Leo X as Bishop of Albenga. In November 1523, Bishop di Gambarana presided over the transfer and enshrinement of the relics of the martyr Saint Calocero in the Church of Saint Calocero in Albenga. On 1 June 1531, Bishop Gambarana held a diocesan synod with his clergy in the sacristy of the Cathedral. He held the office of Bishop of Albenga until his death in 1538, while serving in other offices and other capacities.

He died in his native Pavia and was buried in the Church of S. Giacomo fuori le mura.

== External links and additional sources ==
- Cheney, David M. "Diocese of Albenga-Imperia". Catholic-Hierarchy.org. (for Chronology of Bishops)
- Chow, Gabriel. "Diocese of Albenga-Imperia (Italy)". GCatholic.org. (for Chronology of Bishops)

Catholic Church titles
Preceded by Giulio de' Medici	Bishop of Albenga; 1518–1538	Succeeded by Girolamo Grimaldi
