= Lenzari =

- Frazione
- Location of Lenzari in Italy
- Coordinates: 44°3′56″N 7°57′37″E
- Country: Italy
- Region: Liguria
- Province: Imperia
- Comune: Vessalico
- Time zone: UTC+1 (CET)
  - Summer (DST): UTC+2 (CEST)
- Postal code: 18026
- Dialing code: 0183

Lenzari is a small village in the municipality of Vessalico, located in the Province of Imperia in the Italian region of Liguria.
