= Capo Mele Lighthouse =

Lighthouse in Liguria, Italy

Capo Mele
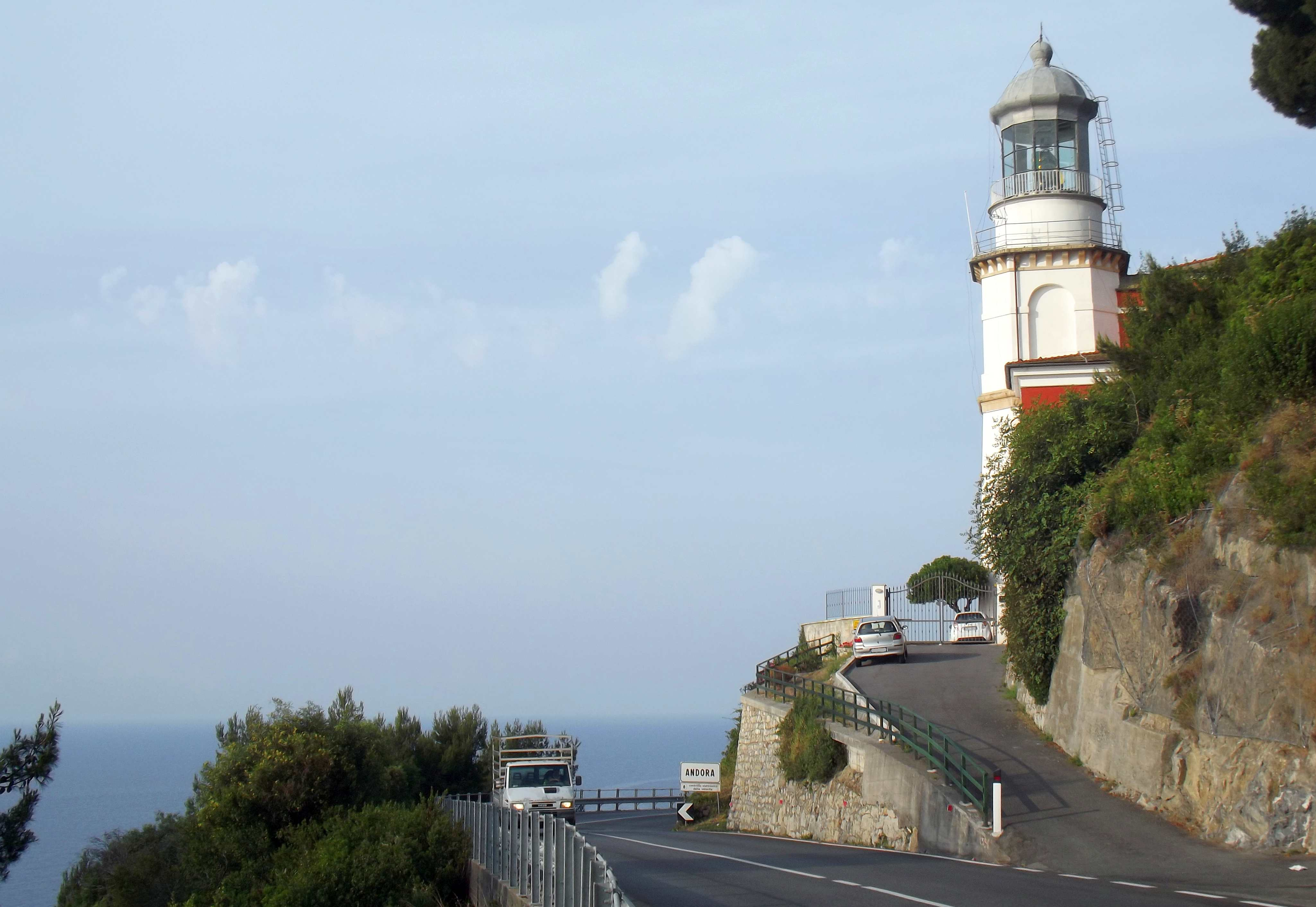
- The lighthouse seen from the former national road Via Aurelia
- Location: Marina di Andora; Liguria; Italy
- Coordinates: 43°57′19″N 8°10′20″E

Tower
- Constructed: 1856
- Construction: masonry tower
- Height: 25 metres (82 ft)
- Shape: octagonal tower with balcony and lantern on a red brick building
- Markings: white tower and lantern, grey metallic dome
- Power source: mains electricity
- Operator: Marina Militare
- Heritage: Italian national heritage

Light
- First lit: 1856
- Focal height: 94 metres (308 ft)
- Lens: Type OR T3
- Intensity: main: AL 1000 W reserve: LABI 100 W
- Range: main: 24 nautical miles (44 km; 28 mi) reserve: 18 nautical miles (33 km; 21 mi)
- Characteristic: Fl (3) W 15s.
- Italy no.: 1506 E.F.

Capo Mele Lighthouse (Italian: Faro di Capo Mele) is an active lighthouse in northwestern Italy. It is located on Capo Mele, on the border of the comunes of Andora (to the west) and Laigueglia (to the northeast) in the Province of Savona in Liguria.

== History ==
The lighthouse was constructed by the Civil Engineers and completed in 1856. Its architecture was not changed from the original for almost half a century, and was repainted from yellow to red. A petroleum lamp was installed in 1909, later with acetylene until 1936. Like many other lighthouses in Italy, this lighthouse was severely damaged during World War II, and the extensive damage was repaired between 1947 and 1948. In 1949 it was electrified.

== Description ==
The lighthouse is a circular 25 metres high masonry tower and the diameter of the lantern is 3.82 metres. It is reached by a staircase of 74 steps. Adjacent to the tower is a three-story brick building.

The lighthouse is still staffed and is managed by the Command Area Lighthouses Navy based in La Spezia (which incidentally takes care of all the lighthouses in the Tyrrhenian). The Marina Militare is responsible for managing all the lights on an approximate 8000 kilometers of Italian coastline since 1910, using both military and civilian technicians.

== See also ==
- List of lighthouses in Italy
