= Pieve di Teco =

Pieve di Teco Céve
- Comune
- Comune di Pieve di Teco
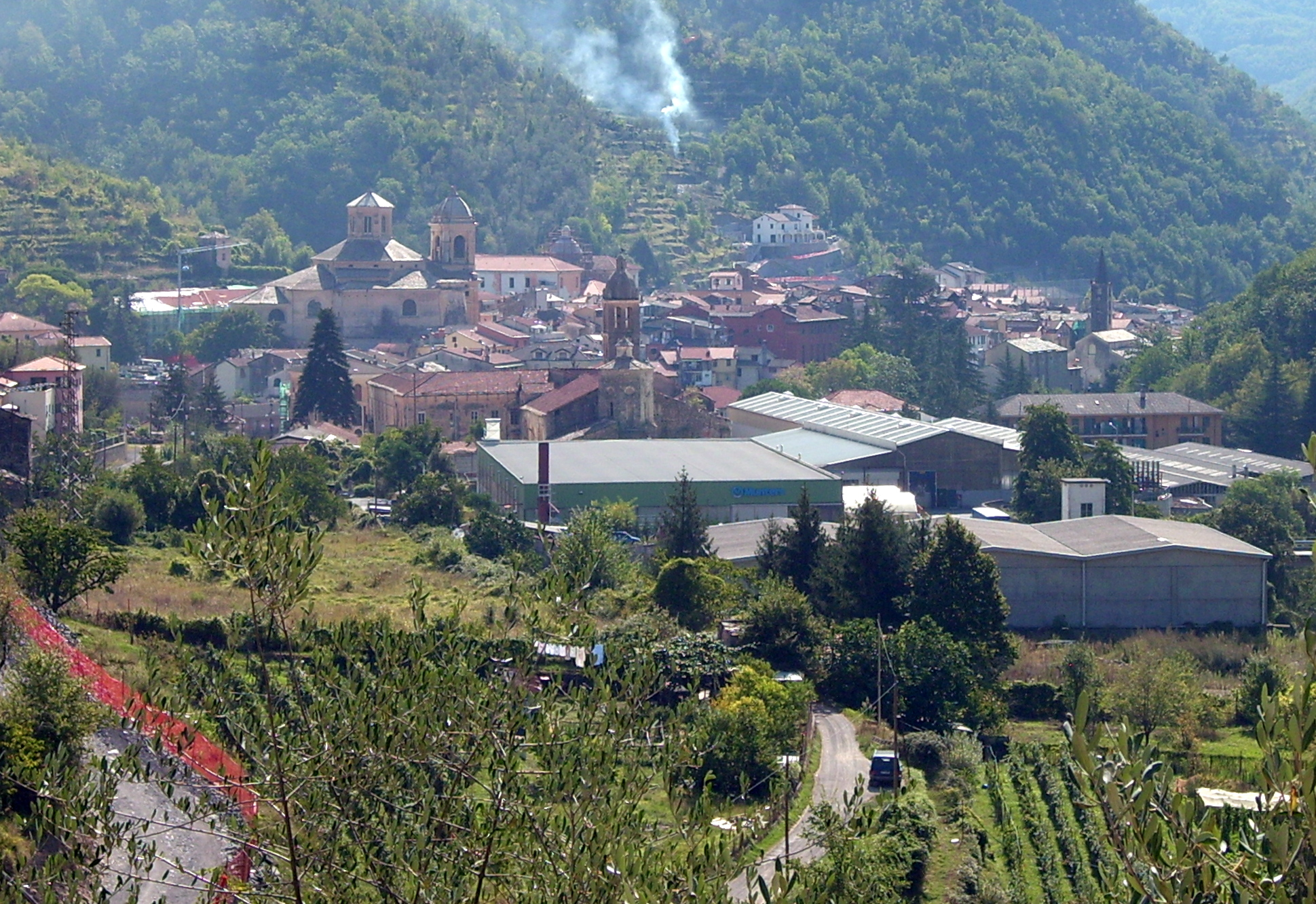
- View of Pieve di Teco

- Coat of arms

- Location within Italy Location within Liguria
- Coordinates: 44°3′N 7°55′E
- Country: Italy
- Region: Liguria
- Province: Imperia (IM)
- Frazioni: Moano, Trovasta, Nirasca, Acquetico, Muzio, Lovegno, Calderara

Government
  - Mayor: Alessandro Alessandri

Area
  - Total: 40.51 km^{2} (15.64 sq mi)
- Elevation: 240 m (790 ft)

Population (31 March 2018)
  - Total: 1,346
  - Density: 33.23/km^{2} (86.06/sq mi)
- Demonym: Pievesi
- Time zone: UTC+1 (CET)
  - Summer (DST): UTC+2 (CEST)
- Postal code: 18026
- Dialing code: 0183
- Website: Official website

Pieve di Teco (Ligurian: Céve) is a comune (municipality) in the Province of Imperia, in the Italian region Liguria, located about 90 kilometres (56 mi) southwest of Genoa and about 20 kilometres (12 mi) northwest of Imperia.

Pieve di Teco borders the following municipalities: Armo, Aurigo, Borghetto d'Arroscia, Borgomaro, Caprauna, Caravonica, Cesio, Pornassio, Rezzo, and Vessalico.

== Twin towns and sister cities ==
Pieve di Teco is twinned with:

- Bagnols-en-Forêt, France, since 1990

== People ==
- Mario Magnotta (1942–2009, born in Pieve, lived in L'Aquila)
