= Cesio =

Cesio Cexi
- Comune
- Comune di Cesio
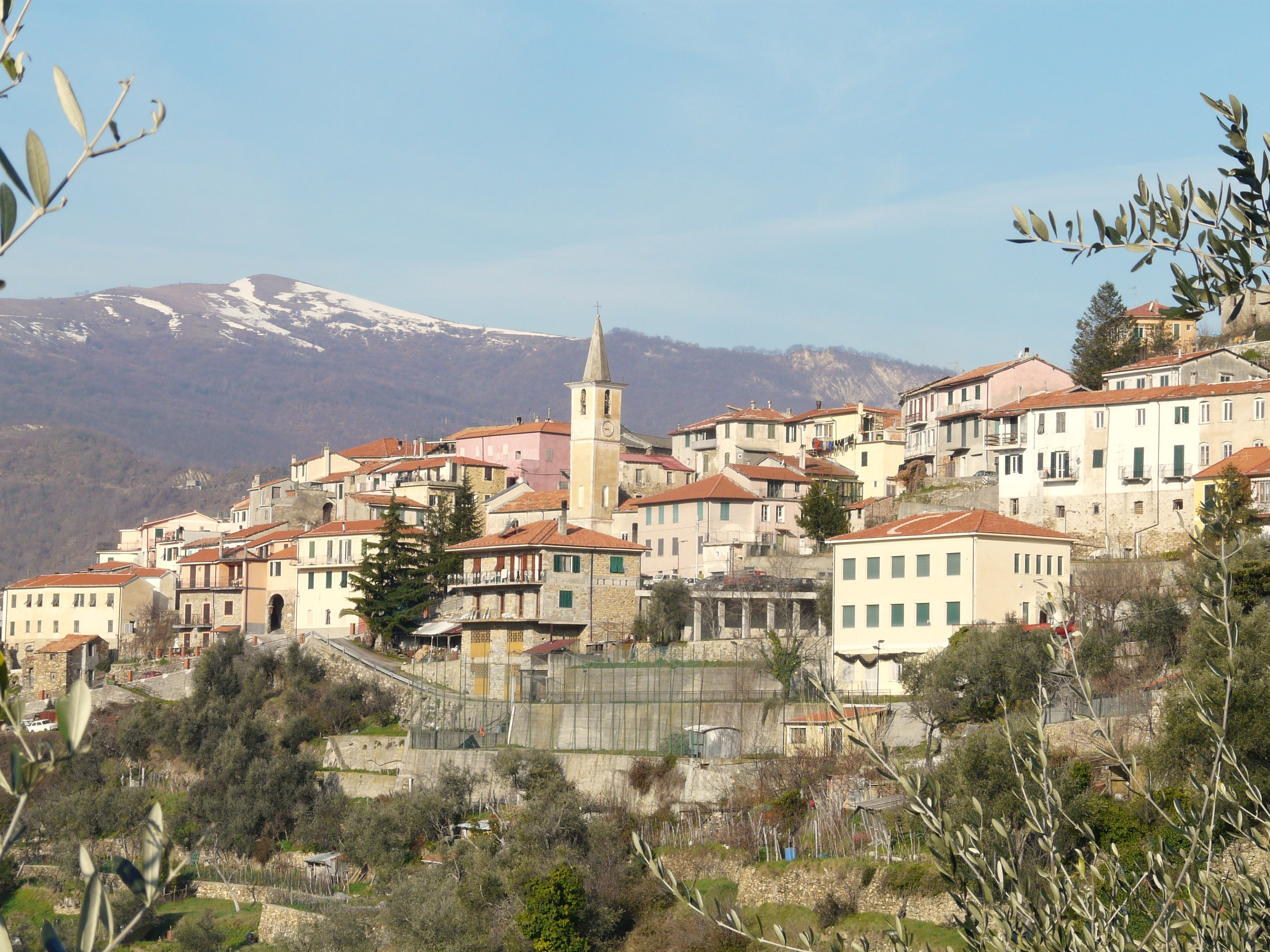
- View of Cesio

- Location within Italy Location within Liguria
- Coordinates: 44°0′N 7°59′E
- Country: Italy
- Region: Liguria
- Province: Imperia (IM)

Government
  - Mayor: Fabio Natta

Area
  - Total: 8.86 km^{2} (3.42 sq mi)
- Elevation: 530 m (1,740 ft)

Population (30 June 2017)
  - Total: 277
  - Density: 31.3/km^{2} (81.0/sq mi)
- Demonym: Cesaini or Cesiaschi
- Time zone: UTC+1 (CET)
  - Summer (DST): UTC+2 (CEST)
- Postal code: 18020
- Dialing code: 0183
- Website: Official website

Cesio (Ligurian: Cexi) is a comune (municipality) in the Province of Imperia in the Italian region Liguria, located about 90 kilometres (56 mi) southwest of Genoa and about 14 kilometres (9 mi) northwest of Imperia.

Cesio borders the following municipalities: Caravonica, Casanova Lerrone, Chiusanico, Pieve di Teco, Testico and Vessalico.
