= Testico =

- Comune
- Comune di Testico
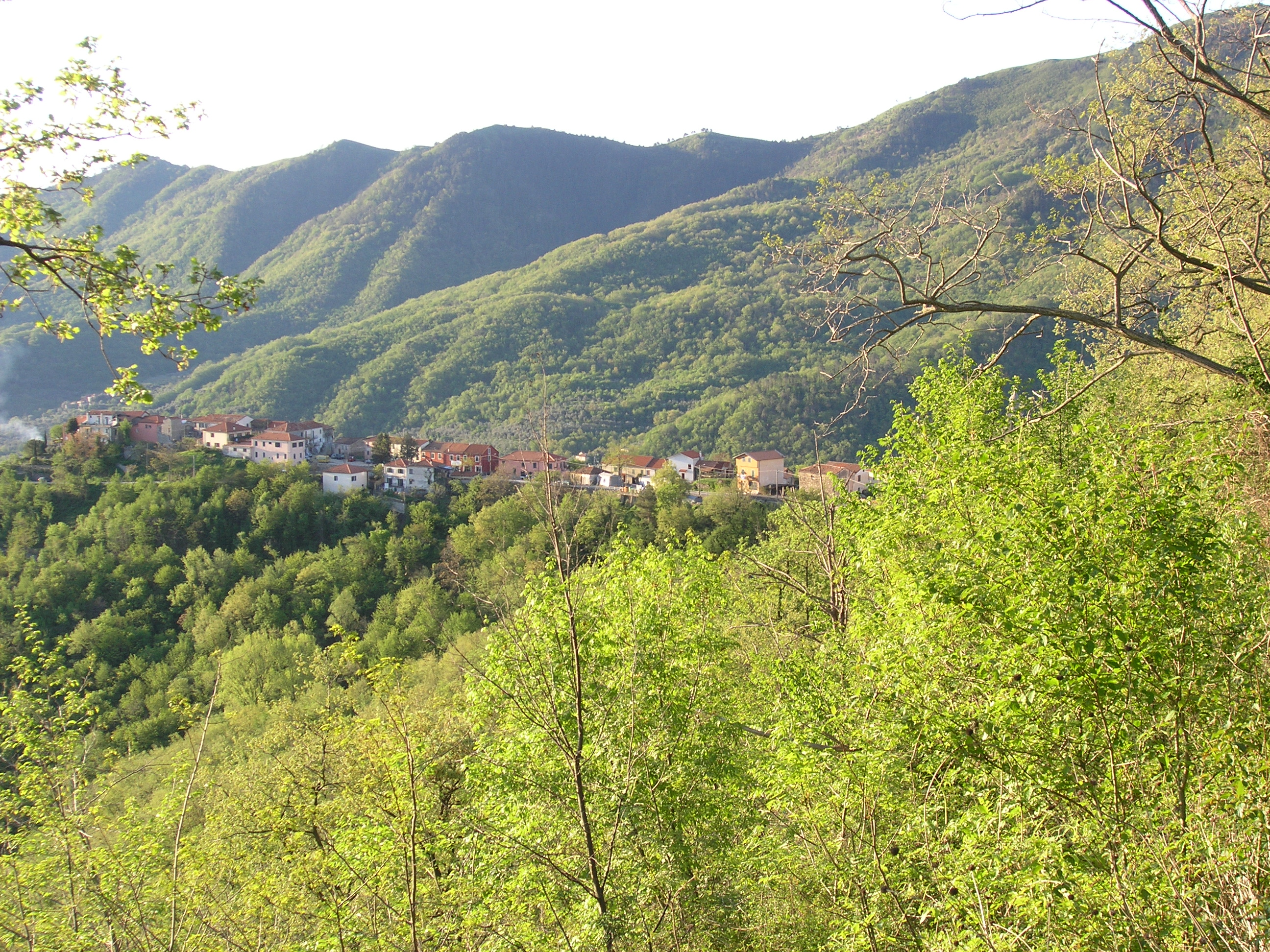

- Coat of arms

- Location within Italy Location within Liguria
- Coordinates: 44°0′N 8°2′E
- Country: Italy
- Region: Liguria
- Province: Province of Savona (SV)

Area
  - Total: 10.2 km^{2} (3.9 sq mi)
- Elevation: 470 m (1,540 ft)

Population (Dec. 2004)
  - Total: 217
  - Density: 21.3/km^{2} (55.1/sq mi)
- Time zone: UTC+1 (CET)
  - Summer (DST): UTC+2 (CEST)
- Postal code: 17020
- Dialing code: 0182

Testico (Ligurian: Testego) is a comune (municipality) in the Province of Savona in the Italian region Liguria, located about 90 kilometres (56 mi) southwest of Genoa and about 50 kilometres (31 mi) southwest of Savona. As of 31 December 2004, it had a population of 217 and an area of 10.2 square kilometres (3.9 mi^{2}).

Testico borders the following municipalities: Casanova Lerrone, Cesio, Chiusanico, and Stellanello.

== Demographic evolution ==
Historical population

Year	Pop.	±%
1861	576	—
1871	597	+3.6%
1881	575	−3.7%
1901	571	−0.7%
1911	498	−12.8%

Year	Pop.	±%
1921	516	+3.6%
1931	443	−14.1%
1936	431	−2.7%
1951	387	−10.2%
1961	346	−10.6%

Year	Pop.	±%
1971	251	−27.5%
1981	193	−23.1%
1991	202	+4.7%
2001	200	−1.0%

Source: Data from ISTAT
