= Andora =

Andora Andeua (Ligurian)
- Comune
- Comune di Andora
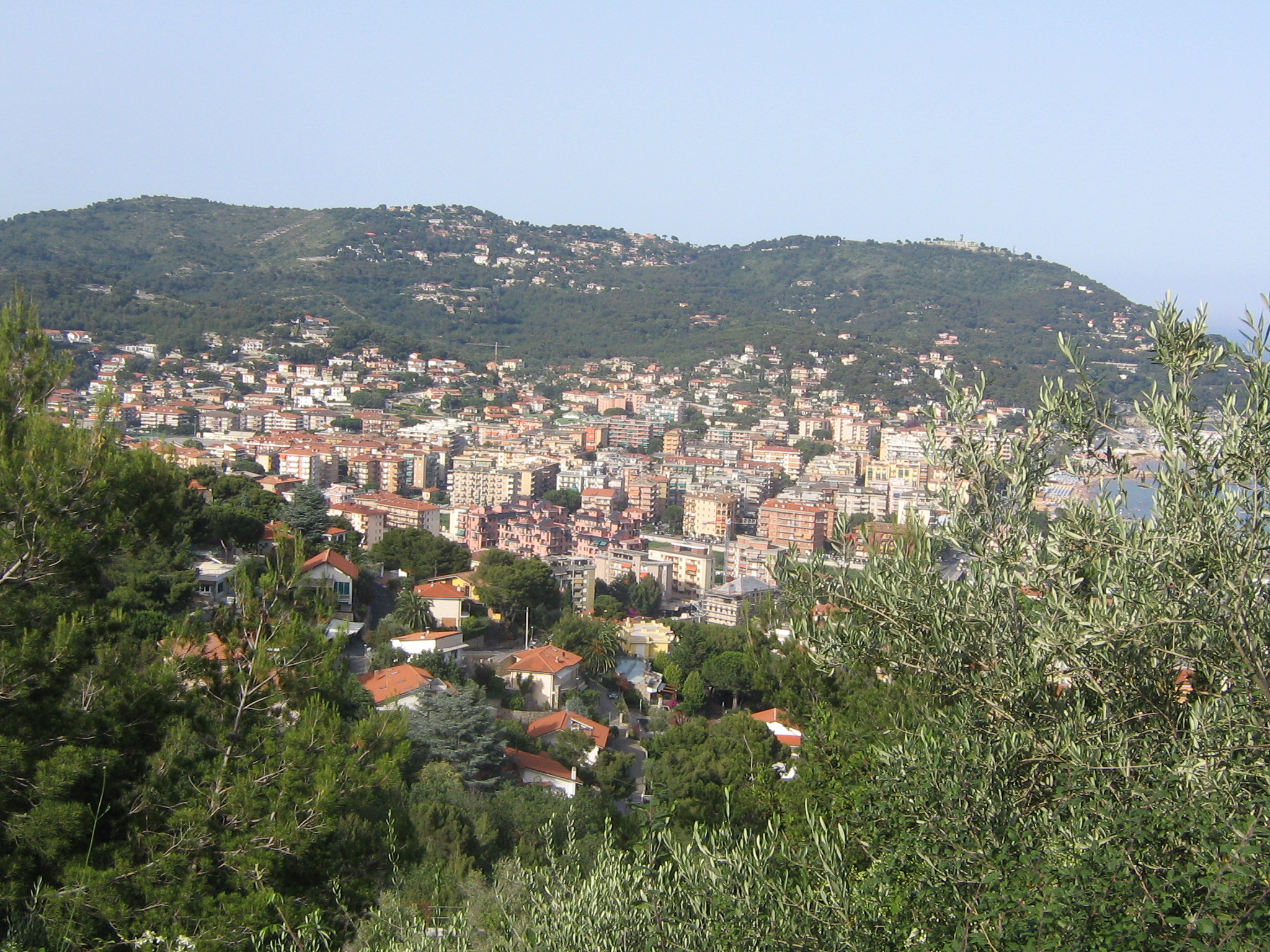
- Andora

- Coat of arms

- Location within Italy Location within Liguria
- Coordinates: 43°57′29.85″N 8°08′22.27″E
- Country: Italy
- Region: Liguria
- Province: Savona (SV)
- Frazioni: Conna, La Colla, Molino, Pinamare, Rollo, San Bartolomeo, San Giovanni

Government
  - Mayor: Demichelis Mauro (Andora più)

Area
  - Total: 31.61 km^{2} (12.20 sq mi)
- Elevation: 10 m (33 ft)

Population (31 December 2010)
  - Total: 7,657
  - Density: 242.2/km^{2} (627.4/sq mi)
- Demonym: Andoresi
- Time zone: UTC+1 (CET)
  - Summer (DST): UTC+2 (CEST)
- Postal code: 17051
- Dialing code: 0182
- Patron saint: St. James and Philip the Apostle
- Saint day: 3 May
- Website: Official website

Andora (Ligurian: Andeua) is a town on the Italian Riviera in the region of Liguria, included in the province of Savona.

== Geography and climate ==
Andora is situated in the western part of the Italian Riviera between Capo Mele in the east and Capo Mimosa in the west. This coastal area is called the Riviera delle Palme (Riviera of Palms), which is centered on Savona. To the west is the Riviera dei Fiore (Riviera of Flowers), which stretches from the French border to Cervo. Andora had a population of 7,638 in 2008 ISTAT date which swells to almost 10 times this in the summer months.

The original town is on a low hill by the left bank of the River Merula which flows into the sea. Marina di Andora is the development that spread along the coastline from the Middle Ages onwards, first as a fishing and boatbuilding center, then in the last 50 years as a tourist resort. It is 50.km from Savona, the main town in the province, 20 km from Imperia, 50 km from Sanremo and 90 km from Genoa. The territory forms part of the Mountain Community of Ingauna. Some of the parishes belonging to Andora include Conna, Colla Micheri, San Bartolomeo, San Pietro, Stellanello and Rollo.

Climate data for Capo Mele Lighthouse (1991-2020)
Month	Jan	Feb	Mar	Apr	May	Jun	Jul	Aug	Sep	Oct	Nov	Dec	Year
Record high °C (°F)	20.0 (68.0)	21.8 (71.2)	23.7 (74.7)	28.0 (82.4)	30.4 (86.7)	35.0 (95.0)	34.9 (94.8)	37.0 (98.6)	35.0 (95.0)	29.4 (84.9)	25.0 (77.0)	21.2 (70.2)	37.0 (98.6)
Mean daily maximum °C (°F)	12.1 (53.8)	12.6 (54.7)	14.8 (58.6)	17.2 (63.0)	21.0 (69.8)	24.7 (76.5)	27.7 (81.9)	28.3 (82.9)	24.9 (76.8)	20.4 (68.7)	16.1 (61.0)	13.1 (55.6)	19.4 (66.9)
Daily mean °C (°F)	9.0 (48.2)	9.1 (48.4)	11.2 (52.2)	13.6 (56.5)	17.4 (63.3)	21.0 (69.8)	23.9 (75.0)	24.4 (75.9)	21.1 (70.0)	17.0 (62.6)	13.0 (55.4)	10.1 (50.2)	15.9 (60.6)
Mean daily minimum °C (°F)	7.0 (44.6)	6.9 (44.4)	8.7 (47.7)	11.0 (51.8)	14.7 (58.5)	18.2 (64.8)	21.0 (69.8)	21.6 (70.9)	18.4 (65.1)	14.8 (58.6)	10.9 (51.6)	8.1 (46.6)	13.4 (56.2)
Average precipitation mm (inches)	57.7 (2.27)	42.8 (1.69)	47.4 (1.87)	64.9 (2.56)	38.6 (1.52)	26.1 (1.03)	13.5 (0.53)	18.8 (0.74)	67.9 (2.67)	99.1 (3.90)	117.8 (4.64)	82.9 (3.26)	677.5 (26.68)
Average precipitation days (≥ 1.0 mm)	5	4	5	6.3	4	3.03	1.93	2.03	5.7	6.3	8	5.93	57.22
Average relative humidity (%)	64.05	63.72	67.18	69.03	70.63	72.07	70.75	69.36	66.30	67.44	64.61	63.51	67.39
Average dew point °C (°F)	1.5 (34.7)	1.5 (34.7)	4.4 (39.9)	7.4 (45.3)	11.4 (52.5)	15.6 (60.1)	18.1 (64.6)	18.1 (64.6)	13.9 (57.0)	10.3 (50.5)	5.4 (41.7)	2.4 (36.3)	9.2 (48.5)
Mean monthly sunshine hours	170.2	171.1	210.2	217.2	254.2	270.6	302.6	287.1	231.3	188.5	162.0	164.0	2,629
Source: ncei.noaa.gov

== History ==
The first settlement here dates back to the 8th century BC with the Phocaeans escaping from Asia Minor. During the Roman Empire, Castrum Andorae underwent substantial development due to its strategic location on the Via Julia Augusta. After the invasion by the Goths in 951 it formed part of the Marca Alemanica and from 1091 passed to Bonifacio di Vasto. From 1125 the Clavesana family took over and constructed a defensive fortification, mainly to control the means of communication, and enhanced the town with towers, churches and town walls. Due to war, the family had to sell the territory and its castle in 1252 to the Republic of Genoa initiating a period of five centuries of peace. In this period olive trees were grown and olive oil was produced, fishing was practiced and boat building began. In 1671 the Virgin Mary appeared in Andora. At the end of the 18th century, the area became under the control of Napoleon Bonaparte in the new department of Montenotte. It later fell to the rule of Sardinia and then Italy.

From a population of 1,940 in 1861 it grew to 3,328 in 1961 to 6,068 in 1981 and by 2001 had reached 6,767.

== Main sights ==
There is a historical nucleus on a hill inland around the remains of the Clavesana Castle, which was once home to the governor of Genoa. Just opposite is the chapel of St Nicholas and ruins of some medieval houses. The church of St James and St. Phillip, which is based on the cathedral in Albenga, was built in local stone with columns and pillars in the late Romanesque style. A little further down the hill is the castle tower which was built between 1220 and 1240 and still remains intact.

A bridge on the River Merula with 10 arches is called the Roman Bridge but it was actually built in the Middle Ages on the site of a pre-existing older structure.

The San Giovanni Battista St. John the Baptist church, on the right bank of the river near the medieval bridge, dates back to the 15th century in the parish of the same name. The complex of old houses further up the hill, Borgata Confredi, was built to house the workers of the olive terraces nearby. From San Giovanni, you can still walk along the track of the mediaeval road to Cervo.

In the centre of Marina di Andora, you can still see the bastion built in the 11th century as a defence against the Saracens; it now houses a pizzeria.

On the way to Laigueglia is the Capo Mele Lighthouse. From Cervo, the main site of Andora is the St.James Church. From Cervo, there are views of the church and the whole city. A bridge on the Merule River reaches San Giovanni town which is the most historical city of Andora.

== Tourism and recreation ==
Andora is a holiday resort thanks to the long sandy beach and the historical hinterland. Since 1986 Andora has held the Bandiera Blu award for clean waters and beaches. Accommodations include hotels, bed and breakfast establishments and campsites. There are public and private lidos offering services such as sunbed, hire, etc. Various water sports are practiced including sailing, canoeing, surfing, kite surfing and windsurfing. A diving club Sport 7 is based in the marina and the sailing and canoeing club is to the east of the port.

It has a marina with over 850 moorings, mainly for local boat owners, but 56 places are reserved for tourists in transit to the area. Whale-watching trips depart in the summer from the marina. Apart from water sports, there are bowling clubs, tennis clubs and horse riding stables at San Pietro. The area is popular for hiking and mountain biking. The Parco delle Farfalle has a roller skating rink and there is a cycling velodrome in the center.

Concerts are held in the summer in the outdoor arena at the Parco Delle Farfalle as well, in the town center and in the historic setting of the medieval St James and St Phillip Church. There is also an open-air cinema in the summer months.

== Events ==
Azzurro pesce d'autore (author blue fish) in May is a two-day gastronomic festival celebrating Andora and its commercial activity through two aspects of its territory: the earth and the sea.

The festival of St. Rita is on 22 May in the Piazza Santa Rita (St. Rita's Square) near the sea. Roses are blessed in the chapel dedicated to the saint. It is followed closely by the locals who have a strong religious beliefs in her.

The festival of St John the Baptist on 24 June is marked by religious festivities and a sagra, a gathering of the local people in the grounds of the church with an outdoor food and wine festival to raise funds for the local community.

The Beer Festival at the end of June attracts visitors coming from the north of Italy with live music and a disco in the outdoor arena near the beach.

Several regattas for various categories of sailing craft mainly in the summer months.

Rollo hosts a Festival of Aromatic Herbs for a weekend at the end of June.

== Economy ==
The main economic activity of Andora is based on beach tourism thanks to it having one of the largest stretches of sandy beach in the western Italian Riviera. In the summer the population reaches 70,000 due to the numerous villas and holiday homes. Most visitors come from Piedmont, Lombardy and the Aosta Valley as well as from overseas.

It also is an agricultural town with fields of basil grown to make the world-famous pesto sauce, fruits, vegetables, olives for oil and vineyards.

== Transport ==
Andora is on the coast road the Via Aurelia. There is an exit for Andora on the A10 motorway between Ventimiglia and Genoa.

There is a railway station on the Genoa–Ventimiglia line.

There are buses to Sanremo in the west, and to Finale Ligure in the east.

The nearest airports are Genoa GOA Cristoforo Colombo and Nice NCE Côte d’Azur.

== Twin towns – sister cities ==
Andora is twinned with:

- Larvik, Norway (2006)

== See also ==
- Liguria wine
