= Borghetto d'Arroscia =

- Comune
- Comune di Borghetto d'Arroscia
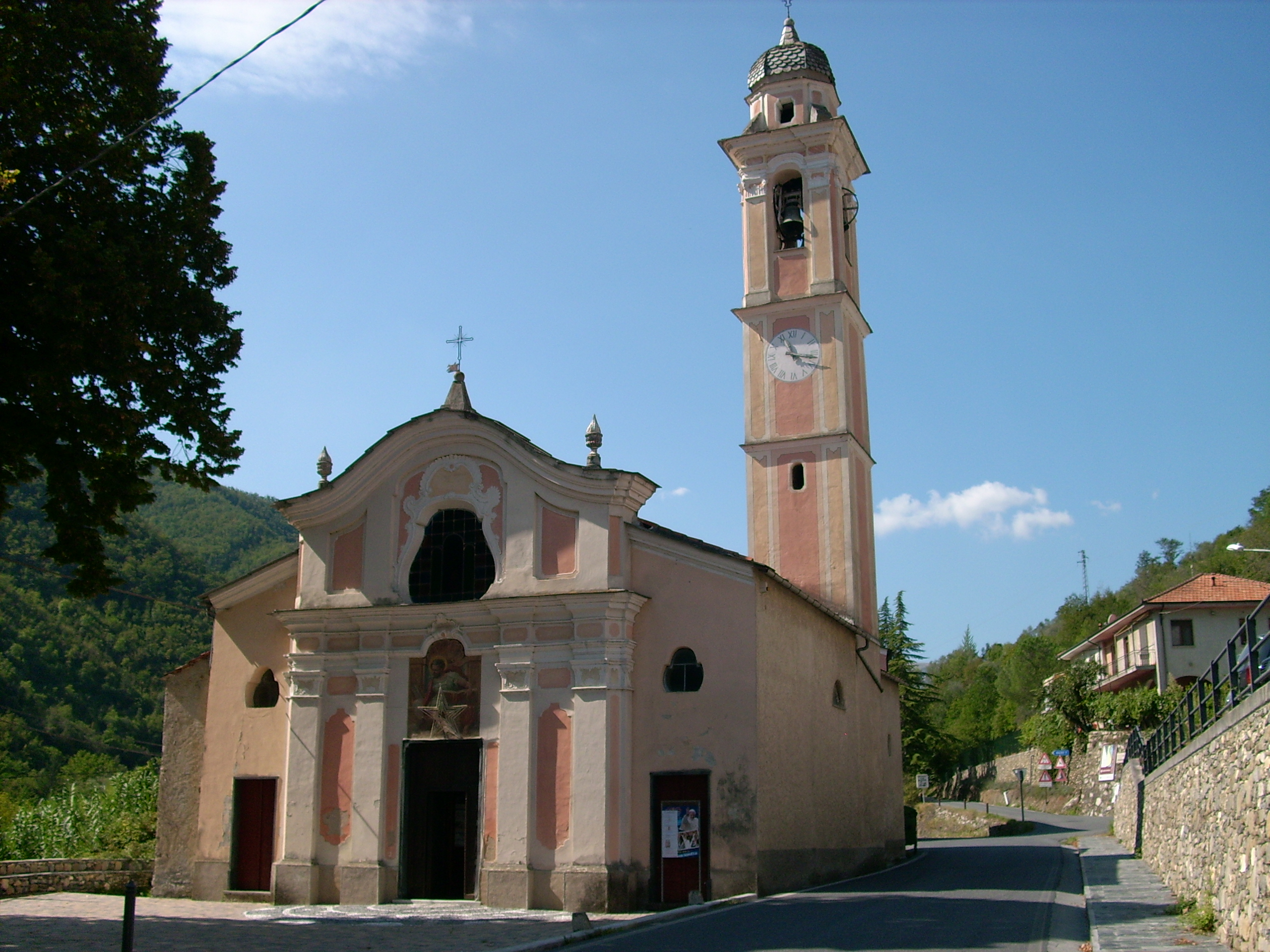
- Church in Borghetto d'Arroscia

- Location within Italy Location within Liguria
- Coordinates: 44°3′N 7°59′E
- Country: Italy
- Region: Liguria
- Province: Province of Imperia (IM)
- Frazioni: Gavenola, Gazzo, Leverone, Montecalvo, Ubaga, Ubaghetta

Area Luca Ronco
  - Total: 25.95 km^{2} (10.02 sq mi)
- Elevation: 155 m (509 ft)

Population (30 April 2017)
  - Total: 455
  - Density: 17.5/km^{2} (45.4/sq mi)
- Demonym: Borghettini
- Time zone: UTC+1 (CET)
  - Summer (DST): UTC+2 (CEST)
- Postal code: 18020
- Dialing code: 0183
- Website: Official website

Borghetto d'Arroscia (Ligurian: O Borghetto d'Areuscia, locally Burghettu) is a comune (municipality) in the Province of Imperia in the Italian region Liguria, located about 90 kilometres (56 mi) southwest of Genoa and about 20 kilometres (12 mi) north of Imperia.

Borghetto d'Arroscia borders the following municipalities: Aquila di Arroscia, Caprauna, Casanova Lerrone, Pieve di Teco, Ranzo, and Vessalico. It gets its name from the Arroscia, a large creek flowing down from Ligurian Alps.
