= Armo =

- Comune
- Comune di Armo
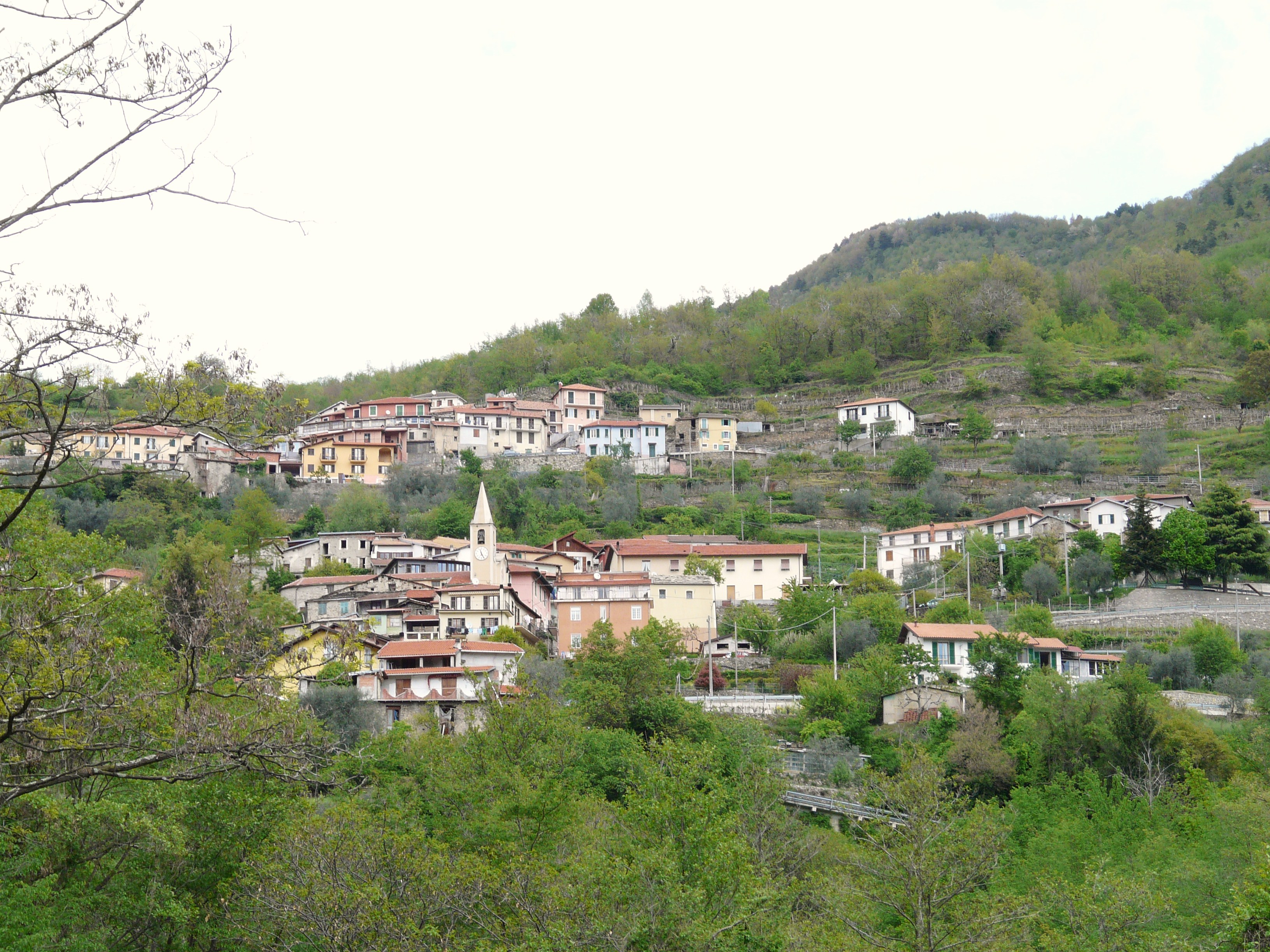
- View of Armo

- Location within Italy Location within Liguria
- Coordinates: 44°5′N 7°55′E
- Country: Italy
- Region: Liguria
- Province: Imperia (IM)
- Frazioni: Trastanello

Government
  - Mayor: Maura Barbera

Area
  - Total: 9.3 km^{2} (3.6 sq mi)

Population (31 December 2005)
  - Total: 122
  - Density: 13/km^{2} (34/sq mi)
- Demonym: Armensi
- Time zone: UTC+1 (CET)
  - Summer (DST): UTC+2 (CEST)
- Postal code: 18026
- Dialing code: 0183

Armo is a comune (municipality) in the Province of Imperia in the Italian region Liguria, located about 90 kilometres (56 mi) southwest of Genoa and about 25 kilometres (16 mi) northwest of Imperia.

Armo borders the following municipalities: Caprauna, Ormea, Pieve di Teco, and Pornassio.

== See also ==
- Rocca delle Penne
