= Mario Magnotta =

Italian janitor (1942–2009)

- Born: 14 October 1942; Pieve di Teco, Italy
- Died: 4 January 2009 (aged 66); L'Aquila, Italy
- Occupation: School janitor
- Known for: Internet celebrity

Mario Magnotta (14 October 1942 – 4 January 2009) was an Italian janitor of a commercial school in L'Aquila, Abruzzo. He became very well known in Italy after being the victim of several prank calls, made in 1986 and 1987 by some former students of the institute, which were later circulated on audio cassettes and, eventually, on the Internet.

== Biography ==
Born in Pieve di Teco, in the province of Imperia, Liguria, Magnotta was the son of Giovanni Magnotta and Romilda Siconolfi, who moved the family to L'Aquila in 1945 because of work.

== Prank calls ==
Magnotta was already famous before the Internet, by word of mouth and through the duplication and the sharing of audio cassettes. Over time Magnotta's fame spread all over Italy. Years after the 1986 to 1987 calls, the recordings were digitized and posted to the internet, which elevated his fame even more. The success on the website was principally due to the rage and the use of blasphemies by Magnotta, and to his "Aquilano dialect", the most important variant of Sabino dialect, considered the standard form of it and which sounds very amusing to internauts. The phone jokes had three topics:

- Two fake calls from Telefono Azzurro (an Italian association for the protection of children) regarding his daughter and his (made-up) homosexual relationship with one of his co-workers.
- Some calls from Mr. Bruno, who pretended to be the new partner of his former wife, asking him for money to maintain her.
- The most famous prank was about a washing machine Mario Magnotta had actually bought in 1981. A fake seller, Mr. Bontempi, asked him, 6 years after the sale, to pay an installment of ITL 480,000. This and other calls from other subjects (one impersonating a manager of the Sangiorgio Elettrodomestici of Milan, an Italian electric appliances manufacturer) made him think he was being framed in a fraud on the company by Mr. Bontempi. In the last of his calls, Magnotta, in a burst of rage, tells Bontempi the most well-known (and unintentionally funny) quote: «Mi iscrivo ai terroristi porco Dio!» ("I'll sign up to the terrorists" – followed by "Porco Dio", a typical Italian profanity meaning, literally, "Pig God").

== The fame ==
Even before the creation of the web site (www.magnotta.it), he was invited twice to talk-shows on Italian television RAI, and suddenly invited to some local events dedicated to him. During a concert of Antonello Venditti in L'Aquila, Magnotta was invited on the scene by the singer, who was curious to know him. The Italian singer Simone Cristicchi, winner of the 2007 edition of Sanremo Music Festival, dedicated to him a verse of his song "L'Italia di Piero" ("The Italy of Piero"): «Piero non rinuncerebbe mai alla lotta, e si iscrive ai terroristi come fa il Magnotta» («Piero would never give up combat, and he "signs up to the terrorists" like Magnotta did»).

== Death ==
Magnotta died in January 2009 in L'Aquila of a pulmonary embolism. In 2012, the municipal council of L'Aquila decided to dedicate a city street to him; it is not done yet.

== See also ==
- List of Internet phenomena
