= Pornassio =

Pornassio Purnasce
- Comune
- Comune di Pornassio
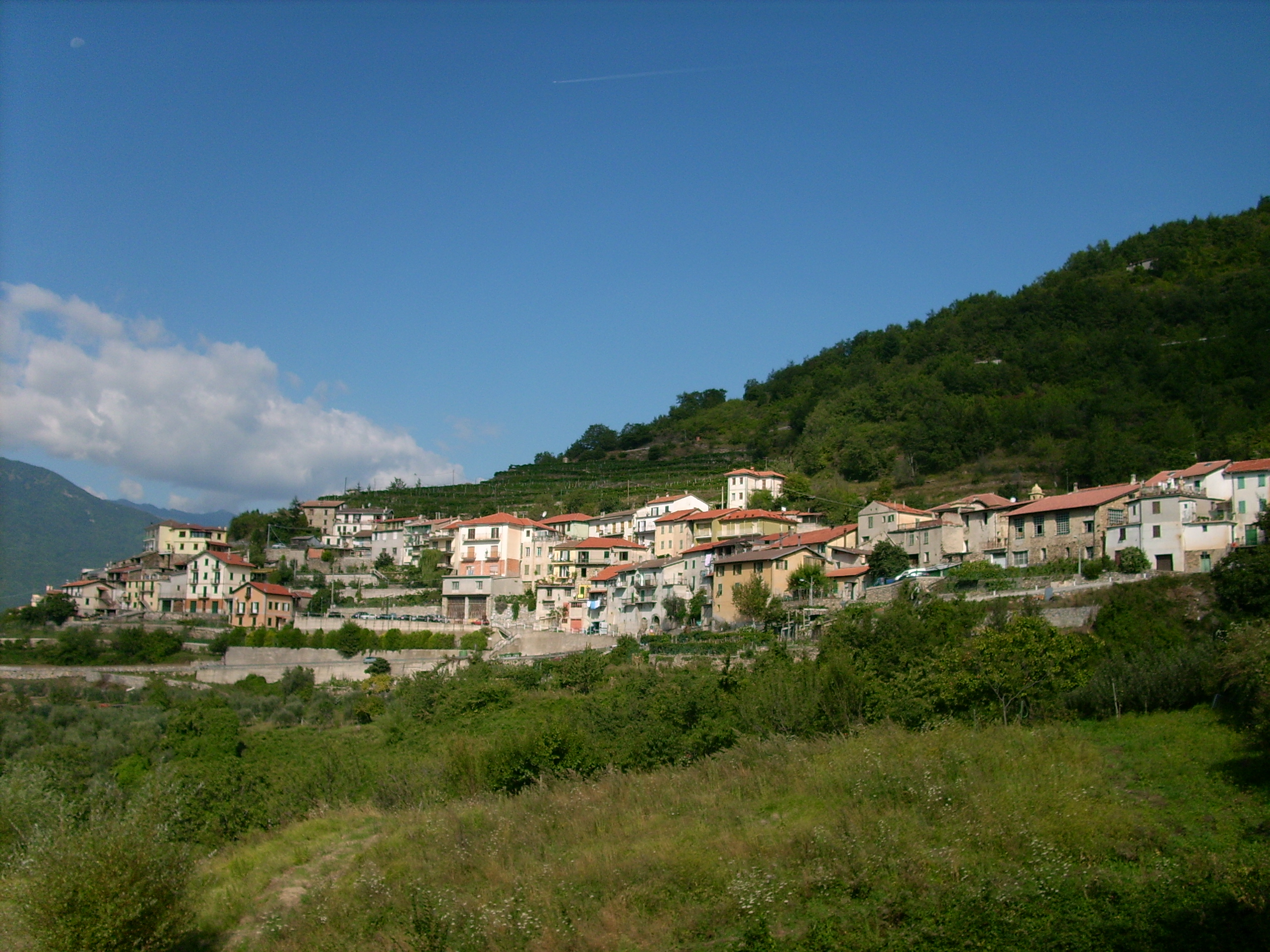
- View of Pornassio

- Location within Italy Location within Liguria
- Coordinates: 44°4′N 7°52′E
- Country: Italy
- Region: Liguria
- Province: Province of Imperia (IM)

Area
  - Total: 27.7 km^{2} (10.7 sq mi)

Population (Dec. 2004)
  - Total: 642
  - Density: 23.2/km^{2} (60.0/sq mi)
- Time zone: UTC+1 (CET)
  - Summer (DST): UTC+2 (CEST)
- Postal code: 18020
- Dialing code: 0183

Pornassio (Ligurian: Purnasce) is a comune (municipality) in the Province of Imperia in the Italian region Liguria, located about 90 kilometres (56 mi) southwest of Genoa and about 25 kilometres (16 mi) northwest of Imperia. As of 31 December 2004, it had a population of 642 and an area of 27.7 square kilometres (10.7 mi^{2}).

Pornassio borders the following municipalities: Armo, Cosio di Arroscia, Montegrosso Pian Latte, Ormea, Pieve di Teco, and Rezzo.

== Demographic evolution ==
Historical population

Year	Pop.	±%
1861	1,380	—
1871	1,359	−1.5%
1881	1,344	−1.1%
1901	1,381	+2.8%
1911	1,346	−2.5%

Year	Pop.	±%
1921	1,266	−5.9%
1931	1,409	+11.3%
1936	1,158	−17.8%
1951	1,075	−7.2%
1961	931	−13.4%

Year	Pop.	±%
1971	807	−13.3%
1981	694	−14.0%
1991	635	−8.5%
2001	651	+2.5%

Source: Data from ISTAT
