= Laigueglia =

Laigueglia L'Aigheuja (Ligurian)
- Comune
- Comune di Laigueglia
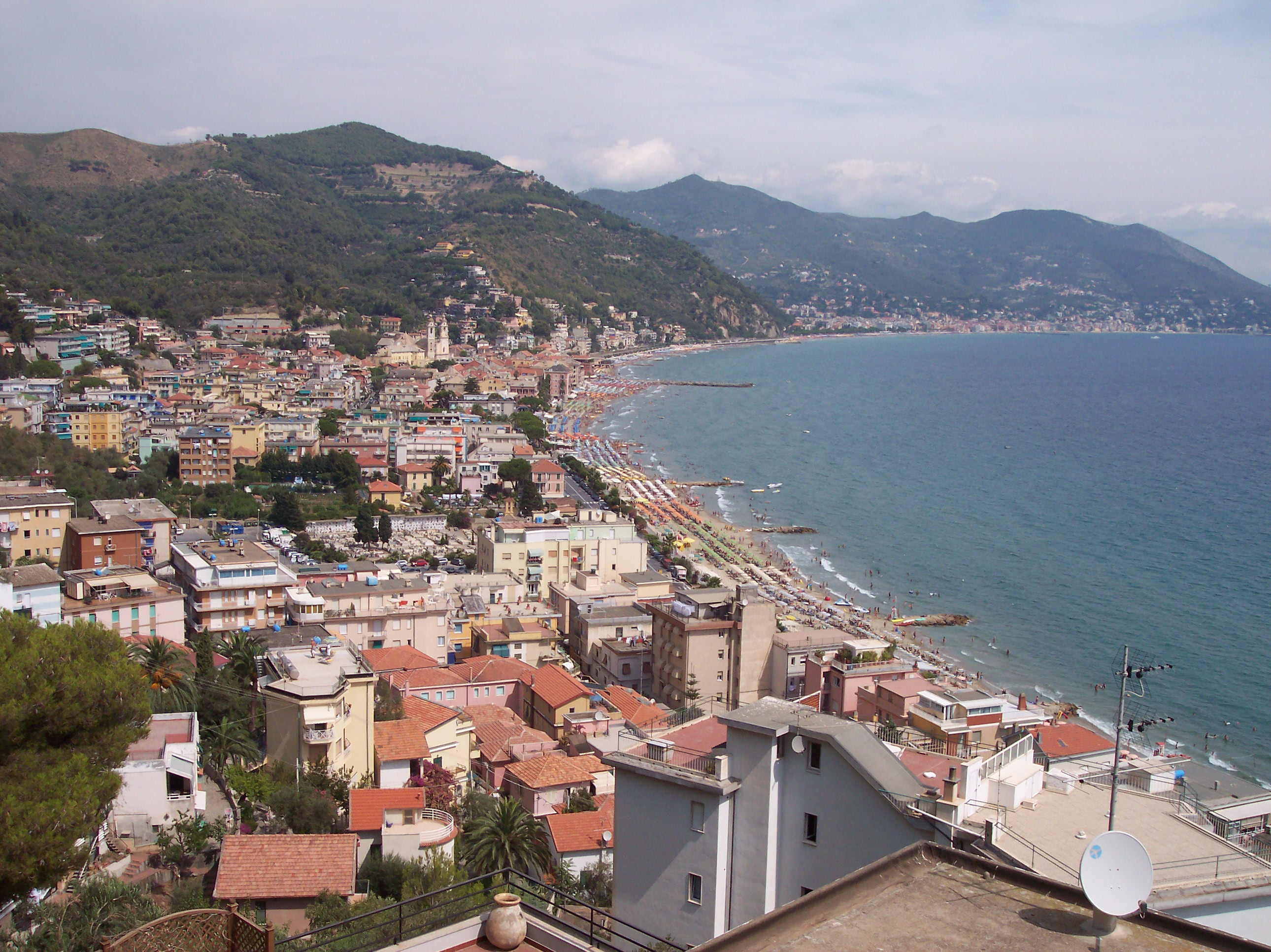
- Laigueglia

- Coat of arms

- Location within Italy Location within Liguria
- Coordinates: 43°58′N 08°10′E
- Country: Italy
- Region: Liguria
- Province: Savona

Government
  - Mayor: Roberto Sasso Dal Verme

Area
  - Total: 2 km^{2} (0.77 sq mi)

Population (31 December 2010)
  - Total: 1,895
  - Density: 950/km^{2} (2,500/sq mi)
- Demonym: Laiguegliesi
- Time zone: UTC+1 (CET)
  - Summer (DST): UTC+2 (CEST)
- Postal code: 17053
- Dialing code: 0182
- Patron saint: St. Matthew
- Saint day: September 21
- Website: Official website

Laigueglia (Italian: [laiˈɡweʎʎa]; Ligurian: L'Aigheuja, IPA: [lei̯ˈɡøjja]) is a town and comune in the province of Savona, in Liguria, nearby the Capo Mele Lighthouse. It is one of I Borghi più belli d'Italia ("The most beautiful villages of Italy").

== International relations ==
=== Twin towns – Sister cities ===
Laigueglia is twinned with:

- Höhr-Grenzhausen, Germany (since 1972)
- Semur-en-Auxois, France (since 2000)
- La Thuile, Italy (since 2013)

Aerial view of Laigueglia in the 1970s

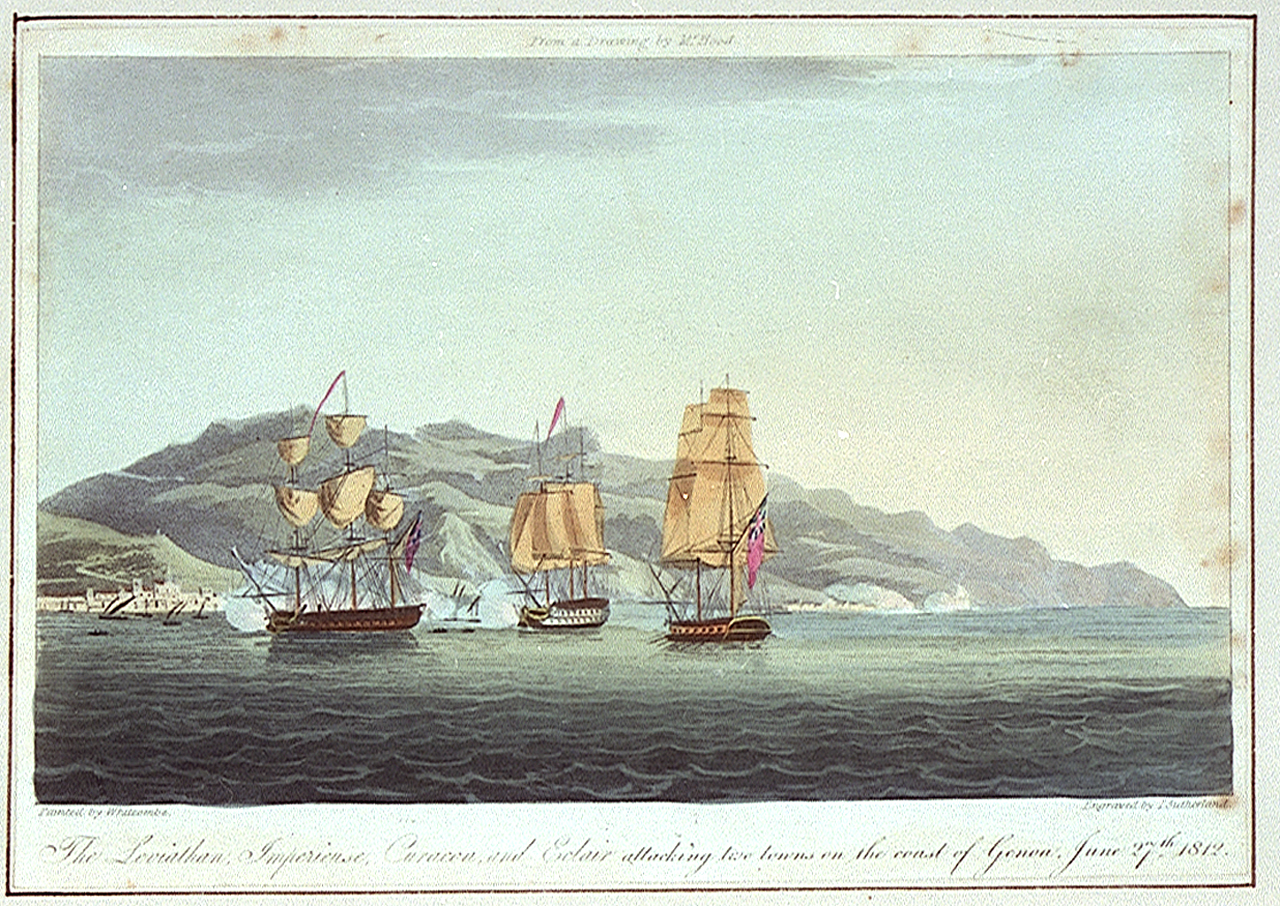
British Navy attack a convoy of eighteen French merchant ships at Laigrelia
