= Garlenda =

- Comune
- Comune di Garlenda
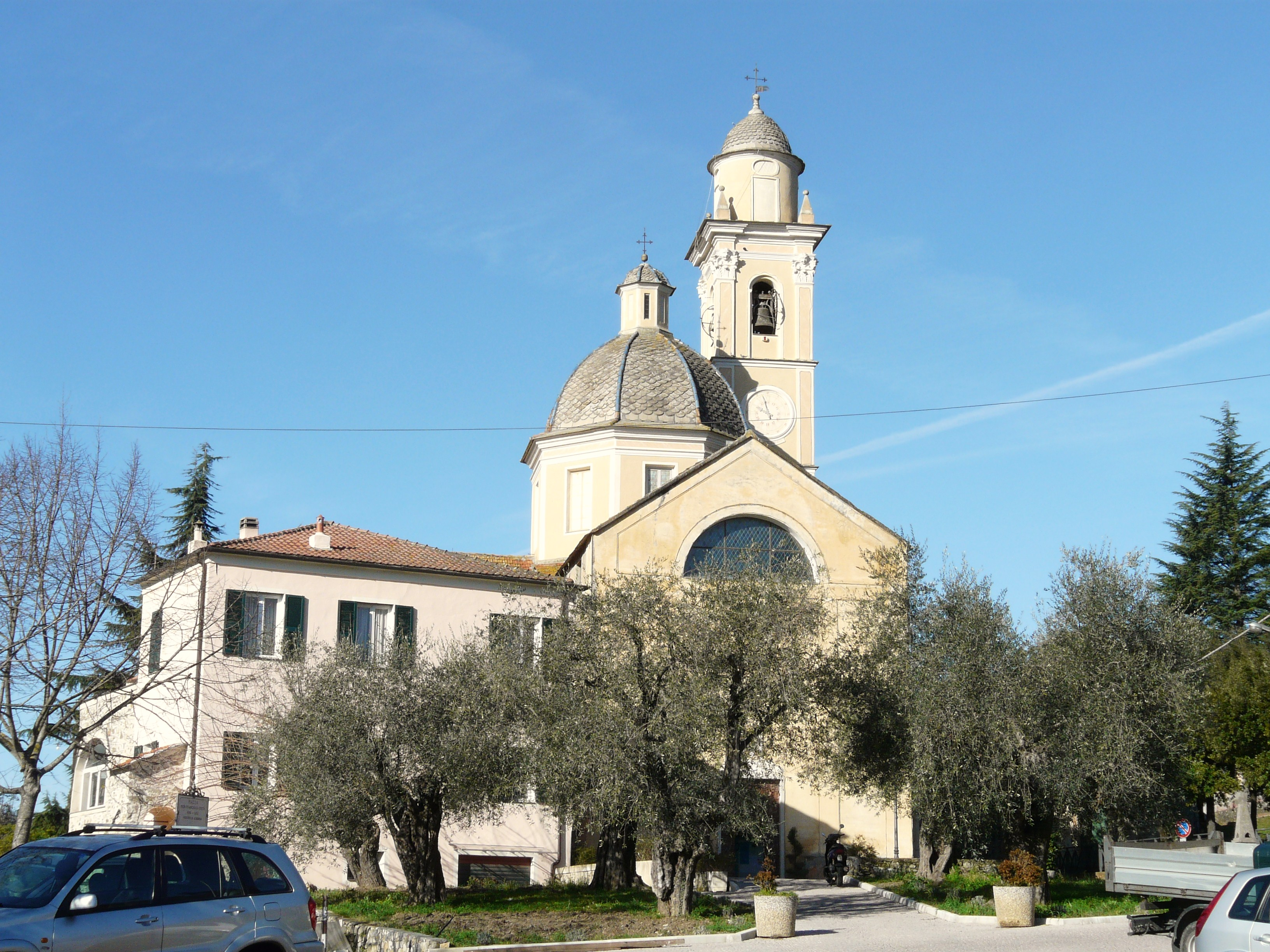
- Church of the Nativity

- Coat of arms

- Location within Italy Location within Liguria
- Coordinates: 44°2′N 8°6′E
- Country: Italy
- Region: Liguria
- Province: Savona (SV)
- Frazioni: Castelli, Paravenna

Government
  - Mayor: Silvia Pittoli

Area
  - Total: 8.03 km^{2} (3.10 sq mi)
- Elevation: 75 m (246 ft)

Population (31 August 2017)
  - Total: 1,270
  - Density: 158/km^{2} (410/sq mi)
- Demonym: Garlendesi
- Time zone: UTC+1 (CET)
  - Summer (DST): UTC+2 (CEST)
- Postal code: 17033
- Dialing code: 0182
- Website: Official website

Garlenda is a comune (municipality) in the Province of Savona in the Italian region Liguria, located about 80 kilometres (50 mi) southwest of Genoa and about 45 kilometres (28 mi) southwest of Savona.

It bordered to the north by the municipality of Villanova d'Albenga, on the south by Stellanello Andora and, to the west with Casanova Lerrone and east Villanova d'Albenga .
