= Girolamo Grimaldi (1674–1733) =

- Cardinal-Priest of Santa Balbina
- Church: Catholic Church
- See: Santa Balbina
- In office: 3 September 1731 – 18 November 1733
- Predecessor: Antonio Felice Zondadari
- Successor: Thomas Philip Wallrad de Hénin-Liétard d'Alsace
- Previous posts: Apostolic Nuncio to the Emperor (1720-1731); Titular Archbishop of Edessa in Osrhoëne (1712-1731); Apostolic Nuncio to Poland (1712-1721); Apostolic Internuncio to Belgium (1706-1713)

Orders
- Ordination: 7 April 1709
- Consecration: 9 April 1713 by Philips Erard van der Noot
- Created cardinal: 2 October 1730 by Pope Clement XII

Personal details
- Born: 15 November 1674 Genoa, Republic of Genoa
- Died: 18 November 1733 (aged 59) Ischia, Kingdom of Naples, Habsburg Empire

Girolamo Grimaldi (1674 – 18 November 1733) was a cardinal who worked in the diplomatic service of the Holy See and in the government of the Papal States.

== Life and death ==
Baptized in Genoa on 15 November 1674, Grimaldi graduated from the University of Avignon on 26 June 1705 with a law degree. Four years later, he was ordained as a Roman Catholic priest, on 7 April 1709, and was appointed Internuncio to Brussels.

On 5 October 1712 he was appointed titular Archbishop of Edessa in Osrhoëne and sent as Nuncio to Poland. In 1720 he became Nuncio to Austria

Ten years later, he was created a cardinal in the consistory of 2 October 1730 and appointed the papal legate for Bologna. In the following year 1731 he became Legate for the duchies of Parma and Piacenza.

In 1733, while travelling by sea from Naples to Genoa, he became ill. He was taken ashore at Ischia and died there on 18 November 1733. His body was taken to Genoa and buried in the church of San Filippo.
