= Vessalico =

Vessalico Vesarco
- Comune
- Comune di Vessalico
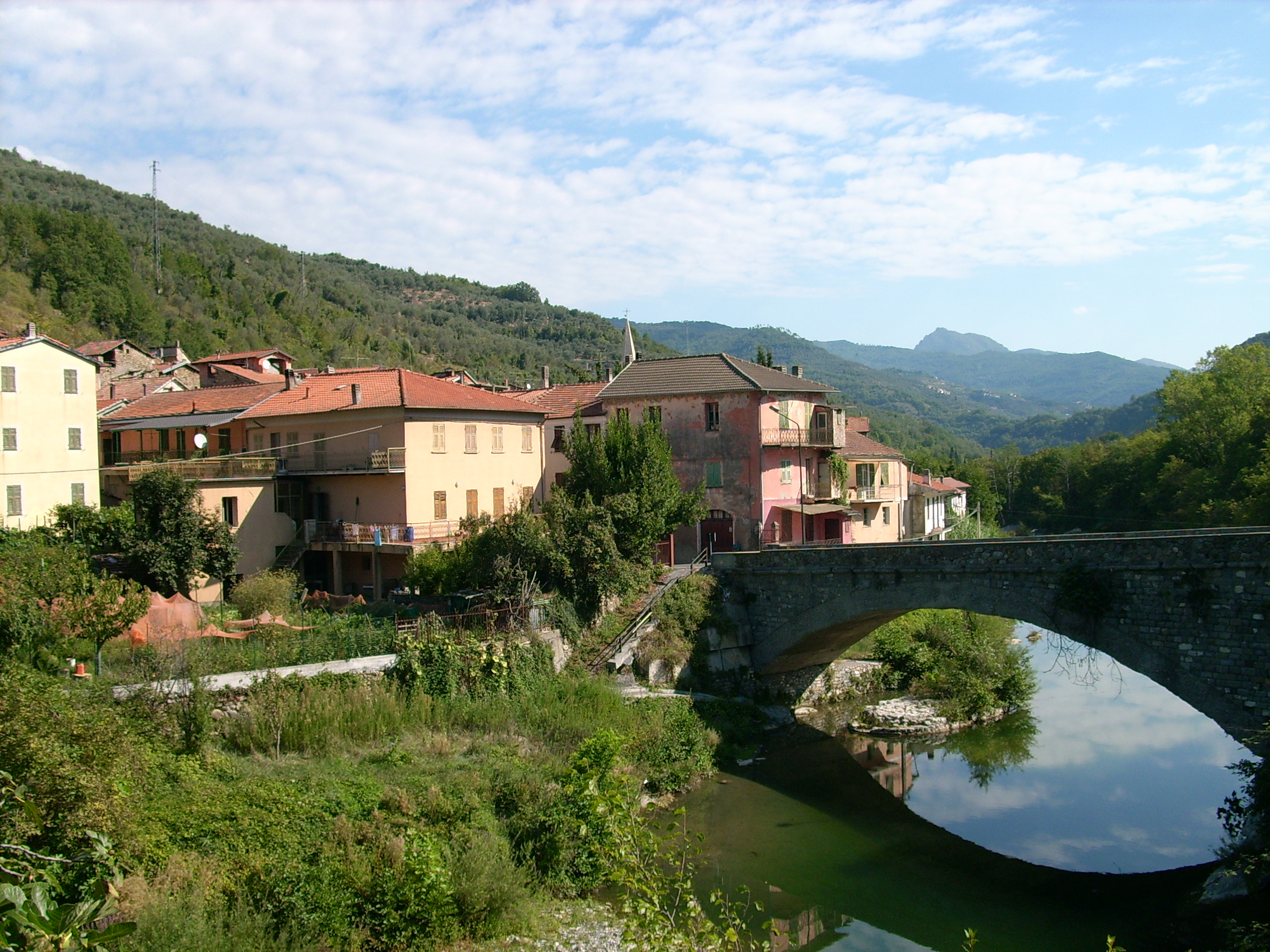
- View of Vessalico

- Location within Italy Location within Liguria
- Coordinates: 44°3′N 7°58′E
- Country: Italy
- Region: Liguria
- Province: Imperia (IM)

Government
  - Mayor: Paola Giliberti

Area
  - Total: 10.47 km^{2} (4.04 sq mi)
- Elevation: 197 m (646 ft)

Population (31 December 215)
  - Total: 282
  - Density: 26.9/km^{2} (69.8/sq mi)
- Demonym: Vasselcesi
- Time zone: UTC+1 (CET)
  - Summer (DST): UTC+2 (CEST)
- Postal code: 18020
- Dialing code: 0183
- Website: Official website

Vessalico (Ligurian: Vesarco) is a comune (municipality) in the Province of Imperia in the Italian region Liguria, located about 90 kilometres (56 mi) southwest of Genoa and about 20 kilometres (12 mi) northwest of Imperia.

Vessalico borders the following municipalities: Borghetto d'Arroscia, Casanova Lerrone, Cesio, and Pieve di Teco.
