= Girolamo Grimaldi (died 1543) =

Cardinal and senator of Genoa, died 1543

Orders
- Created cardinal: 21 November 1527

Personal details
- Died: 1543

Girolamo Grimaldi (died 27 November 1543) was a member of the House of Grimaldi. He was a senator of the Republic of Genoa and, later, a cardinal.

== Early life ==
He was the son of Benedetto Grimaldi and Pellegra Sauli. His date of birth is unknown but was probably towards the end of the 15th century. Grimaldi was a Senator of the Republic of Genoa. He married Francisca Cattaneo of Genoa, with whom he had five children.

== Cardinal ==
After his wife's death, Grimaldi entered the clergy of the Roman Catholic Church, and was appointed a cardinal in the consistory of 21 November 1527, taking possession of this titular church of San Giorgio in Velabro on 27 April 1528.

From 1528 until 1535 he was the episcopal administrator of the Diocese of Brugnato. He was papal legate to Genoa in 1530 and between 1530 and 1540 Administrator of the metropolitan diocese of Bari. From 1538 until his death he was administrator of the diocese of Albenga and Legate in Romandiola. He died in Genoa on 27 November 1543, and was buried there.
