= Monte Alpe =

Mountain in Italy

- La Rocca, Monte Alpe Est
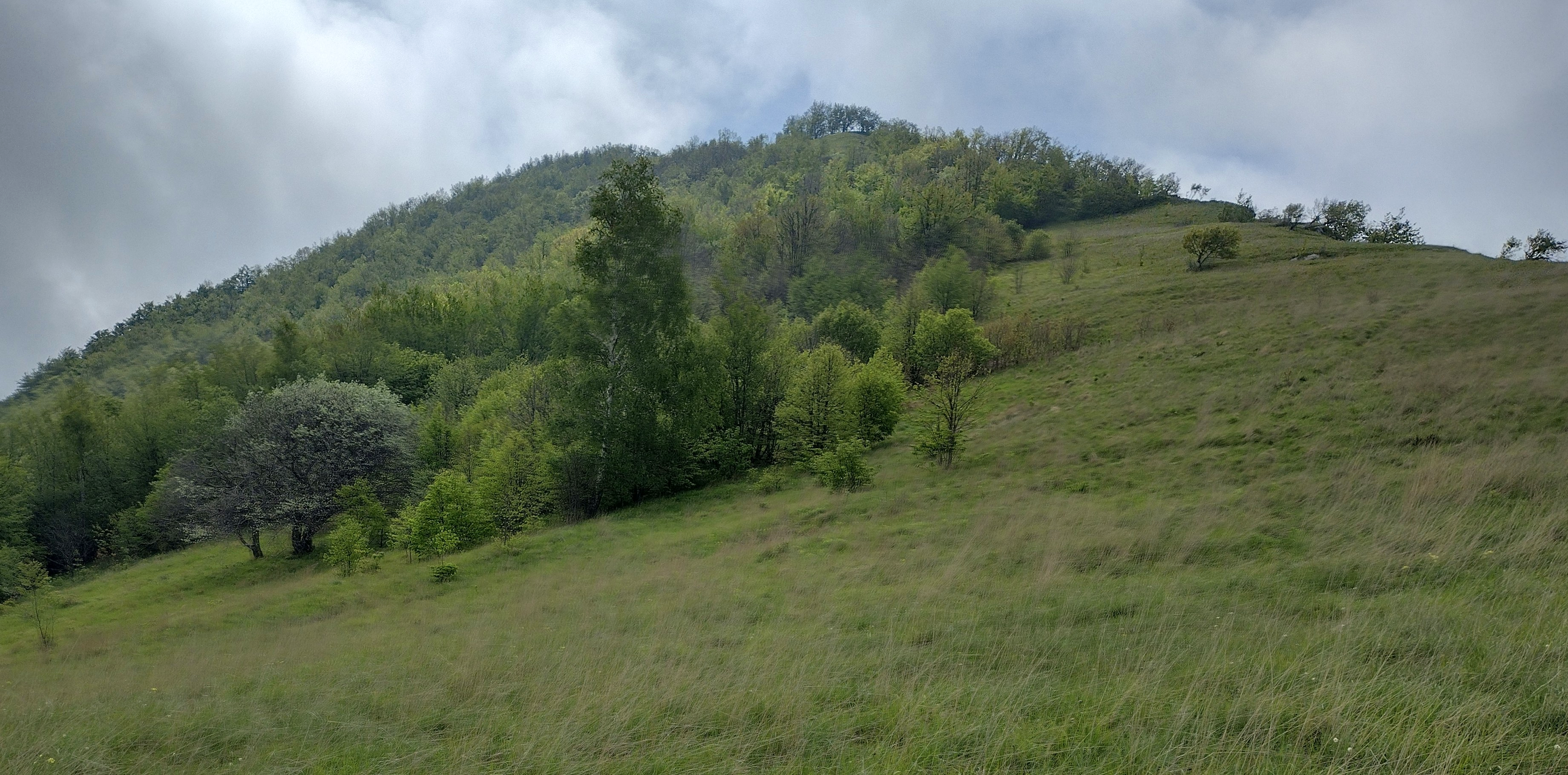
- View from Sella d'Alpe

Highest point
- Elevation: 1,056 m (3,465 ft)
- Prominence: 151 m (495 ft)
- Coordinates: 44°07′31″N 8°05′15″E

Geography
- Location within Alps
- Location: Liguria, Italy
- Parent range: Ligurian Alps

Climbing
- First ascent: ancestral
- Easiest route: footpath from Erli

The Monte Alpe (or La Rocca, or Monte Alpe Est, 1.056 m) is a mountain of the Ligurian Prealps, the eastern section of the Ligurian Alps.

== Features ==
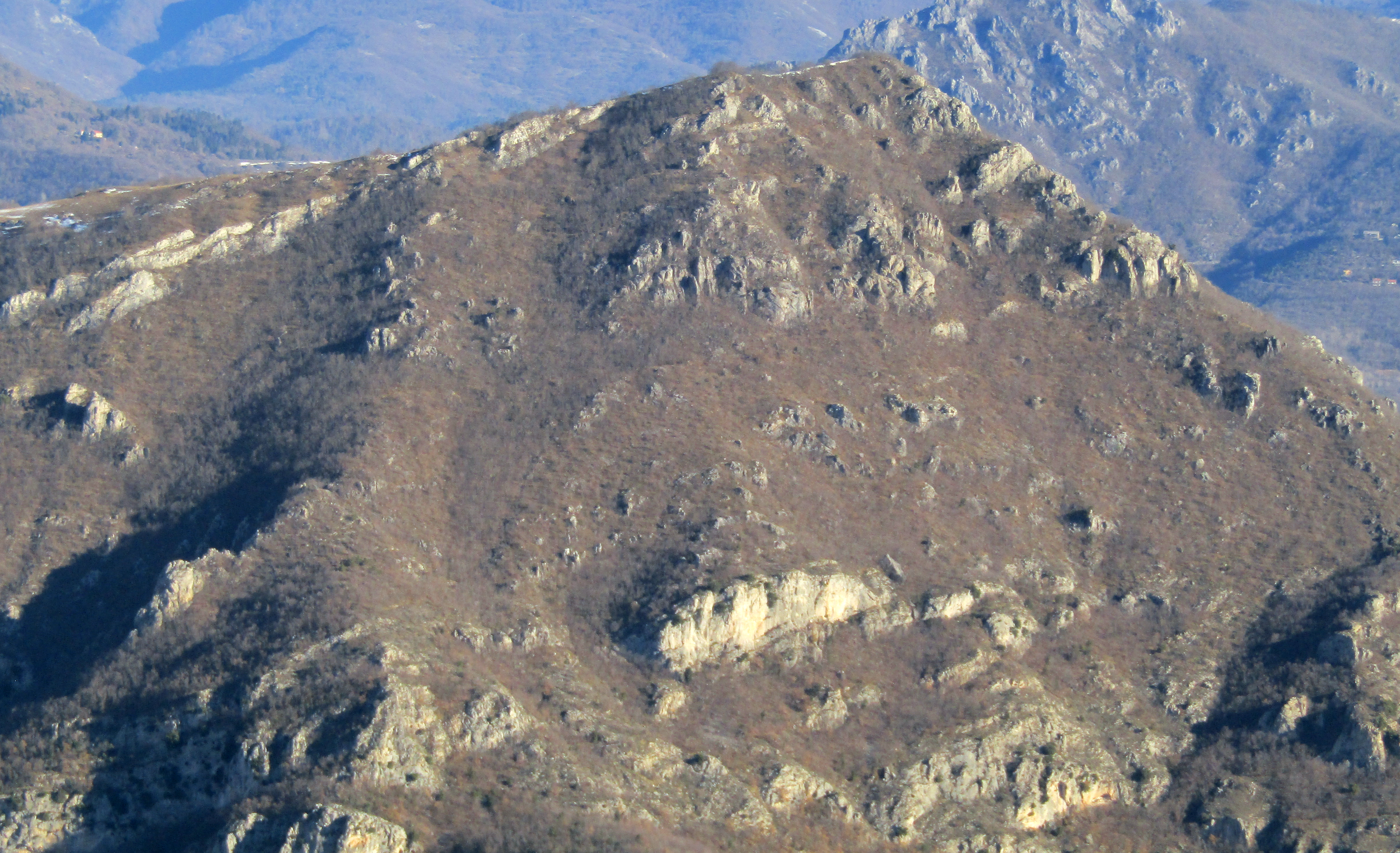
View from Monte Peso Grande

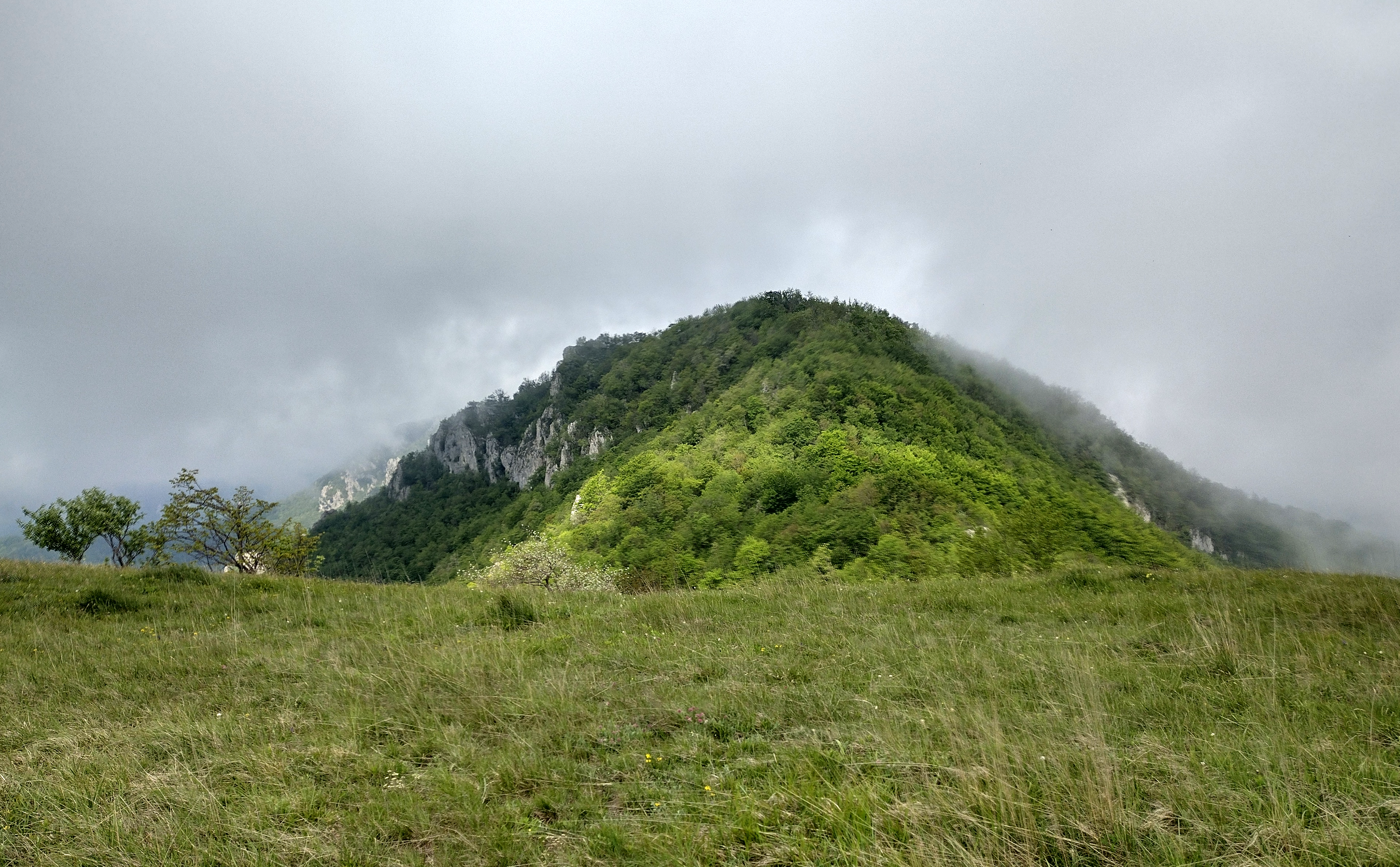
The W summit as seen from the Sella d'Alpe

The mountain stands between the comunes of Castelbianco and Erli, both in the provincia di Savona (Italy). It belongs to the Pennavaira/Neva; its prominence is of 151 metres. The Sella d'Alpe (938 m) divides the main summit of Monte Alpe, at an elevation of 1056 m, from a W summit at 1035 m. NW of this elevation the Neva/Pennavaira ridge goes on with Monte delle Gettine and Pizzo Castellino and, after the saddle of Passo delle Caranche, meets the main chain of the Alps at Monte Galero. Towards SE the ridge quickly drops, ending up close to the village of Marinetto, at the connfluence between the two rivers.

The summit of Monte Alpe is marked by a small cairn. The mountain is shrouded by thick woods which, both close to its main elevation and the W summit, leave places to grassland. On the Monte Alpe flanks there are several rock outcrops, some of them very steep or vertical and used by enthusiasts as a climbing area. The lower slopes of the mountain are occupied by olive trees plantations and by other Mediterranean cultivations.

=== SOIUSA classification ===
According to the SOIUSA (International Standardized Mountain Subdivision of the Alps) the mountain can be classified in the following way:

- main part = Western Alps; major sector = South Western Alps, section = Ligurian Alps, subsection = Prealpi Liguri
- supergroup = Catena Settepani-Carmo-Armetta, group = Gruppo Galero-Armetta, subgroup = Dorsale del Pizzo Castellino, code = I/A-1.I-A.3.b

== Geology ==
Monte Alpe, from a geological point of view, features limestone dating back to the Triassic era. The area located between Monte Alpe and Monte Galero is characterized by quite a high landslide risk.

== Access to the summit ==
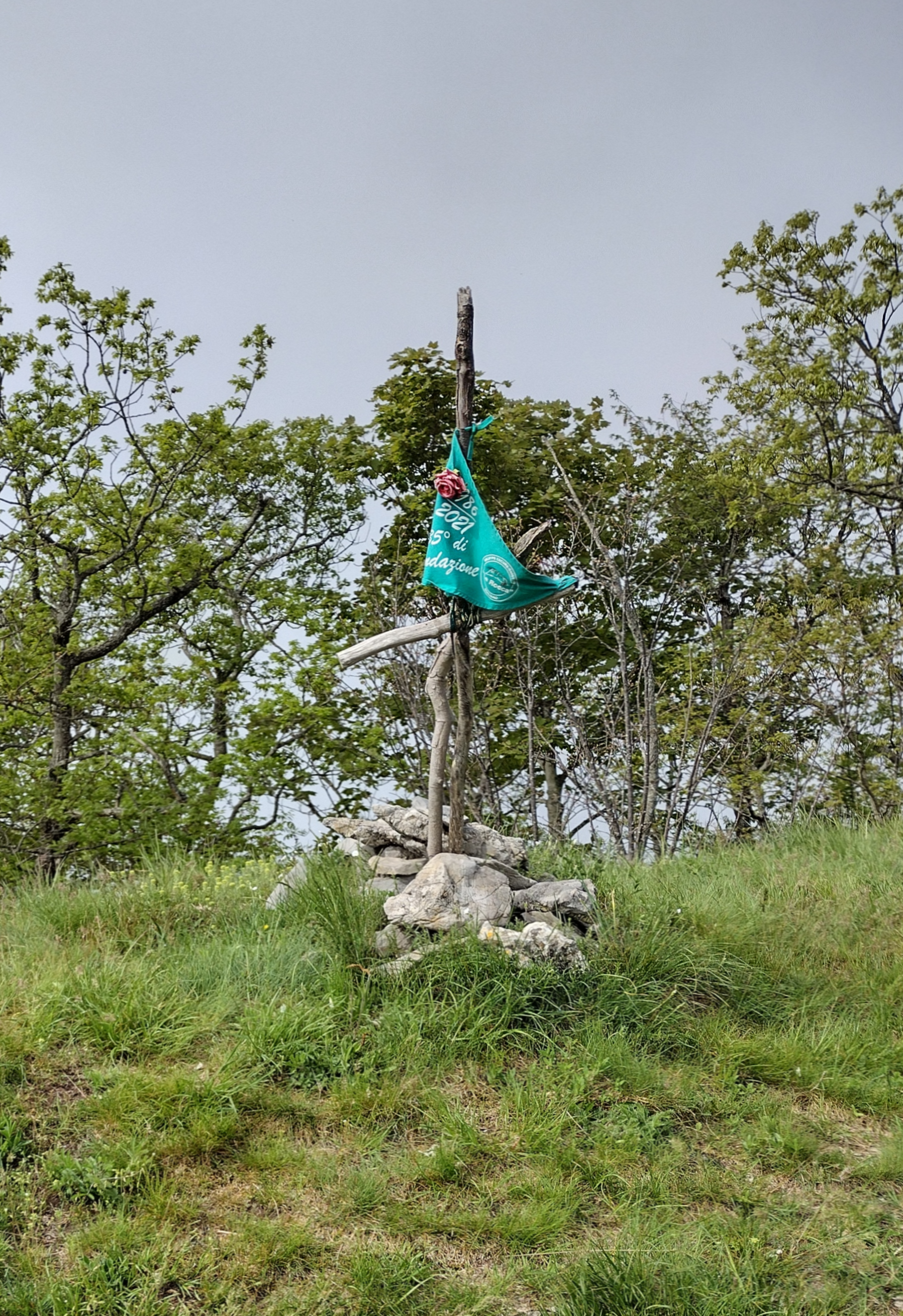
Summit cairn

Monte Alpe can be easily reached on foot following the ridge which connects it with Monte Galero. Others hiking routes start from Erli and Veravo (comune of Castelbianco).

=== Mountain bike ===
The ascent to Monte Alpe is considered a mountain bike itinerary considered quite demanding, but very satisfactory too.

== Bibliography ==
- Marazzi, Sergio (2005). Atlante Orografico delle Alpi. SOIUSA (in Italian). Pavone Canavese: Priuli & Verlucca editori. ISBN 9788880682738.
- Montagna, Euro; Montaldo, Lorenzo (1981). Alpi Liguri. Guida dei Monti d'Italia (in Italian). Milano: CAI / TCI.

== Maps ==
- Cartografia ufficiale italiana in scala 1:25.000 e 1:100.000 (Map). Istituto Geografico Militare.
- Comunità montana ingauna - il suo comprensorio - Cartografia regionale in scala 1:25.000 (Map). Albenga: Comunità montana ingauna. 1998.
