= Fischia il vento =

Song
- English title: "The Wind Whistles"
- Written: September 1943
- Composer: Matvei Blanter
- Lyricist: Felice Cascione

"Fischia il vento" ("The Wind Whistles") is an Italian popular song whose text was written in late 1943, at the inception of the Resistance. The tune is based on the Russian song "Katyusha". Along with "Bella ciao" it is one of the most famous songs celebrating the Italian resistance, the anti-fascist movement that fought the forces that occupied Italy during World War II.

== History ==
The song was broadcast after 8 September 1943 between the high valley of Andora–Stellanello in Passu du Beu behind the Pizzo d'Evigno and afterwards above Curenna, in the "Casone dei Crovi", in the high Valley of Albenga, where the partisan squad led by Felice Cascione took refuge. During that period there were still no partisan songs; therefore, people sang old communist and socialist songs: L'Internazionale, La guardia rossa, Bandiera rossa or the song of anarchic origin Addio Lugano Bella, transformed into Addio Imperia Bella, Vieni o maggio (o Canzone del maggio), on the melody of "Nabucco".

Giacomo Sibilla, battle name Ivan, survivor of the campaign of Russia, joined the partisan squad led by Felice Cascione, where he was added into the 2nd Regiment Genio Pontieri. In the region of Don, Ivan had known Russian prisoners and women, and from them he learned the song Katyusha. Ivan brought it with him to Italy, and in the Passu du Beu he sketched a few verses together with Vittorio Rubicone, Vittorio il Biondo. Then the commander Cascione intervened. Together with Silvano Alterisio, battle name Vassili, and other comrades the verses written by Felice some time prior were adapted to the Russian melody. Recently the "casone" where u Megu and his comrades began writing the famous song was rediscovered. The composition was terminated in the Casone dei Crovi, a location not too distant from the Monte Peso Grande, occupied by partisans in the beginning of the winter of 1943.

=== Debut ===
The song was sung for the first time in Curenna, fraction of Vendone, in Christmas 1943, but it was broadcast officially in Alto, in the square in front of the church, the day of Epiphany 1944. Three weeks after Felice Cascione was killed in battle by nazifascists, and his squad carried his name from that moment on. Right after, this partisan nucleus got larger, and even the twenty-year-old Italo Calvino, living in Sanremo, joined that group with the battle name Santiago, since he was born in Cuba in Santiago de las Vegas. Afterwards Fischia il Vento officially became the anthem of the Brigate Partigiane Garibaldi.

In the original lyrics the verse "eppur bisogna andar" ("but we must march on") was actually "eppur bisogna ardir" ("but we must dare"), as documented in the book by Giorgio Pagano, with the title taken from the original verse.

== Sample lyrics ==
Original Italian lyrics:

Fischia il vento, infuria [urla] la bufera,
scarpe rotte eppur bisogna andar
a conquistare la rossa primavera
dove sorge il sol dell'avvenir,
a conquistare la rossa primavera
dove sorge il sol dell'avvenir.

Ogni contrada è patria del ribelle,
ogni donna a lui dona un sospir,
nella notte lo guidano le stelle
forte il cuore e il braccio nel colpir,
nella notte lo guidano le stelle
forte il cuore e il braccio nel colpir.

Se ci coglie la crudele morte,
dura vendetta verrà dal partigian;
ormai sicura è [già] la dura sorte
del fascista vile traditor,
ormai sicura è [già] la dura sorte
del fascista vile traditor.

Cessa il vento, calma è la bufera,
torna a casa il fiero partigian,
sventolando la rossa sua bandiera;
vittoriosi e alfin liberi siam.
sventolando la rossa sua bandiera;
vittoriosi e alfin liberi siam.

Translated English lyrics:

The wind whistles, the storm rages,
our shoes are broken but we must march on,
to conquer the red spring,
where the sun of the future rises.
to conquer the red spring,
where the sun of the future rises.

Every street is fatherland to the rebel,
every woman has a sigh for him,
the stars guide him through the night,
strong his heart and his arm when they strike.
the stars guide him through the night,
strong his heart and his arm when they strike.

If cruel death catches us
harsh revenge will come from the partisan
already certain is the harsh fate
of the vile treasonous fascist.
already certain is the harsh fate
of the vile treasonous fascist.

The wind stops and the storm calms,
the proud partisan returns home,
blowing in the wind his red flag,
victorious, at last free we are.
blowing in the wind his red flag,
victorious, at last free we are.

== Recordings ==
- 1965 Milva on the album Canti della libertà
- 1993 Modena City Ramblers on the album Combat Folk
- 1995 Skiantos on the VV. AA. album compilation Materiale Resistente 1945-1995 and reprinted on their 2004 album Rarities
- 2003 Banda Bassotti on the album Así es mi vida
- 2009 P38Punk on the album Fischia il vento (singolo)
- 2010 Talco on the album 10 Years
- 2013 Kenobit on the album Kenobit
- 2013 NH3
- 2016 Greta Olm

== In Films ==
- The song was featured in the 2003 Italian film Buongiorno, Notte, in which several characters involved in the resistance movement sang it at a celebratory event.
- The song and music appeared in the 2023 mini-series The Lying Life of Adults (TV series), where it is associated with Neapolitan communists.

== See also ==
- Bella ciao – another Italian partisan song
- Bandiera Rossa – another Italian revolutionary song
- Siamo i ribelli della montagna – another Italian partisan song
- Zog nit keyn mol – A Yiddish partisan song popularized during WW2
