= Armetta =

Armetta may refer to:

- Henry Armetta (1888–1945), American actor
- Monte Armetta, mountain

== See also ==
- Arnetta, genus of butterflies
