= Monte della Guardia =

Mountain in Italy

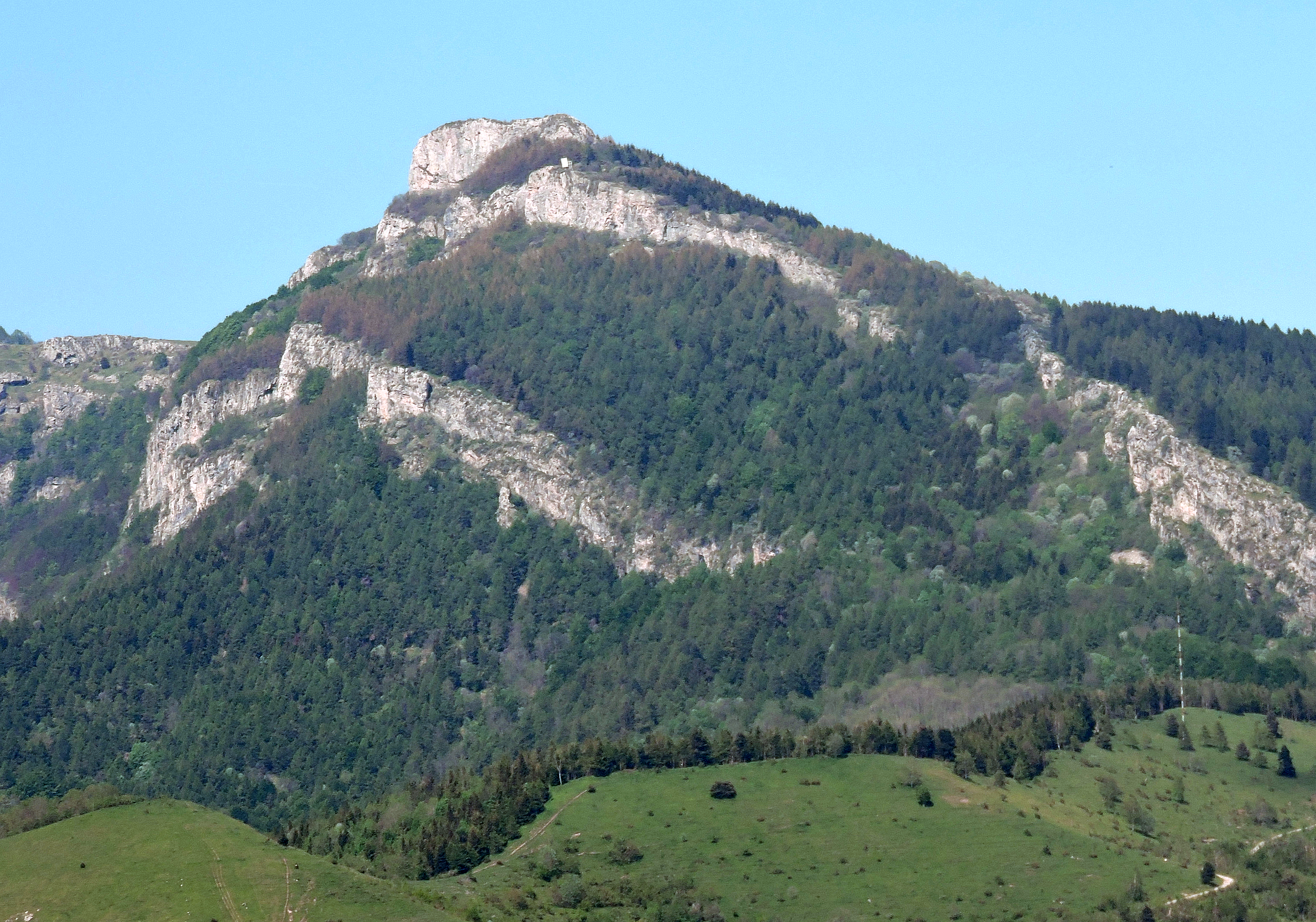
- View from Forte Pozzanghi (Colle di Nava)

Highest point
- Elevation: 1,658 m (5,440 ft)
- Prominence: 88
- Coordinates: 44°07′19″N 7°55′47″E

Naming
- English translation: Mountain of the guard
- Language of name: Italian

Geography
- Location within Alps
- Location: Piedmont, Italy
- Parent range: Ligurian Alps

Geology
- Rock age: Triassic
- Mountain type: limestone

Climbing
- First ascent: ancestral
- Easiest route: hike from Colle di Caprauna

The Monte della Guardia is a mountain in Piedmont, northern Italy, part of the Alps. At an altitude of 1,658 metres is one of the highest summits of the Ligurian Prealps.

== Geography ==
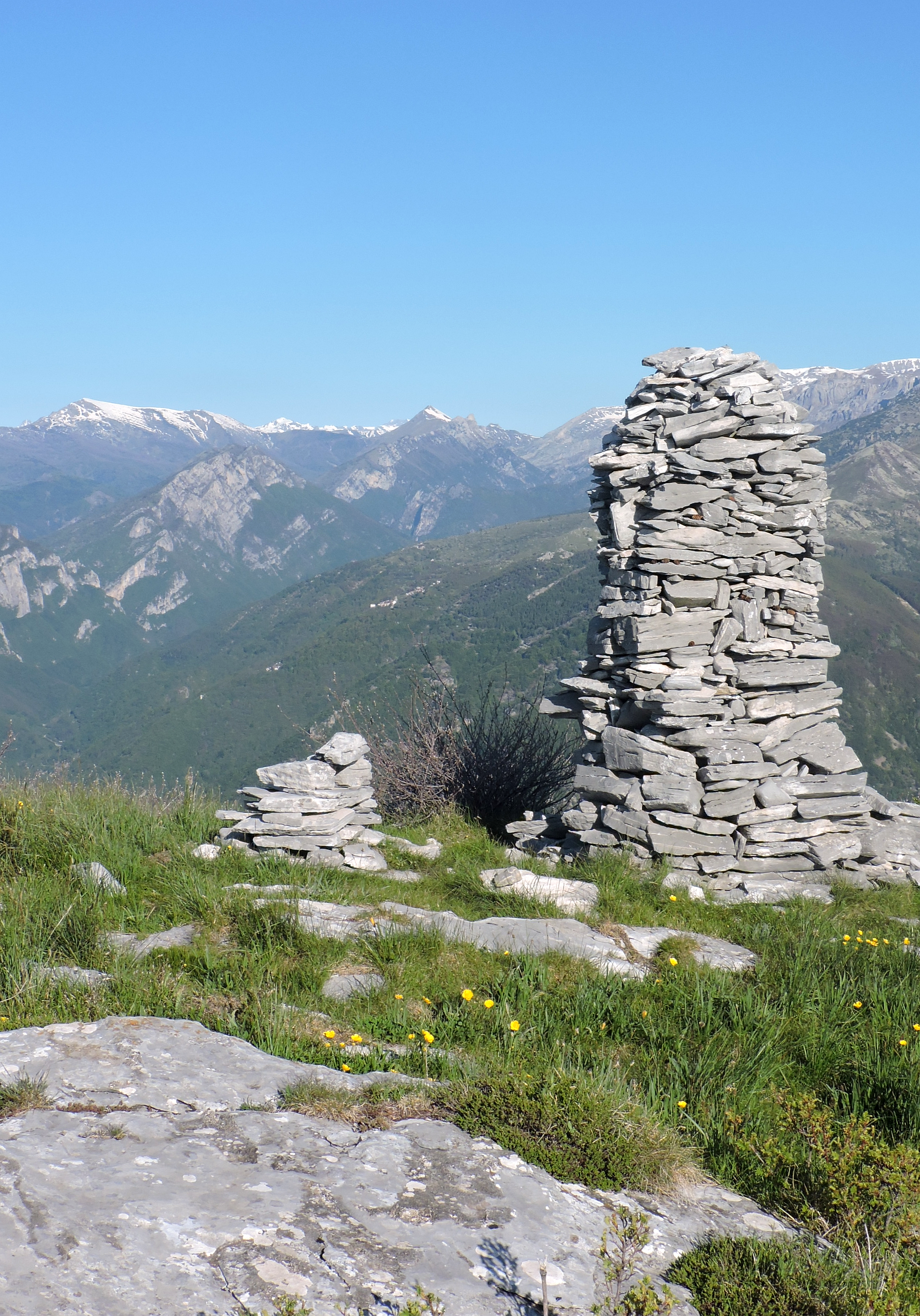
Summit cairn.

The mountain stands on the main chain of the Alps between Tanaro and Arroscia valleys. It belongs to the province of Cuneo, in Piedmont, and is located on the border between the municipalities of Ormea and Caprauna, not faraway from Liguria.

=== SOIUSA classification ===
According to the SOIUSA (International Standardized Mountain Subdivision of the Alps) the mountain can be classified in the following way:

- main part = Western Alps
- major sector = South Western Alps
- section = Ligurian Alps
- subsection = Prealpi Liguri
- supergroup = Catena Settepani-Carmo-Armetta
- group = Gruppo Galero-Armetta
- subgroup = Costiera Galero-Armetta
- code = I/A-1.I-A.3.a

== Geology ==
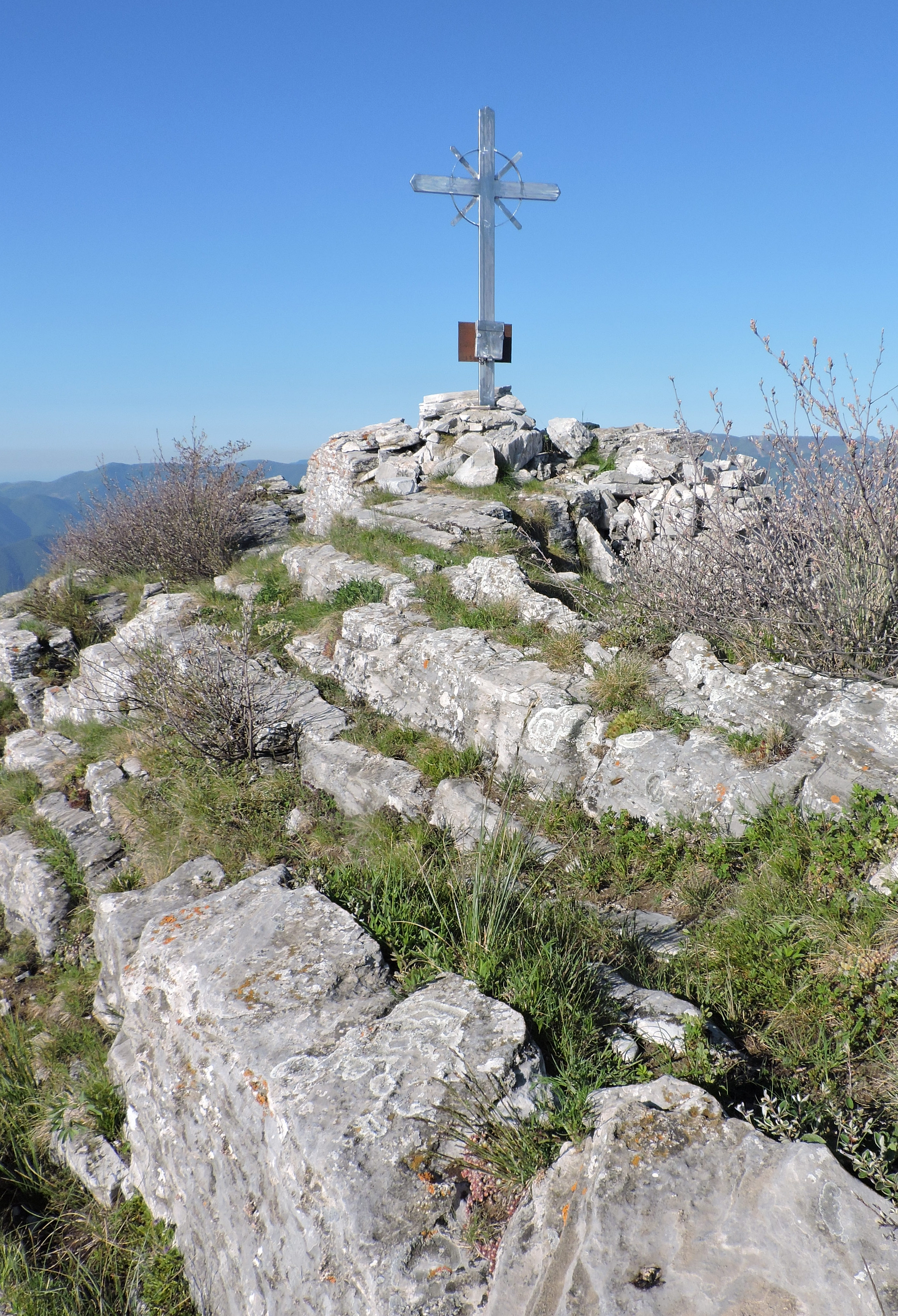
Summit cross

The area of Monte della Guardia is characterized by triassic limestone. Towards monte Armetta, on the slopes facing the Tanaro valley, stands a large cave known as Grotta dei Dighè or Garb del Dighea. It was surveyed at the end of the 19th century by entomologists that detected an interesting troglofauna with Plectogona sanfilippoi, subsp. Digheae, an arthropod endemic of Tanaro valley.

== Environment ==
The northern side of the mountain fells with overhanging cliffs towards the valley of Tanaro river, while its gentler southern slopes are mainly covered of woods.

== Access to the summit ==
The summit can be easily reached with a short diversion from the Alta Via dei Monti Liguri, a long-distance trail from Ventimiglia (province of Imperia) to Bolano (province of La Spezia) which flancks the mountain on its Ligurian Sea side. In wintertime the northern slopes of Monte della Guardia offer some interesting icefalls.
