= Monte Peso Grande =

Mountain in Italy

- Castell'Ermo
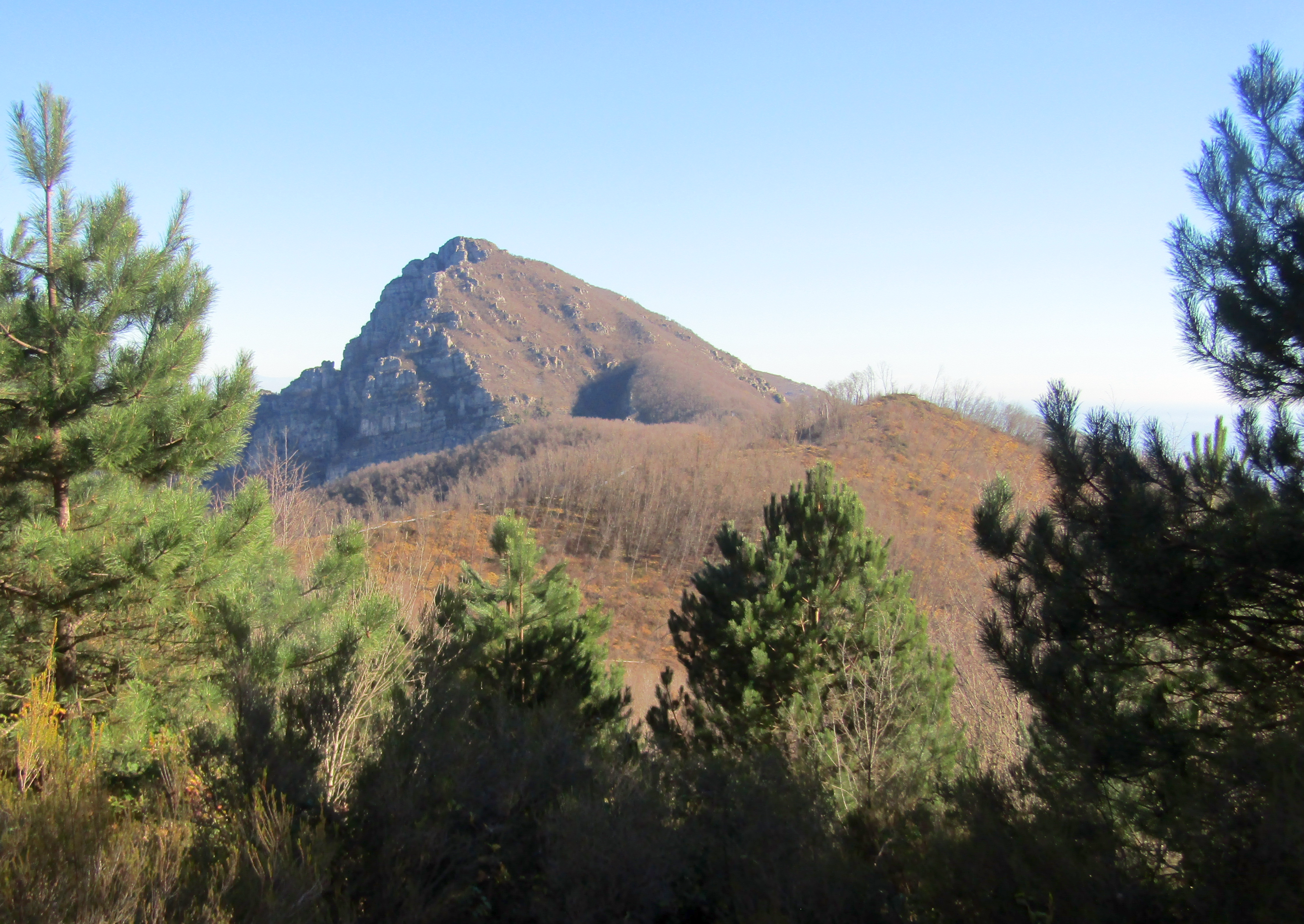
- Monte Peso Grande as seen from Prati di Bacelega

Highest point
- Elevation: 1,092 m (3,583 ft)
- Prominence: 345 m (1,132 ft)
- Coordinates: 44°05′53″N 8°03′09″E

Naming
- English translation: Heavy weight mountain

Geography
- Location within Alps
- Location: Liguria, Italy
- Parent range: Ligurian Alps

Climbing
- First ascent: ancestral
- Easiest route: footpaths from Arnasco or Borgo di Curenna (Vendone)

Monte Peso Grande o Castell'Ermo (1.092 m) is a mountain of the Ligurian Prealps, the eastern section of the Ligurian Alps.

== Features ==
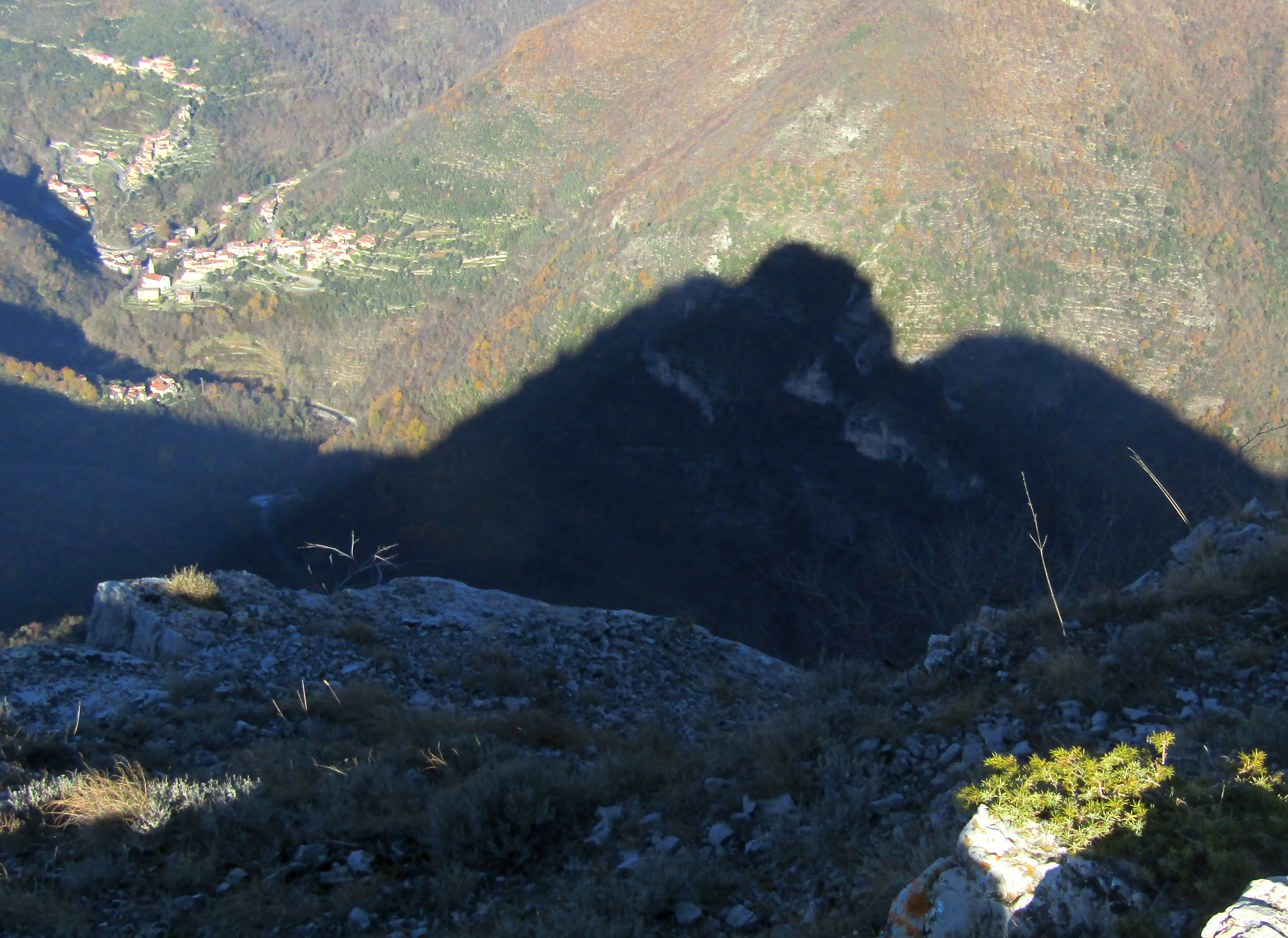
The shadow of the mountain on the Pennavaira valley, with the village of Nasino

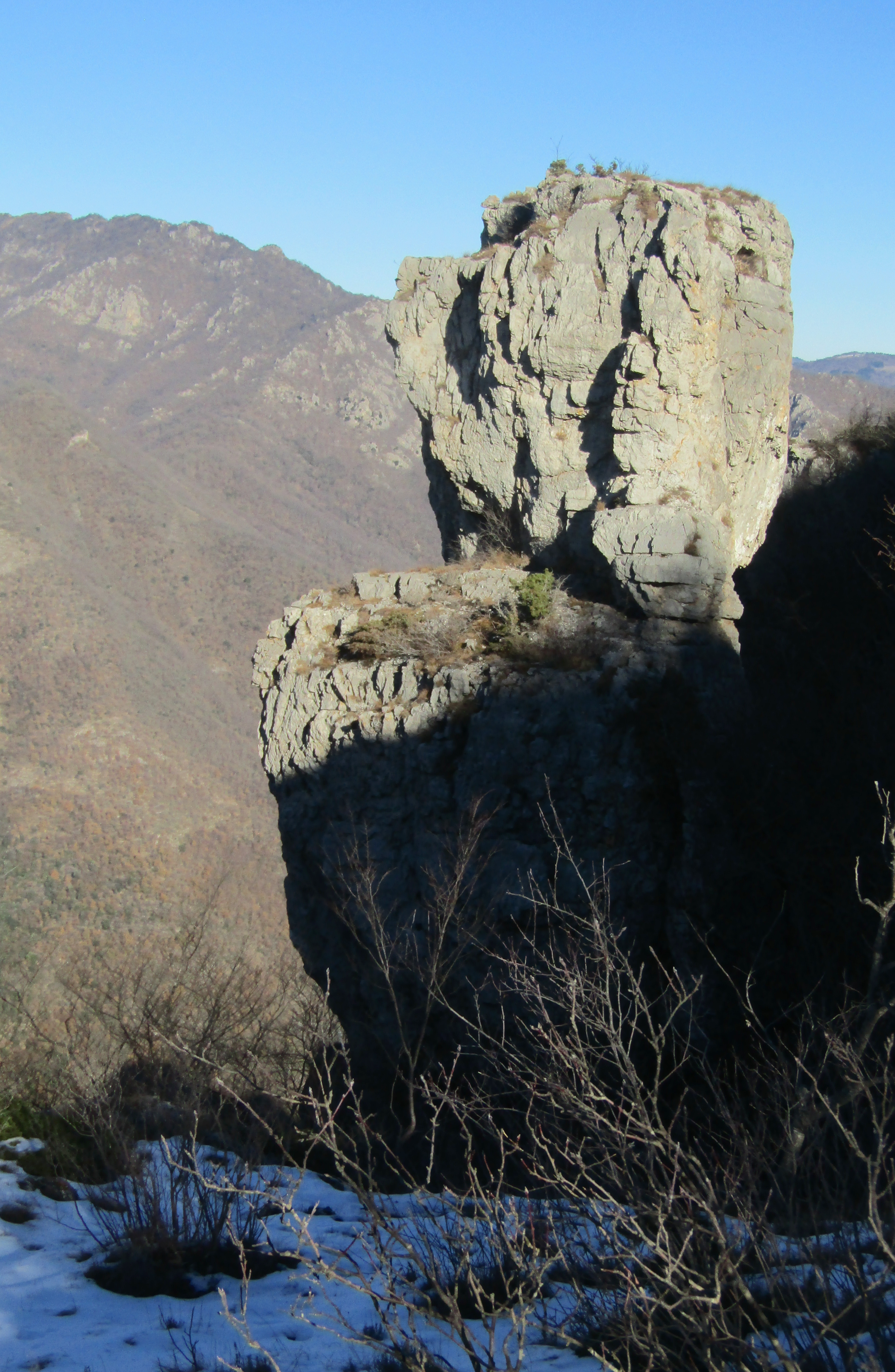
A rock spire close to the E summit

The mountain stands on the water divide between Arroscia (South) and Pennavaira valleys. Westwards a saddle named Colla d'Onzo divides it from the minor elevations of Prati di Bacelega and Monte Cucco, while eastwards the ridge goes on with the E summit of Castellermo (1.062 m), goes down to the Colla di Curenna (900 m about), rises up to the Monte Nero (981 m) and ends in the lowland of Albenga. The North face of Castellermo features rock spires and sandstone cliffs. Its southern slopes also show rocky areas, but they are not so steep and are covered in thick bushes and woodland, mainly of broad-leaf trees. On the South face of the mountain also stands, in a panoramic position and at an elevation of about 1000 metres, the tiny Catholic sanctuary of San Calocero, built during the Middle Ages. The prominence of the mountain is 345 metres. A sub-summit East of the top of the mountain bears a cross which can be seen from the lowland. Administratively the Peso Grande belongs to the comune of Vendone; the chief town of the municipality stands in the Arroscia valley but its territory overflows the water divide and also encompasses a portion of the Pennavaira valley.

=== SOIUSA classification ===
According to the SOIUSA (International Standardized Mountain Subdivision of the Alps) the mountain can be classified in the following way:

- main part = Western Alps; major sector = South Western Alps, section = Ligurian Alps, subsection = Prealpi Liguri
- supergroup = Catena Settepani-Carmo-Armetta, group = Gruppo Galero-Armetta, subgroup = Dorsale della Rocca delle Penne, code = I/A-1.I-A.3.c

== Geology ==
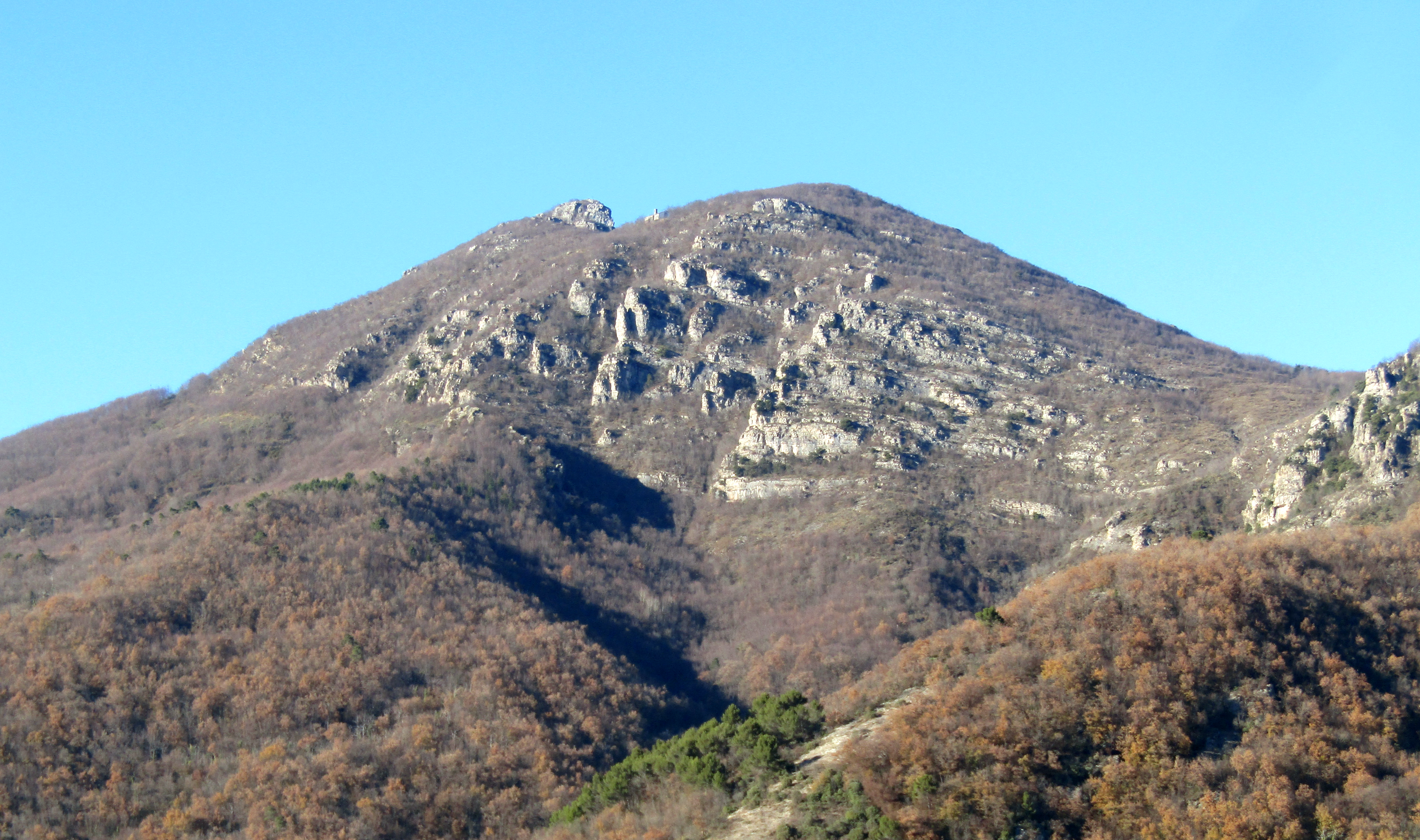
The mountain as seen from Vendone

A tectonic unit, mainly made of sandstone and dolomite, takes its name from monte Castell'Ermo. Chronologically this unit is attributed to the upper Triassic and Jurassic, while in palaeogeography it's considered as the innermost part of the Briançonnais zone, an area of the Penninic nappes of the Alps. Close to the mountain have been found characteristic radiolarites dating back to the Jurassic. In 1904 the geologist Gaetano Rovereto, in his work Geomorfologia delle Valli Liguri, mentioned the Castellermo for its craggy peaks, with horrid and distinctive shapes (cime dirupate, orride e con forme caratteristiche).

== History ==
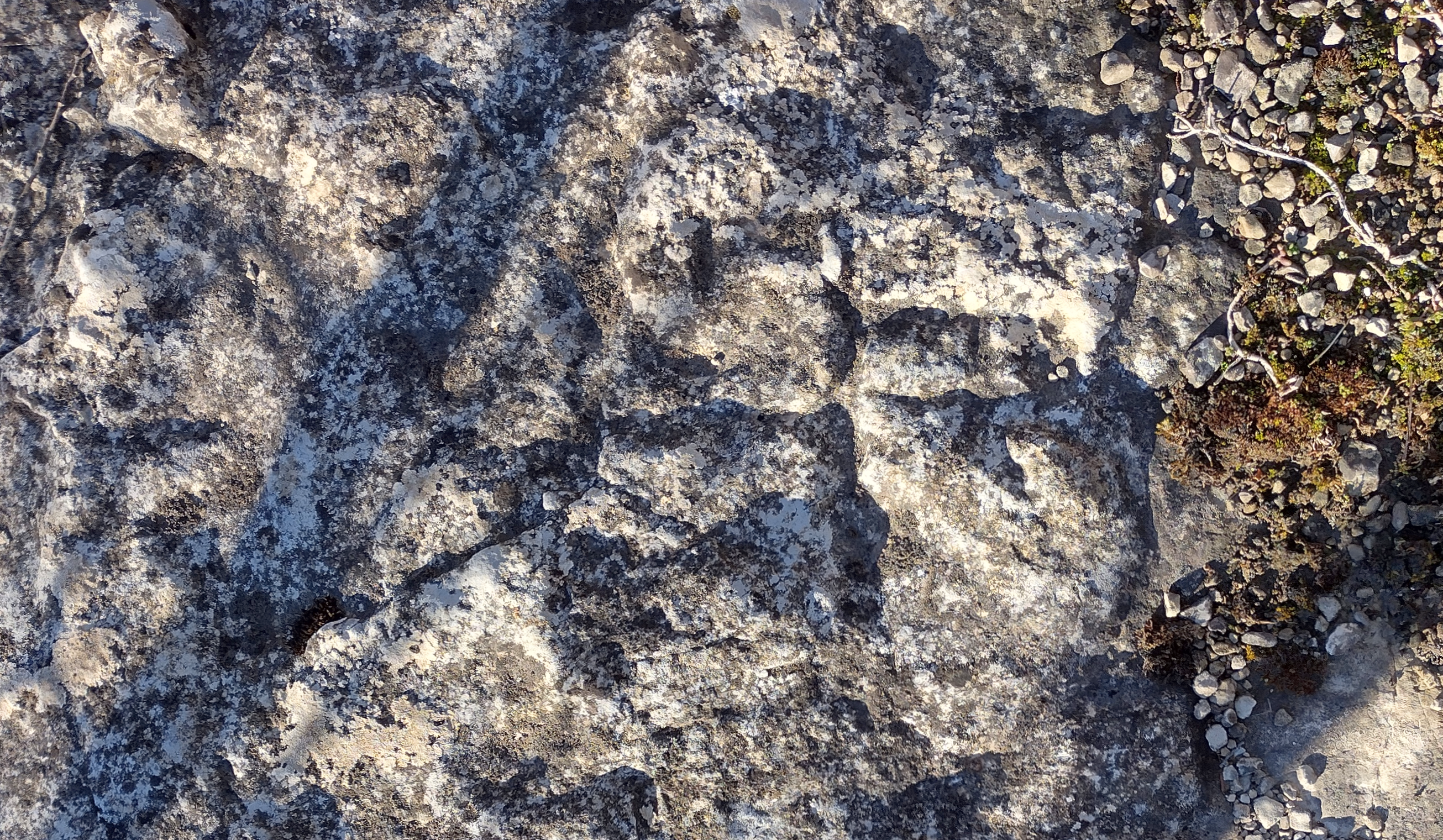
Crosses engraved on a rock close to the summit

The Castell'Ermo, due to its prominent location and its strong visual impact, during prehistory was considered a kind of sacred mountain. In particular on the slopes nowadays included in the municipality of Vendone, in a place referred as "Tre Pe", there was a dolmen presumably built by the Ligures, which was destroyed by some youngsters of the village in the early post war years. The sacredness of the place was also recognized during the Middle Ages, when was built the Sanctuary of San Calocero, which nowadays remains the destination of a pilgrimage, taking place every five years and involving many worshipers coming from the nearby villages. The same name Castellermo, a short form of Castello dell'Eremo (in English Castle of the hermitage), is connected to an ancient tradition stating that saint Calocerus lived there as an hermit. During the years of the Resistance the area was used as a refuge by the partigiani. In the Casone dei Crovi, an old building close tho the summit of mount Peso Grande, at the end of 1943 some partisans led by commander Felice Cascione composed the famous song Fischia il vento, which was executed in public for the first time in the nearby village of Curenna.

== Access to the summit ==
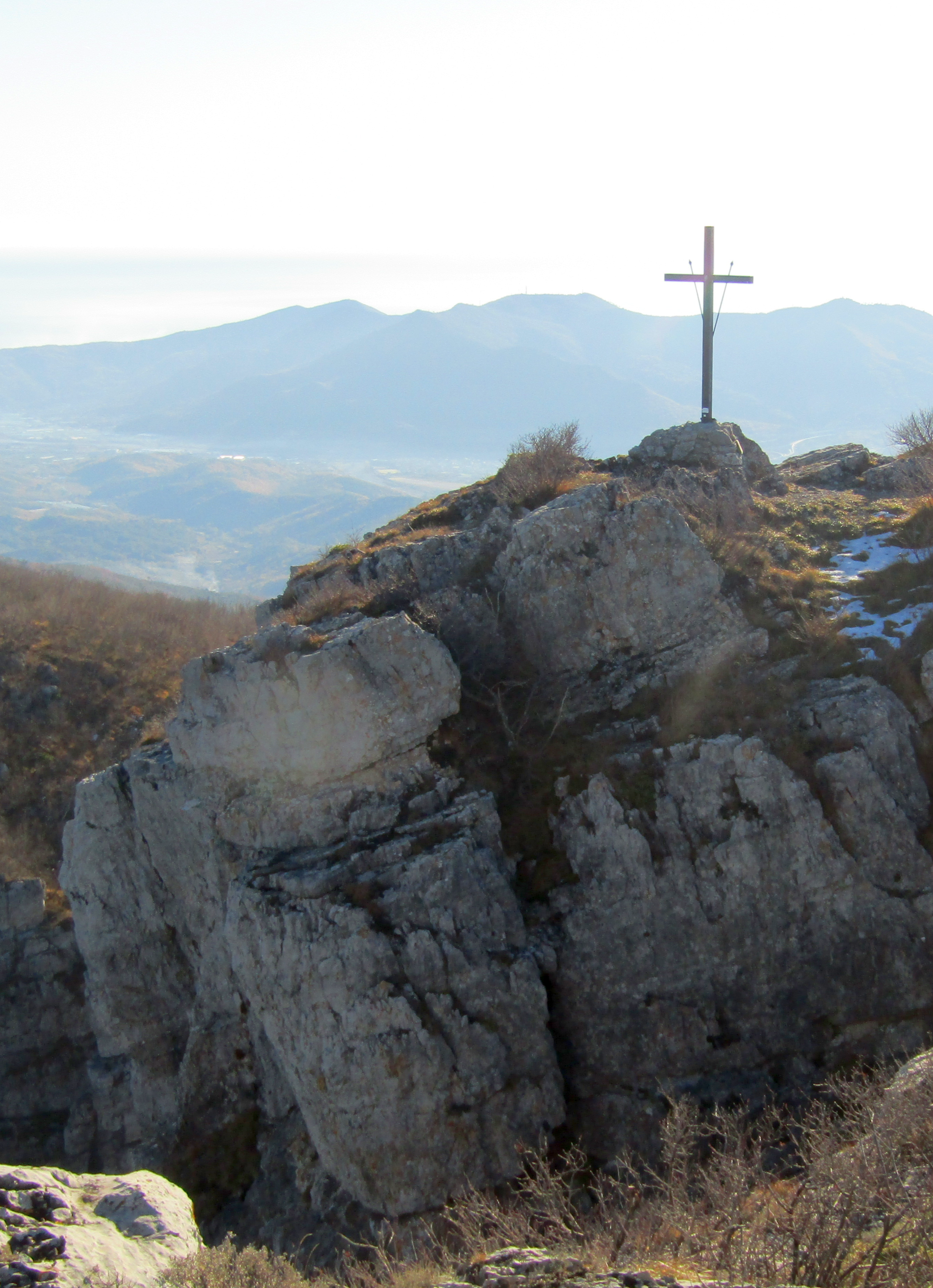
The cross on the Castellermo subsummit

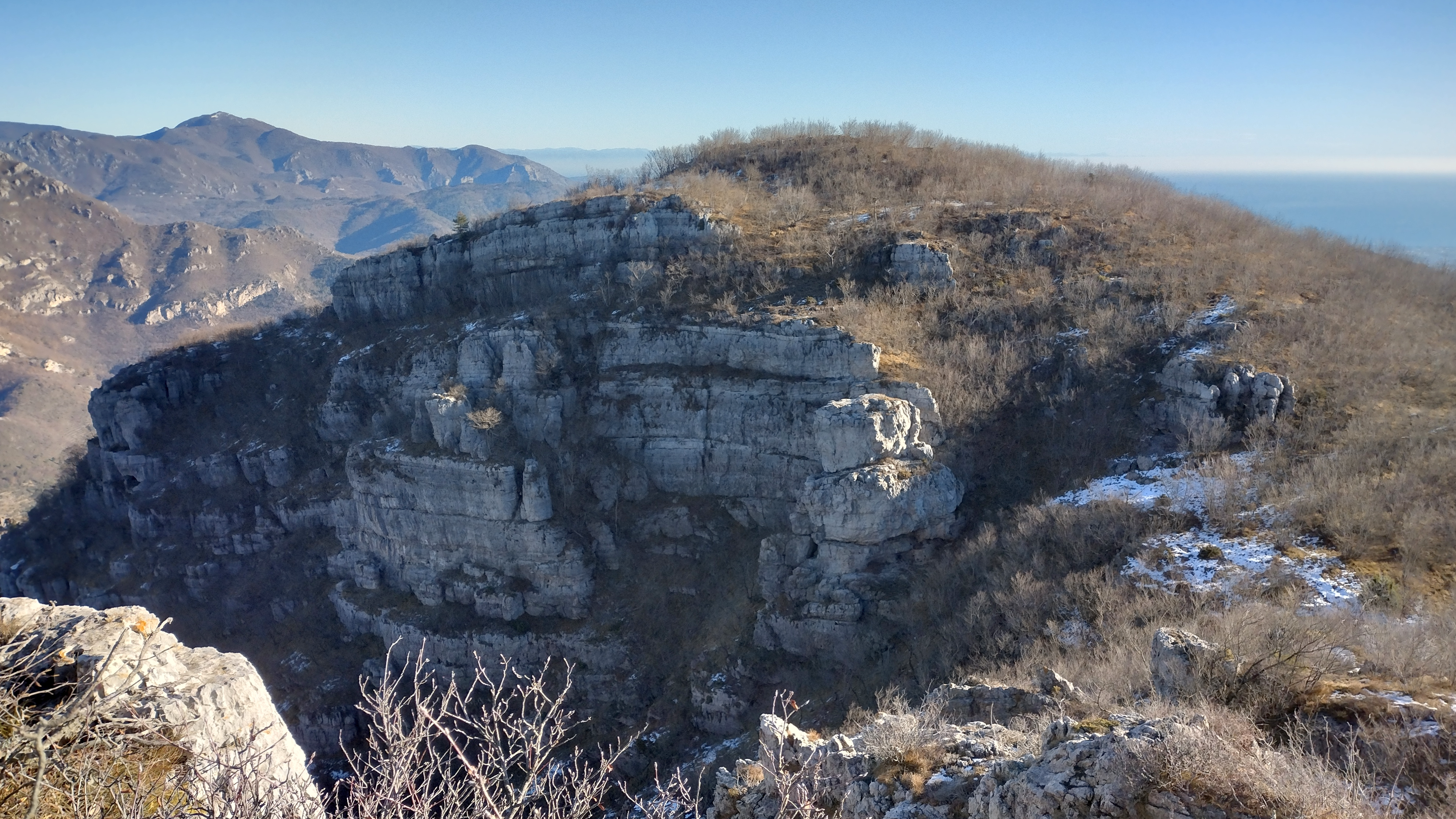
E summit, with the Ligurian Sea in the background

=== Hiking ===
The Castellermo can be reached from San Calocero sanctuary, which can be accessed either from the East with a footpath which runs starts from Arnasco and runs close to the Arroscia/Pennavaira ridge, or from West, also following the water divide. San Calocero can also be accessed by some villages in the comune of Vendone like Borgo di Curenna. These itineraries are not difficult and does not require alpinistic skills. The round-shaped Eastern sub-summit of the Castellermo can be accessed offtrack starting from the saddle on the Arroscia/Pennavaira ridge which divides it from the main summit. The hike can be nice even in winter, due to the mild climate of the area, but is not advisable during the summer, when the heat can be excessive.

=== Rock climbing ===
Although the rock is not considered of a good quality, on the North face of the mountain have been described several climbing routes. The climbers' frequentation was forbidden in the late 20th century due to the annoyance that it caused to the nesting birds of the area. Some of these routes have been experimentally re-opened because the experts assessed they had a minor impact on the wildife.

== Environment protection ==
The mountain and its surrounding area are included in the SCI (Site of Community Importance) named Castell'Ermo – Peso Grande (code: IT1324818).

== Bibliography ==
- Marazzi, Sergio (2005). Atlante Orografico delle Alpi. SOIUSA (in Italian). Pavone Canavese: Priuli & Verlucca editori. ISBN 9788880682738.
- Montagna, Euro; Montaldo, Lorenzo (1981). Alpi Liguri. Guida dei Monti d'Italia (in Italian). Milano: CAI / TCI.

== Maps ==
- Cartografia ufficiale italiana in scala 1:25.000 e 1:100.000 (Map). Istituto Geografico Militare.
- Comunità montana ingauna – il suo comprensorio – Cartografia regionale in scala 1:25.000 (Map). Albenga: Comunità montana ingauna. 1998.
