= Colletta di Castelbianco =

Ancient village in Italy

Coordinates: 44.1111°N 8.0658°E

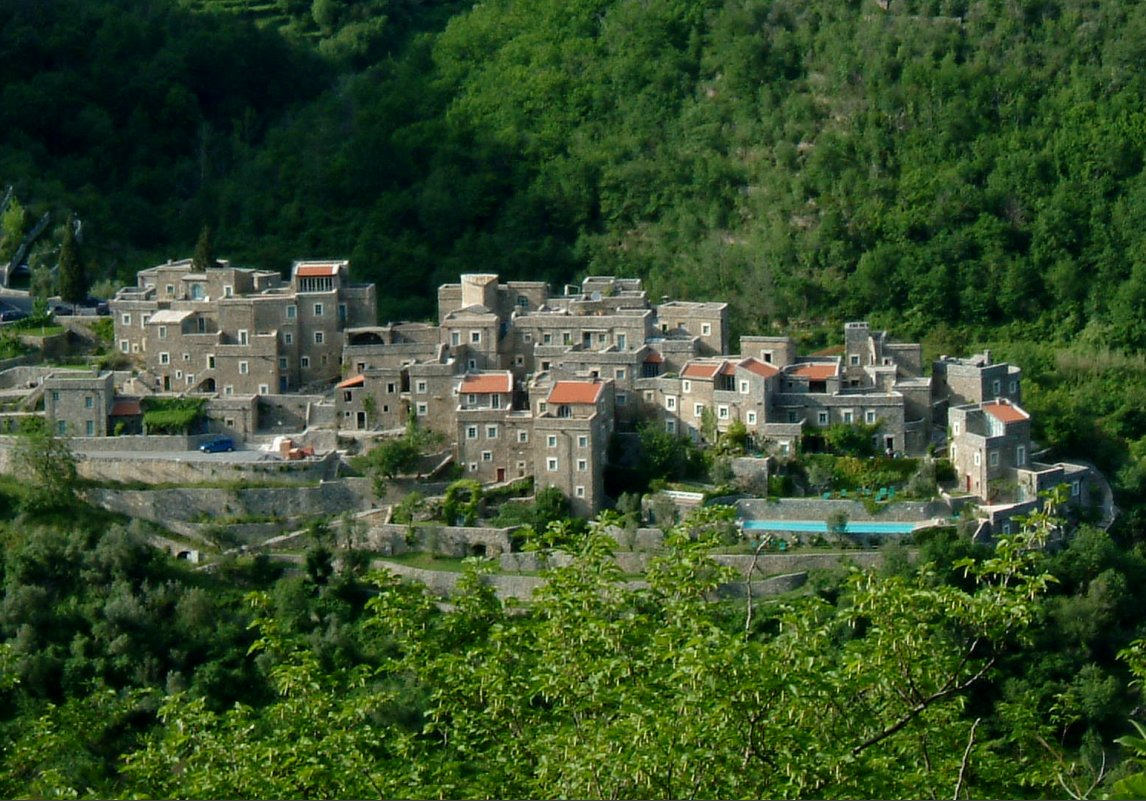
Colletta di Castelbianco

Colletta di Castelbianco is an ancient village in the Maritime Alps and a frazione of the comune of Castelbianco, in the province of Savona in Liguria, Italy. It is one of I Borghi più belli d'Italia ("The most beautiful villages of Italy").

The village is entirely built of stone and was probably established as a defense against the Saracens in the 13th century.

Abandoned in the 1950s, Colletta has been the subject of a restoration project started in the 1990s operating on two levels. On one level, has been made a general restoration of the ancient settlement, respecting the original materials and building techniques (the restoration plan was developed by architect Giancarlo De Carlo); on another level, the village has been provided with a sophisticated technological infrastructure (the telematization project was conceived by Valerio Saggini and planned by Valerio Saggini and Stefania Belloni) which has enabled new inhabitants to benefit from the widest possible range of telecommunications resources. In this way, they are able to enjoy the peace and isolation offered by the village while staying in touch with the work environment and, more generally, with the information resources available all over the world. Thus it is possible for remote workers to live or spend time in Colletta.

In 2005, the village had its first olive harvest in 30 years and is now producing small quantities of high-grade olive oil from the local taggiasca olives.

== Gallery ==
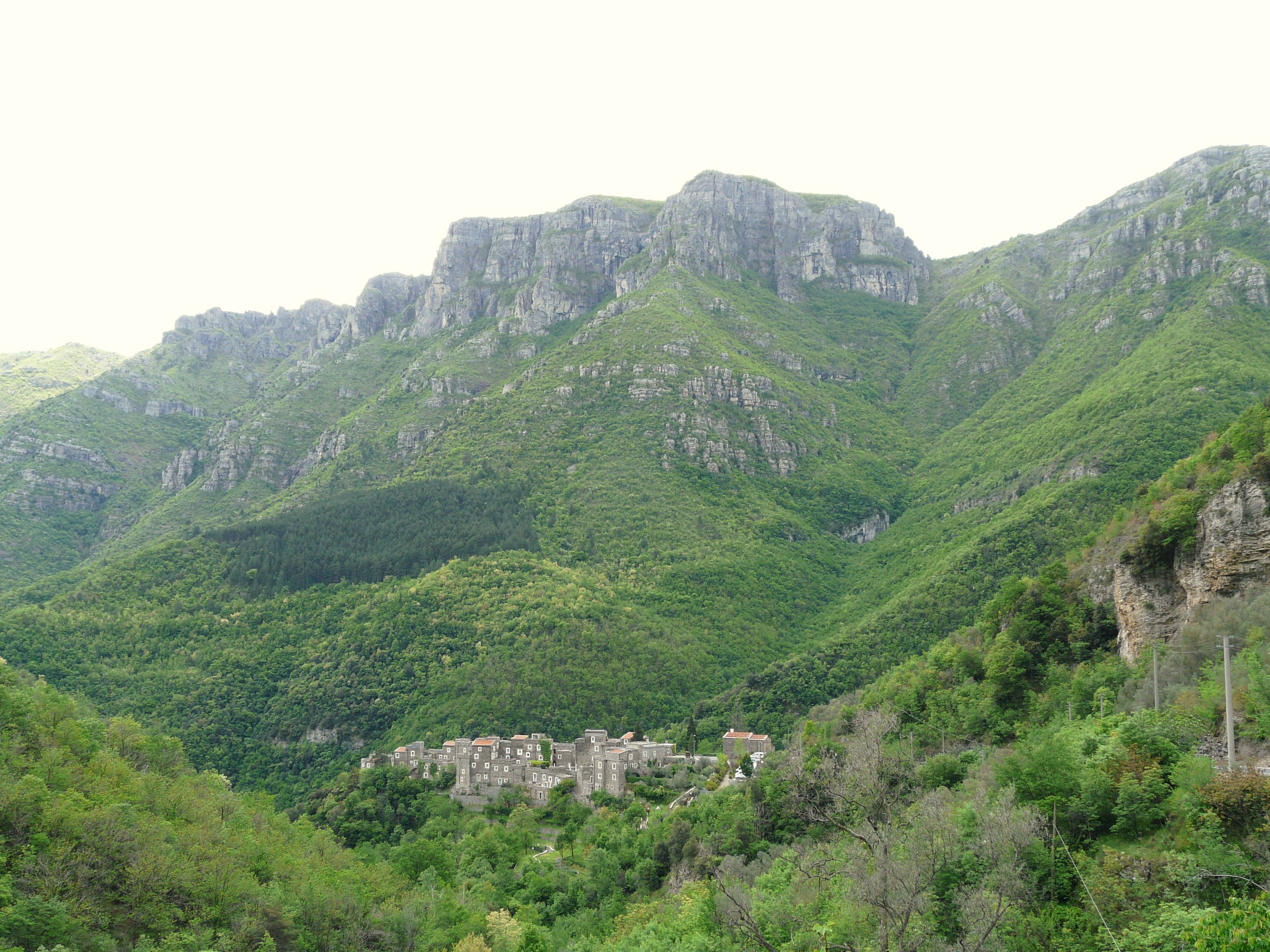
Colletta di Castelbianco

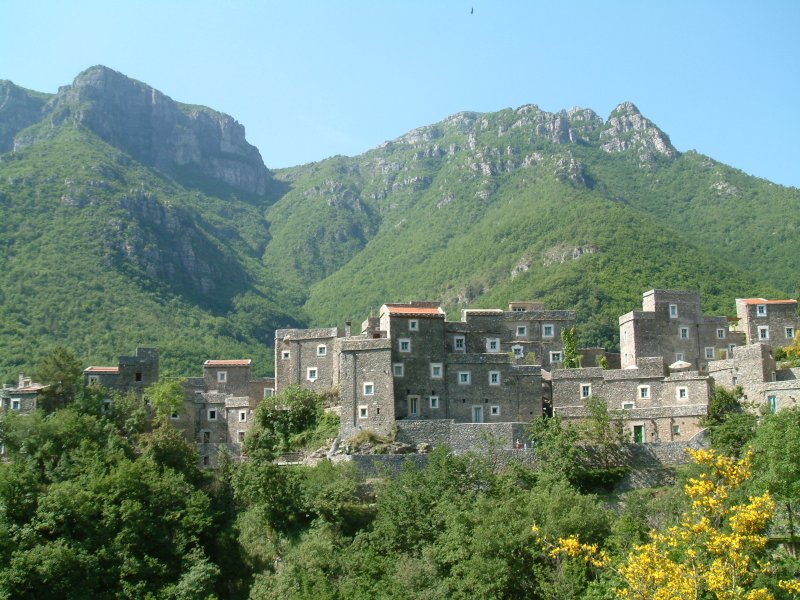
Monte Castel Ermo
