= Onzo =

- Comune
- Comune di Onzo
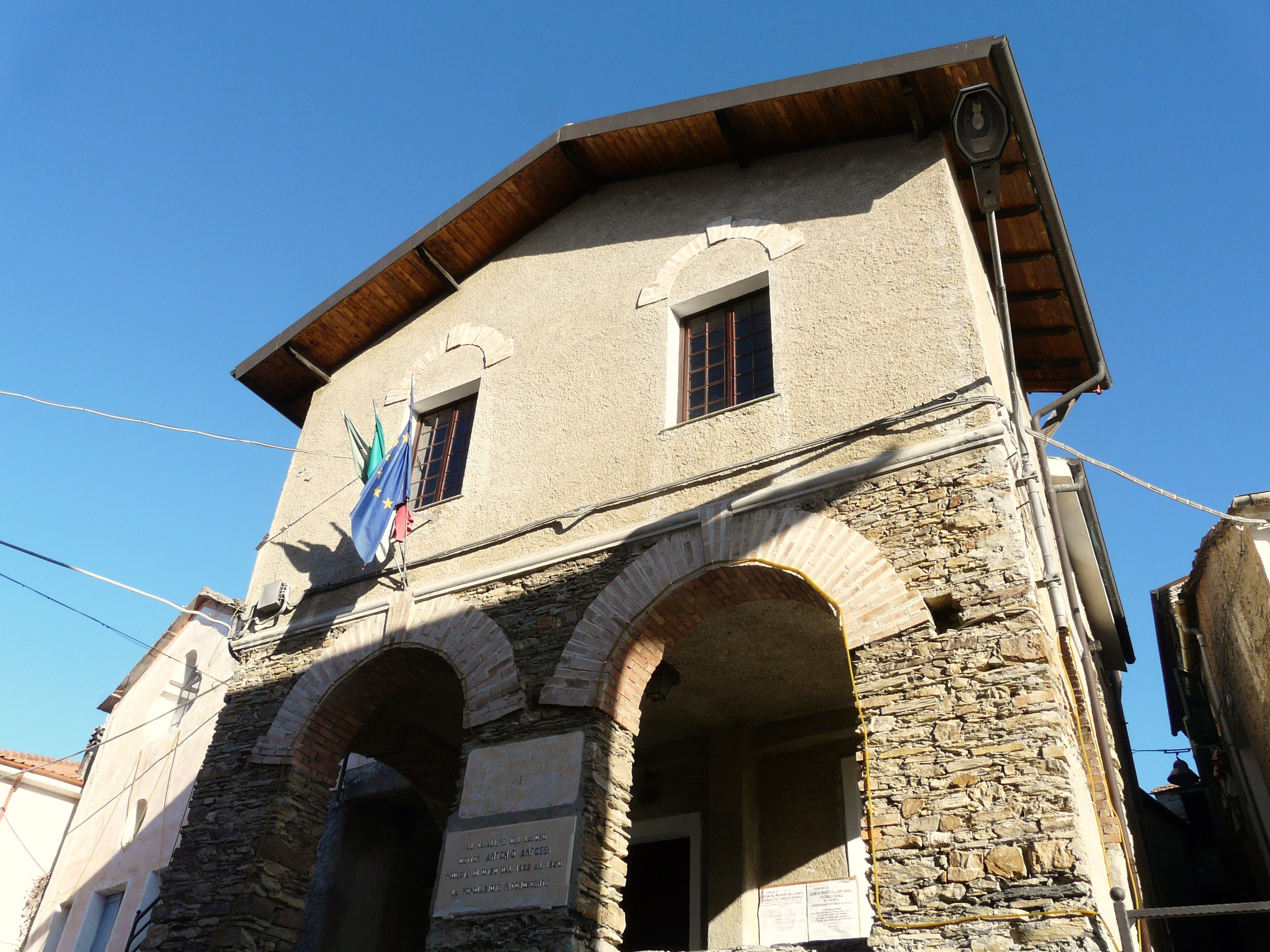
- Town hall

- Coat of arms

- Location within Italy Location within Liguria
- Coordinates: 44°4′N 8°3′E
- Country: Italy
- Region: Liguria
- Province: Savona (SV)
- Frazioni: Varavo Superiore, Varavo Inferiore, Ponterotto, Menezzo, Costa, Capitolo

Government
  - Mayor: Alessandro Bottello

Area
  - Total: 8.23 km^{2} (3.18 sq mi)
- Elevation: 410 m (1,350 ft)

Population (31 December 217)
  - Total: 216
  - Density: 26.2/km^{2} (68.0/sq mi)
- Demonym: Onzesi
- Time zone: UTC+1 (CET)
  - Summer (DST): UTC+2 (CEST)
- Postal code: 17030
- Dialing code: 0182
- Website: Official website

Onzo (Ligurian: Onsu) is a comune (municipality) in the Province of Savona in the Italian region Liguria, located about 80 kilometres (50 mi) southwest of Genoa and about 45 kilometres (28 mi) southwest of Savona.

Onzo borders the following municipalities: Aquila di Arroscia, Casanova Lerrone, Castelbianco, Nasino, Ortovero, Ranzo, and Vendone.
