= Aquila d'Arroscia =

Aquila d'Arroscia Aquila d'Areuscia
- Comune
- Comune di Aquila d'Arroscia
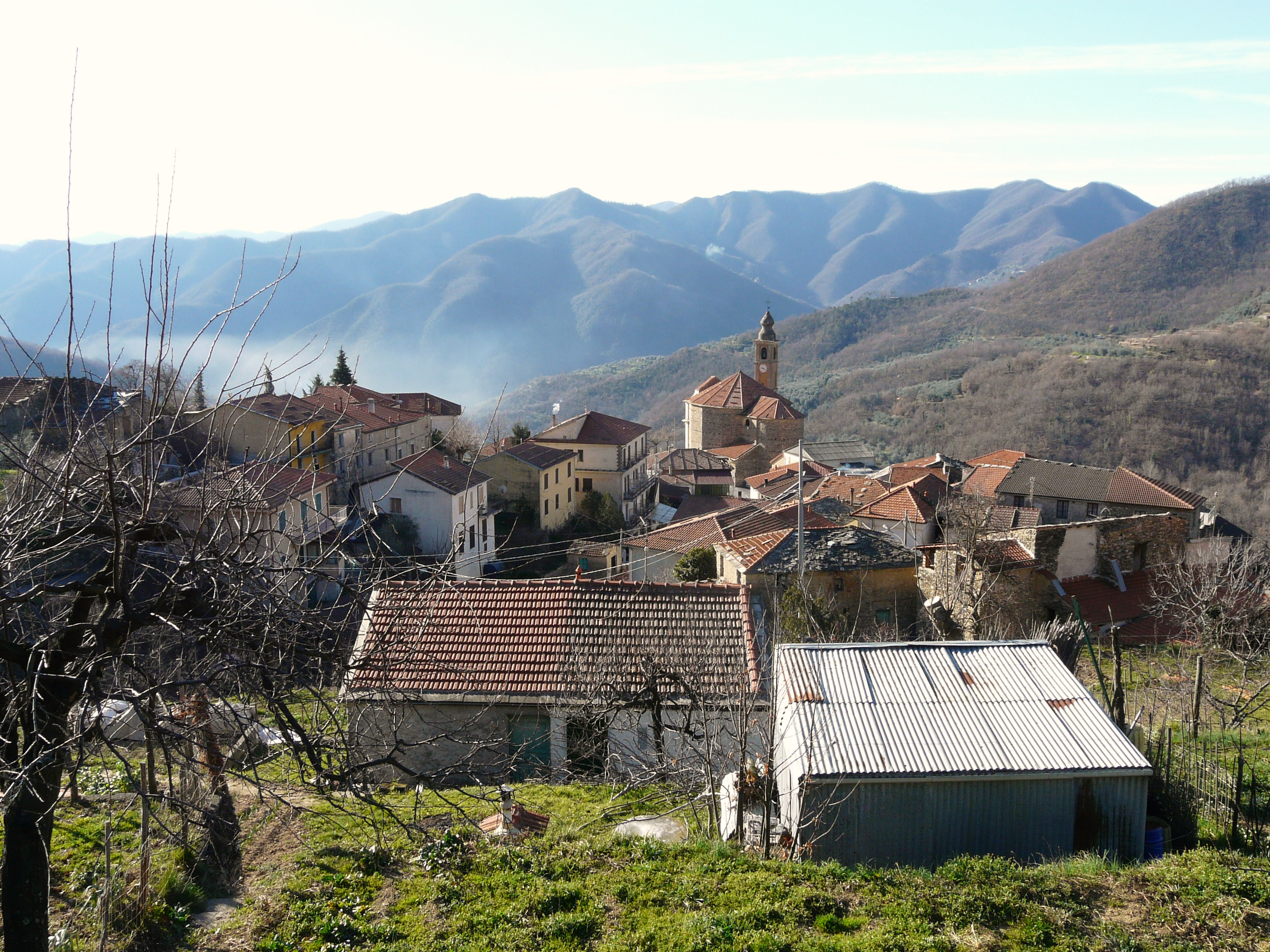
- View of Aquila d'Arroscia

- Coat of arms

- Location of Aquila d'Arroscia in Italy Aquila d'Arroscia (Liguria)
- Coordinates: 44°5′N 8°0′E
- Country: Italy
- Region: Liguria
- Province: Province of Imperia (IM)

Government
  - Mayor: Tullio Cha

Area
  - Total: 10.06 km^{2} (3.88 sq mi)
- Elevation: 495 m (1,624 ft)

Population (31 May 2022)
  - Total: 141
  - Density: 14.0/km^{2} (36.3/sq mi)
- Demonym: Aquilotti
- Time zone: UTC+1 (CET)
  - Summer (DST): UTC+2 (CEST)
- Postal code: 18028
- Dialing code: 0183
- Website: Official website

Aquila d'Arroscia (Ligurian: Aquila d'Areuscia) is a comune (municipality) in the Province of Imperia in the Italian region Liguria, located about 80 kilometres (50 mi) southwest of Genoa and about 20 kilometres (12 mi) north of Imperia.

Aquila d'Arroscia borders the following municipalities: Alto, Borghetto d'Arroscia, Caprauna, Nasino, Onzo, and Ranzo.
