= Ranzo =

Ranzo Ranso
- Comune
- Comune di Ranzo
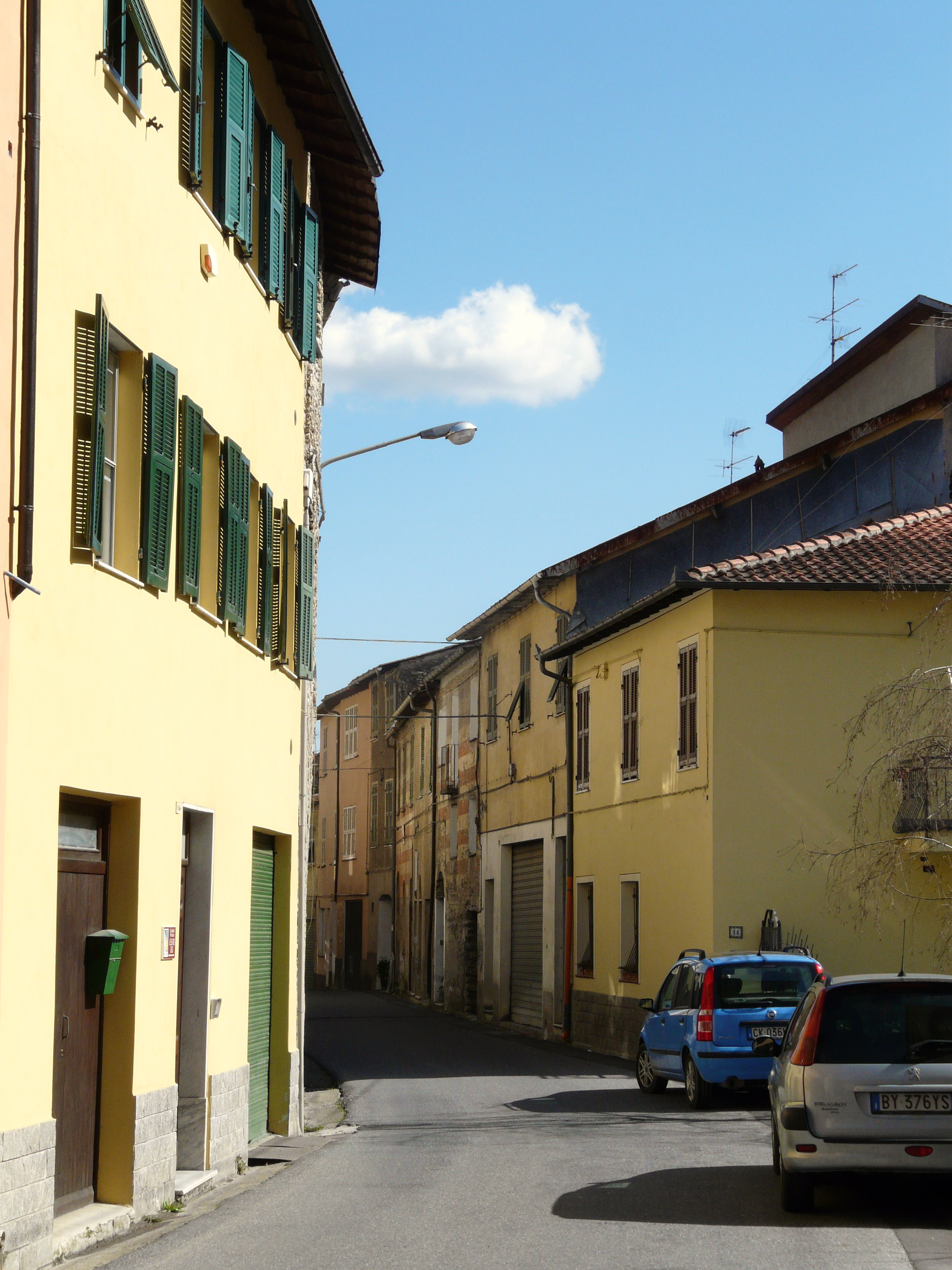
- View of Ranzo

- Location within Italy Location within Liguria
- Coordinates: 44°4′N 8°1′E
- Country: Italy
- Region: Liguria
- Province: Imperia (IM)

Government
  - Mayor: Piero Raimondi

Area
  - Total: 10.86 km^{2} (4.19 sq mi)
- Elevation: 124 m (407 ft)

Population (31 December 2015)
  - Total: 557
  - Density: 51.3/km^{2} (133/sq mi)
- Demonym: Ranzesi
- Time zone: UTC+1 (CET)
  - Summer (DST): UTC+2 (CEST)
- Postal code: 18028
- Dialing code: 0183
- Website: Official website

Ranzo (Ligurian: Ranso) is a comune (municipality) in the Province of Imperia in the Italian region Liguria, located about 80 kilometres (50 mi) southwest of Genoa and about 20 kilometres (12 mi) north of Imperia.

Ranzo borders the following municipalities: Aquila di Arroscia, Borghetto d'Arroscia, Casanova Lerrone, Nasino, and Onzo.
