= Ortovero =

- Comune
- Comune di Ortovero
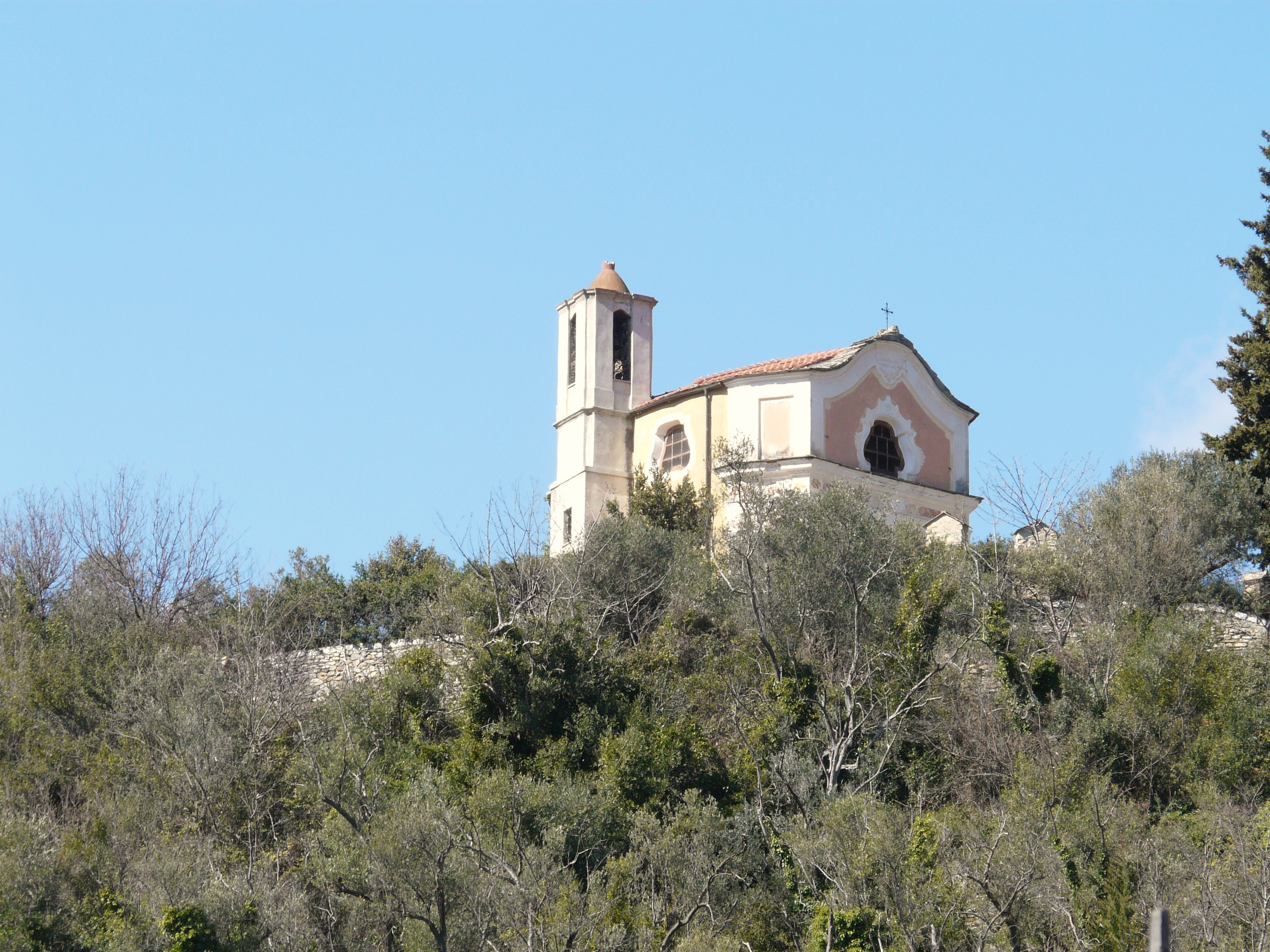
- Saint John the Baptist Church

- Location within Italy Location within Liguria
- Coordinates: 44°3′N 8°6′E
- Country: Italy
- Region: Liguria
- Province: Savona (SV)
- Frazioni: Campi, Pogli

Government
  - Mayor: Andrea Delfino

Area
  - Total: 9.66 km^{2} (3.73 sq mi)
- Elevation: 63 m (207 ft)

Population (31 December 2017)
  - Total: 1,566
  - Density: 162/km^{2} (420/sq mi)
- Demonym: Ortoveresi
- Time zone: UTC+1 (CET)
  - Summer (DST): UTC+2 (CEST)
- Postal code: 17037
- Dialing code: 0182
- Website: Official website

Ortovero (Ligurian: Utuê) is a comune (municipality) in the Province of Savona in the Italian region Liguria, located about 80 kilometres (50 mi) southwest of Genoa and about 40 kilometres (25 mi) southwest of Savona.

Ortovero borders the following municipalities: Albenga, Arnasco, Casanova Lerrone, Onzo, Vendone, and Villanova d'Albenga.
