= Monte Armetta =

Mountain in Italy

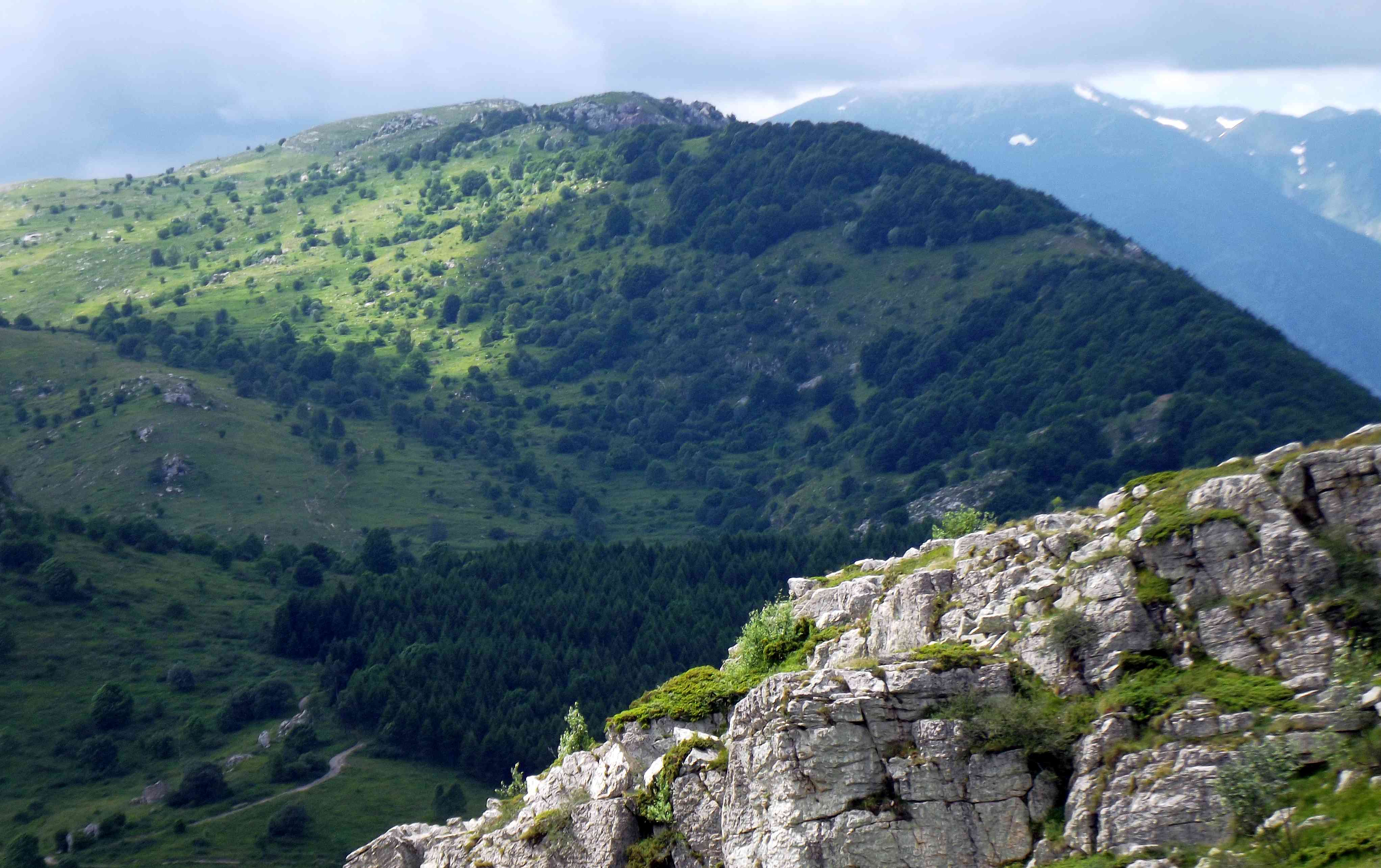
- Monte Armetta from Monte Dubasso

Highest point
- Elevation: 1,739 m (5,705 ft)
- Prominence: 805
- Isolation: 4.63 km (2.88 mi)
- Listing: Mountains of Italy
- Coordinates: 44°08′09″N 7°56′19″E

Naming
- English translation: Mountain of the small cave
- Language of name: Italian

Geography
- Location within Alps
- Location: Piedmont, Italy
- Parent range: Ligurian Alps

Climbing
- First ascent: ancestral
- Easiest route: hike

Monte Armetta is a mountain in Piedmont, northern Italy, part of the Alps. At an altitude of 1,739 metres it is the highest summit of the Ligurian Prealps.

== Etymology ==
According to the historian Emanuele Celesia the name Armetta comes from Hermes, but other scholars think that it's a diminutive of arma, a local term used in Liguria for cave.

== Geography ==
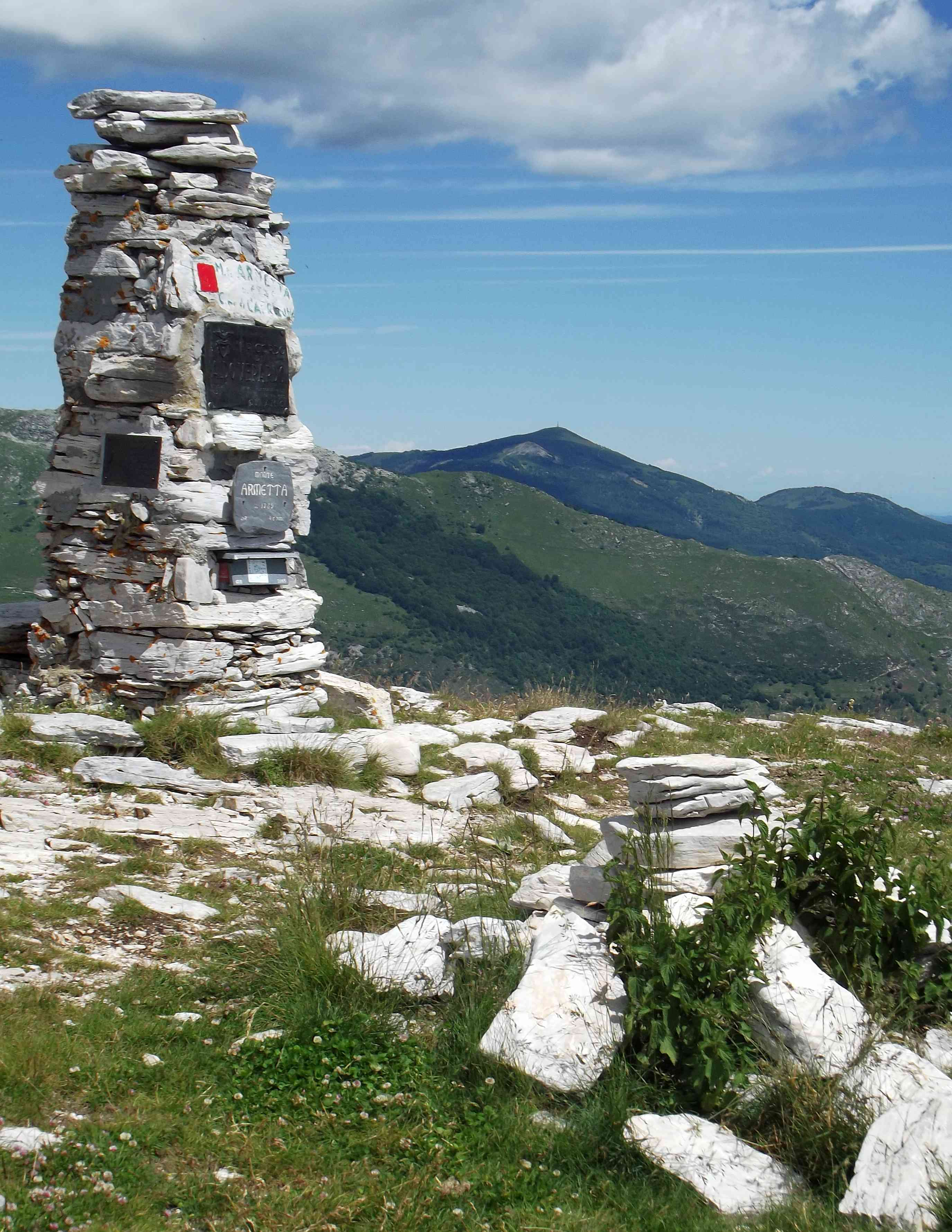
Summit cairn.

The mountain stands on the main chain of the Alps between Tanaro and Arroscia valleys. It belongs to the province of Cuneo, in Piedmont, and is located on the border between the municipalities of Ormea and Caprauna, not faraway from Liguria.

=== SOIUSA classification ===
According to the SOIUSA (International Standardized Mountain Subdivision of the Alps) the mountain can be classified in the following way:

- main part = Western Alps
- major sector = South Western Alps
- section = Ligurian Alps
- subsection = Prealpi Liguri
- supergroup = Catena Settepani-Carmo-Armetta
- group = Gruppo Galero-Armetta
- subgroup = Costiera Galero-Armetta
- code = I/A-1.I-A.3.a

=== Environment ===
The northern side of the mountain fells with overhanging cliffs towards Ormea, while its gentle southern slopes are covered of woods and pastures. On Monte Armetta, in spite of its not so high elevation, grow several typical mountain flowers as Leontopodium alpinum.

== Access to the summit ==
The mountain is accessible by off-road mountain paths and is crossed by the Alta Via dei Monti Liguri, a long-distance trail from Ventimiglia (province of Imperia) to Bolano (province of La Spezia).

It's also possible to reach monte Armetta from Madonna del Lago sanctuary (located several km from the centre of Alto) through a footpath with signposts, which also crosses Monte Dubasso (1,545 m).
