= Vendone =

- Comune
- Comune di Vendone
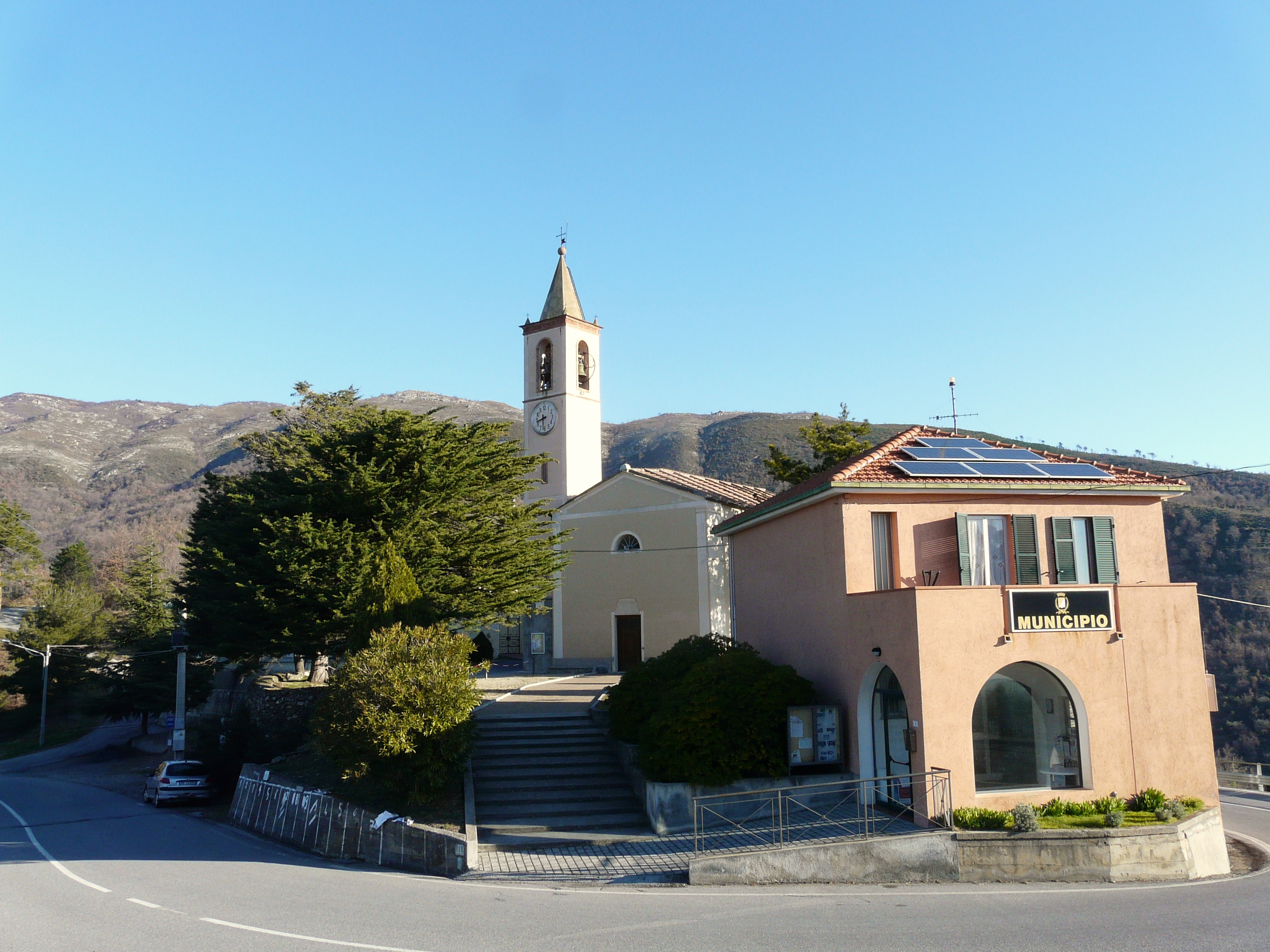
- Vendone

- Location within Italy Location within Liguria
- Coordinates: 44°5′N 8°4′E
- Country: Italy
- Region: Liguria
- Province: Savona (SV)

Government
  - Mayor: Pietro Revetria

Area
  - Total: 9.92 km^{2} (3.83 sq mi)
- Elevation: 398 m (1,306 ft)

Population (31 December 2015)
  - Total: 388
  - Density: 39.1/km^{2} (101/sq mi)
- Demonym: Vendonesi
- Time zone: UTC+1 (CET)
  - Summer (DST): UTC+2 (CEST)
- Postal code: 17030
- Dialing code: 0182
- Website: Official website

Vendone is a comune (municipality) in the Province of Savona in the Italian region Liguria, located about 80 kilometres (50 mi) southwest of Genoa and about 40 kilometres (25 mi) southwest of Savona.

Vendone borders the following municipalities: Arnasco, Castelbianco, Onzo, and Ortovero.

== See also ==
- Monte Peso Grande
