= Alto, Piedmont =

Alto
- Comune
- Comune di Alto
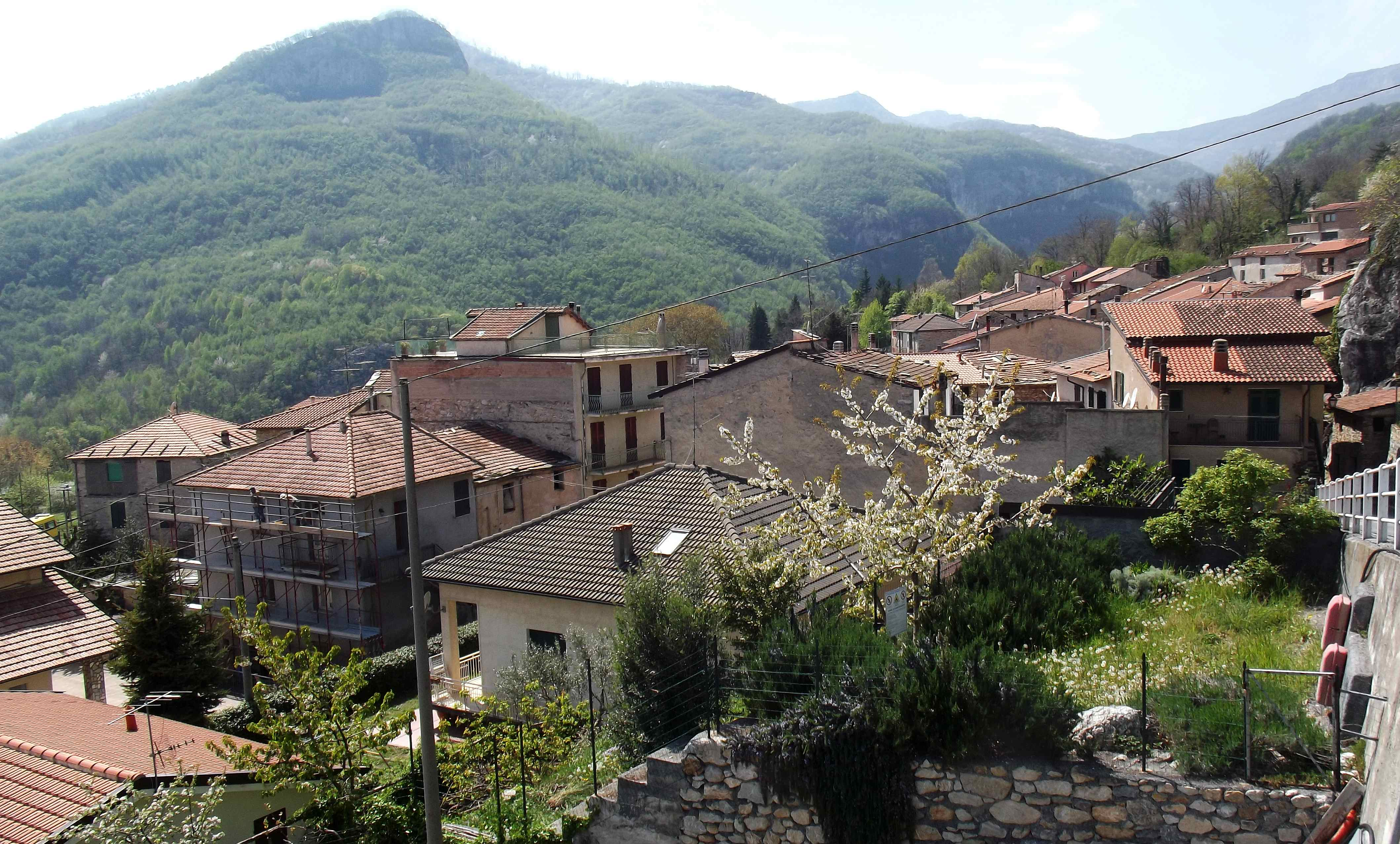

- Coat of arms

- Location of Alto in Italy Alto (Piedmont)
- Coordinates: 44°7′N 8°0′E
- Country: Italy
- Region: Piedmont
- Province: Cuneo (CN)

Government
  - Mayor: Renato Sicca

Area
  - Total: 7.46 km^{2} (2.88 sq mi)
- Elevation: 650 m (2,130 ft)

Population (31 August 2022)
  - Total: 139
  - Density: 18.6/km^{2} (48.3/sq mi)
- Demonym: Altesi
- Time zone: UTC+1 (CET)
  - Summer (DST): UTC+2 (CEST)
- Postal code: 12070
- Dialing code: 0174
- Patron saint: Michael the Archangel
- Saint day: 29 September
- Website: Official website

Alto is a comune (municipality) in the province of Cuneo in the northern Italian region Piedmont, located about 110 kilometres (68 mi) south of Turin and about 45 kilometres (28 mi) southeast of Cuneo.

Alto borders the following municipalities: Aquila di Arroscia, Caprauna, Nasino, and Ormea.
