= Nasino =

Nasino Naxin
- Comune
- Comune di Nasino
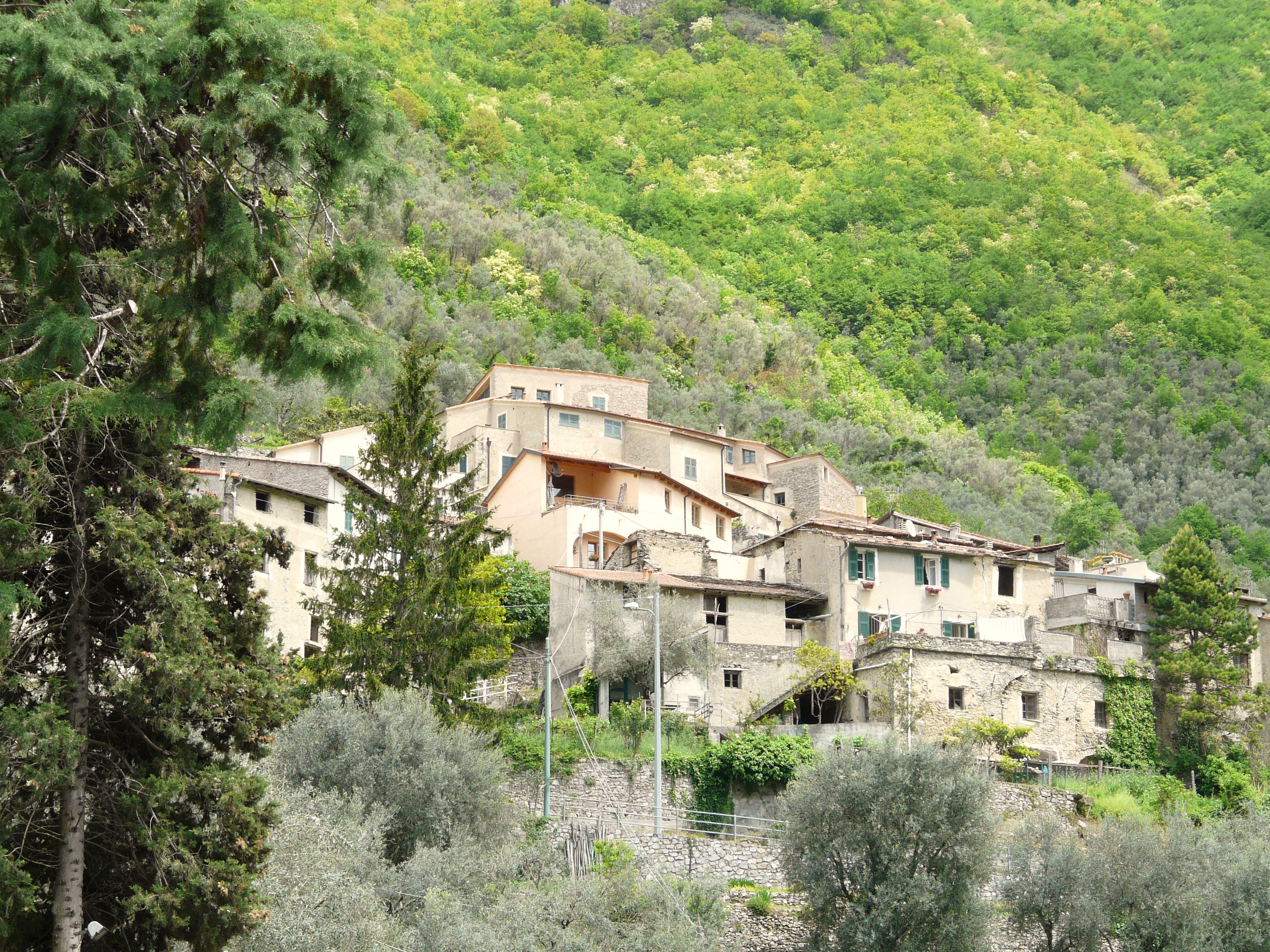
- Nasino

- Coat of arms

- Location within Italy Location within Liguria
- Coordinates: 44°7′N 8°2′E
- Country: Italy
- Region: Liguria
- Province: Savona (SV)

Government
  - Mayor: Roberto De Andreis

Area
  - Total: 22.18 km^{2} (8.56 sq mi)
- Elevation: 335 m (1,099 ft)

Population (31 May 2022)
  - Total: 174
  - Density: 7.84/km^{2} (20.3/sq mi)
- Demonym: Nasinesi
- Time zone: UTC+1 (CET)
  - Summer (DST): UTC+2 (CEST)
- Postal code: 17030
- Dialing code: 0182
- Website: Official website

Nasino (Ligurian: Naxin) is a comune (municipality) in the province of Savona in the Italian region Liguria, located about 80 kilometres (50 mi) southwest of Genoa and about 40 kilometres (25 mi) southwest of Savona.

Nasino borders the following municipalities: Alto, Aquila di Arroscia, Castelbianco, Erli, Garessio, Onzo, Ormea, and Ranzo.
