= Erli =

- Comune
- Comune di Erli
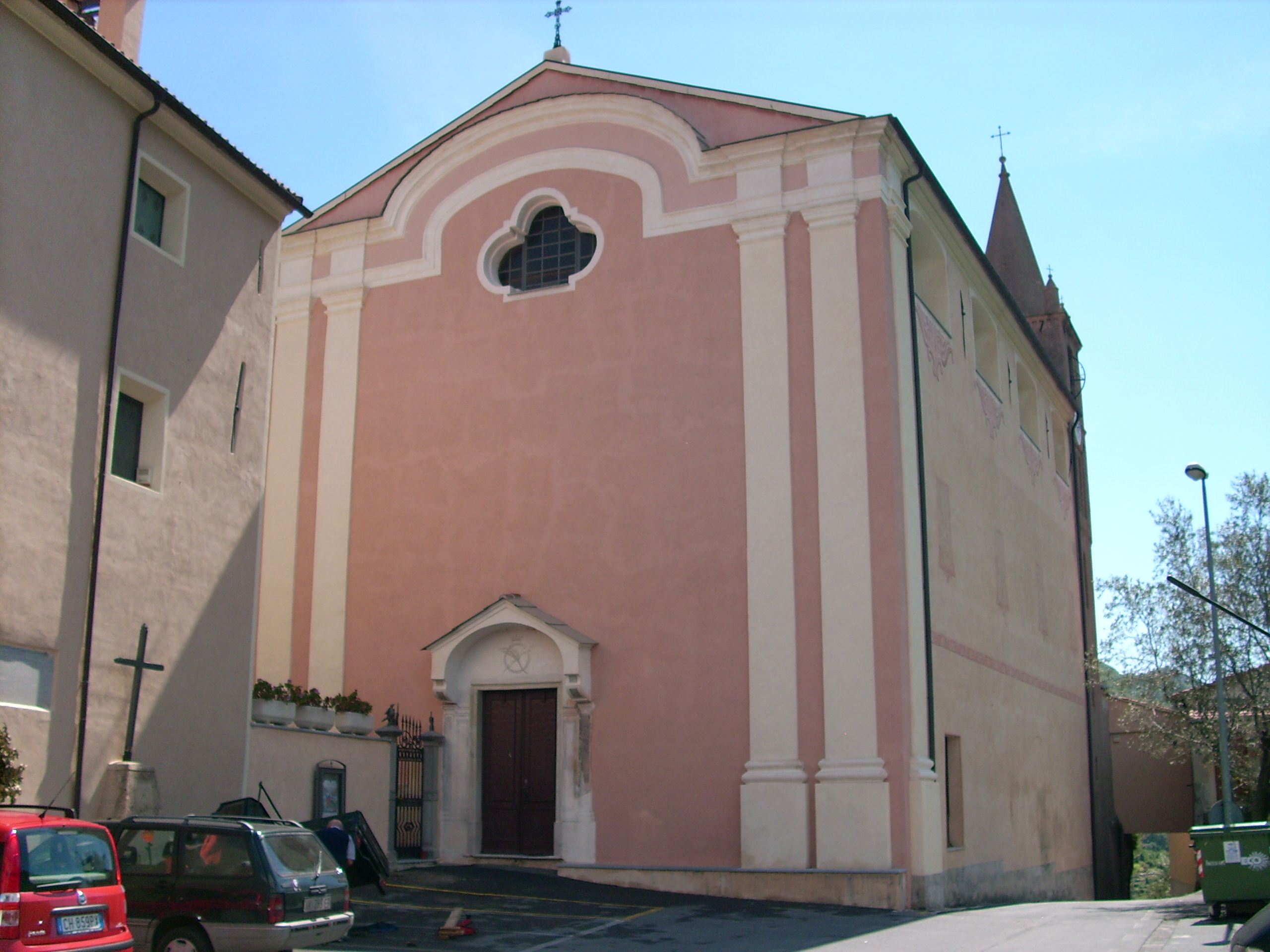
- Saint Catherine of Alexandria Church

- Location within Italy Location within Liguria
- Coordinates: 44°8′N 8°6′E
- Country: Italy
- Region: Liguria
- Province: Savona (SV)

Government
  - Mayor: Sergio Bruno

Area
  - Total: 16.73 km^{2} (6.46 sq mi)
- Elevation: 287 m (942 ft)

Population (31 May 2022)
  - Total: 206
  - Density: 12.3/km^{2} (31.9/sq mi)
- Demonym: Erlesi
- Time zone: UTC+1 (CET)
  - Summer (DST): UTC+2 (CEST)
- Postal code: 17030
- Dialing code: 0182
- Website: Official website

Erli is a comune (municipality) in the Province of Savona in the Italian region Liguria, located about 70 kilometres (43 mi) southwest of Genoa and about 35 kilometres (22 mi) southwest of Savona.

Erli borders the following municipalities: Castelbianco, Castelvecchio di Rocca Barbena, Garessio, Nasino, and Zuccarello.
