= Castelbianco =

- Comune
- Comune di Castelbianco
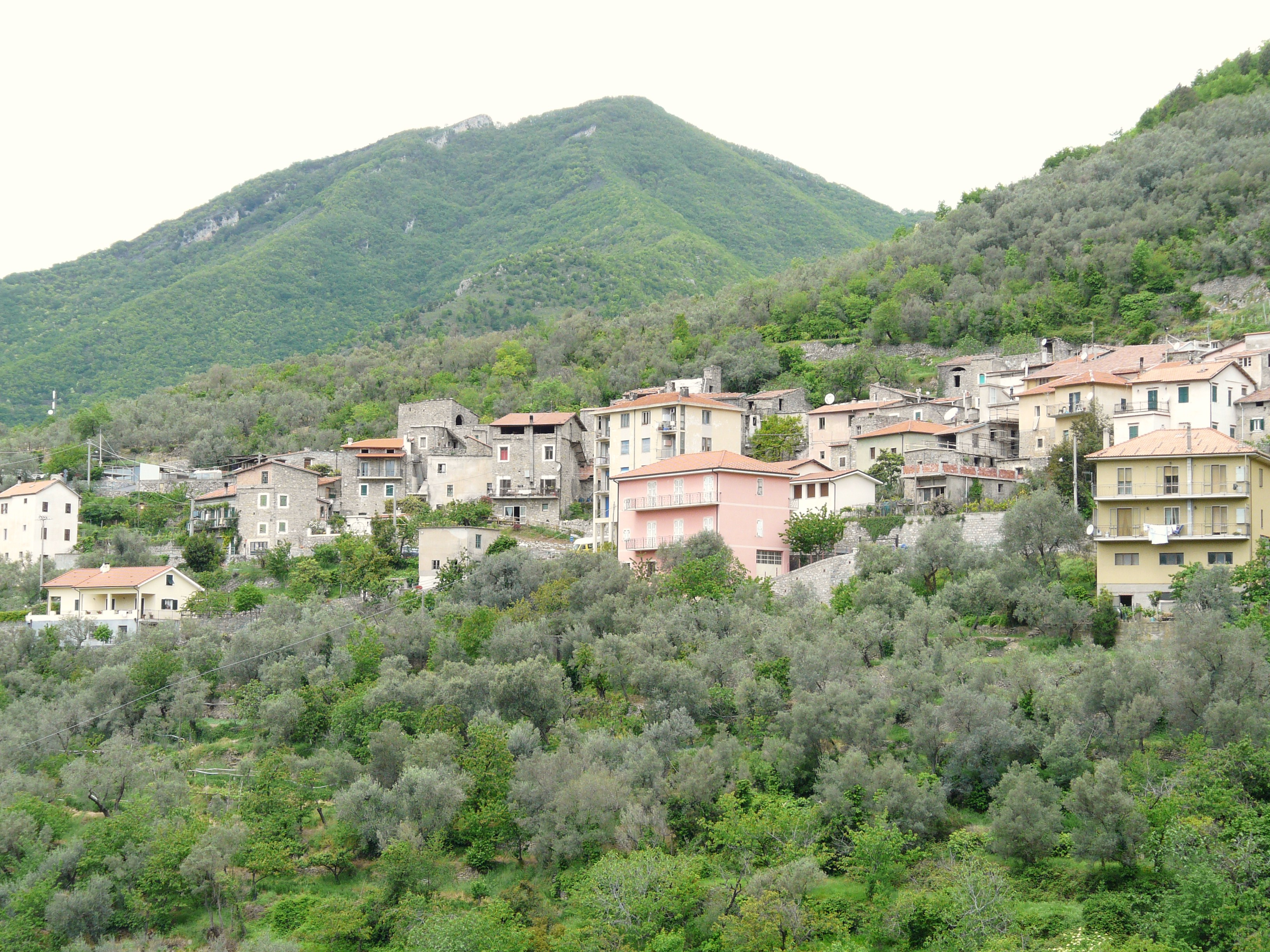
- Castelbianco

- Location within Italy Location within Liguria
- Coordinates: 44°7′N 8°4′E
- Country: Italy
- Region: Liguria
- Province: Savona (SV)
- Frazioni: Colletta, Oresine, Veravo, Vesallo, Teccio, Cianea

Government
  - Mayor: Valerio Scola

Area
  - Total: 14.7 km^{2} (5.7 sq mi)
- Elevation: 341 m (1,119 ft)

Population (30 June 2017)
  - Total: 321
  - Density: 21.8/km^{2} (56.6/sq mi)
- Demonym: Castelbianchesi
- Time zone: UTC+1 (CET)
  - Summer (DST): UTC+2 (CEST)
- Postal code: 17030
- Dialing code: 0182
- Website: Official website

Castelbianco (Ligurian: Castregianco) is a comune (municipality) in the Province of Savona in the Italian region Liguria, located about 80 kilometres (50 mi) southwest of Genoa and about 40 kilometres (25 mi) southwest of Savona.

Castelbianco borders the following municipalities: Arnasco, Erli, Nasino, Onzo, Vendone, and Zuccarello.
