= Arnasco =

- Comune
- Comune di Arnasco
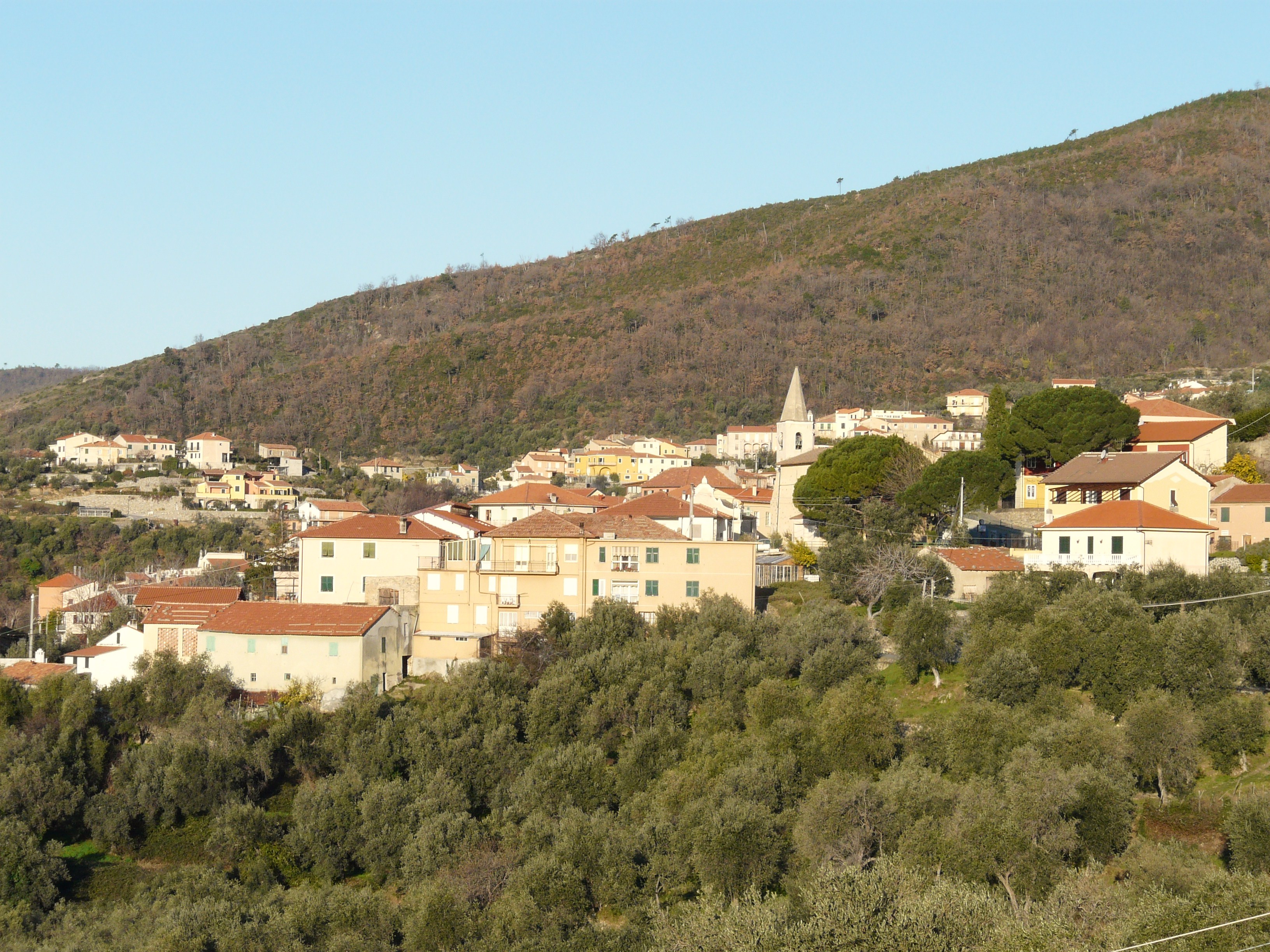
- Arnasco

- Coat of arms

- Location of Arnasco in Italy Arnasco (Liguria)
- Coordinates: 44°5′N 8°6′E
- Country: Italy
- Region: Liguria
- Province: Savona (SV)

Government
  - Mayor: Alfredino Gallizia

Area
  - Total: 6.0 km^{2} (2.3 sq mi)
- Elevation: 250 m (820 ft)

Population (30 April 2017)
  - Total: 625
  - Density: 100/km^{2} (270/sq mi)
- Demonym: Arnaschesi
- Time zone: UTC+1 (CET)
  - Summer (DST): UTC+2 (CEST)
- Postal code: 17032
- Dialing code: 0182

Arnasco (Ligurian: Arnascho or Arnasco) is a comune (municipality) in the Province of Savona in the Italian region of Liguria, located about 80 kilometres (50 mi) southwest of Genoa and about 40 kilometres (25 mi) southwest of Savona.

Arnasco borders the following municipalities: Albenga, Castelbianco, Cisano sul Neva, Ortovero, Vendone, and Zuccarello.

== Twin towns ==
Arnasco is twinned with:

- Brading, United Kingdom
- Río Cauto, Cuba
