= Caprauna =

- Comune
- Comune di Caprauna
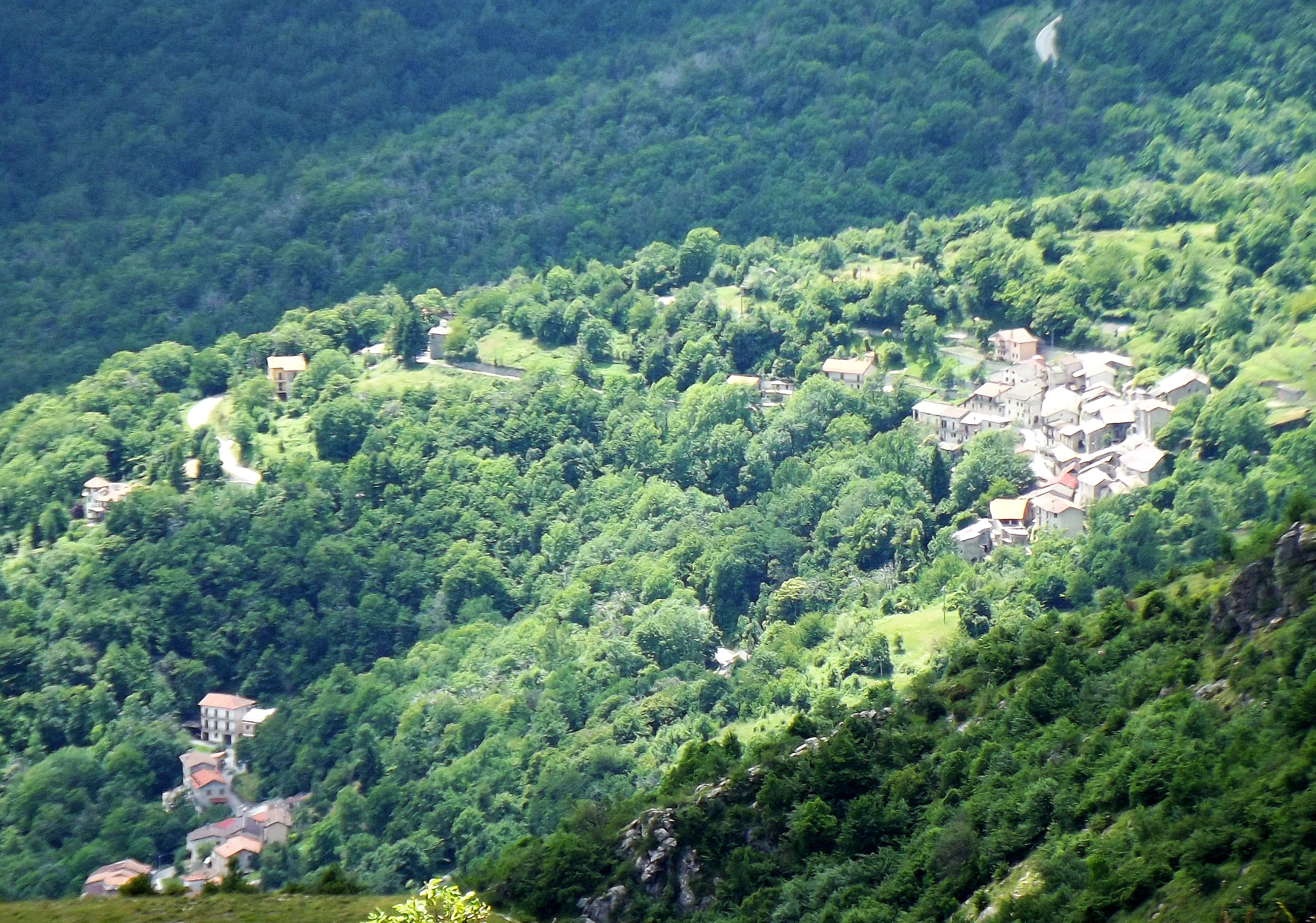
- Panorama from Monte Dubasso

- Location within Italy Location within Piedmont
- Coordinates: 44°7′N 7°57′E
- Country: Italy
- Region: Piedmont
- Province: Cuneo (CN)
- Frazioni: Poggio, Chiazzuola, Ruora, Case Sottane

Government
  - Mayor: Paolo Ferraris

Area
  - Total: 11.5 km^{2} (4.4 sq mi)
- Elevation: 1,000 m (3,300 ft)

Population (31 May 2021)
  - Total: 94
  - Density: 8.2/km^{2} (21/sq mi)
- Demonym: Capraunesi
- Time zone: UTC+1 (CET)
  - Summer (DST): UTC+2 (CEST)
- Postal code: 12070
- Dialing code: 0174
- Website: Official website

Caprauna is a comune (municipality) in the Province of Cuneo in the Italian region Piedmont, located about 110 kilometres (68 mi) south of Turin and about 45 kilometres (28 mi) southeast of Cuneo.

Caprauna borders the following municipalities: Alto, Aquila di Arroscia, Armo, Borghetto d'Arroscia, Ormea, and Pieve di Teco.

== See also ==
- Monte Armetta
- Monte della Guardia
