= Diano =

Diano may refer to:

== Places ==
- Diano Arentino, municipality of the Province of Imperia, Liguria
- Diano Castello, municipality of the Province of Imperia, Liguria
- Diano d'Alba, municipality of the Province of Cuneo, Piedmont
- Diano Marina, municipality of the Province of Imperia, Liguria
- Diano San Pietro, municipality of the Province of Imperia, Liguria
- Diano, the ancient name of Teggiano, a municipality in the province of Salerno (Campania)
- Vallo di Diano, a geographical region of the Province of Salerno (Campania)

== People ==
- Diano (footballer) (born 1981), Brazilian footballer
- Diano (surname), Italian surname

== See also ==
- Diana (disambiguation)
- Diane (disambiguation)
- Diani Beach
