= San Pietro (creek) =

Stream in Liguria, Italy

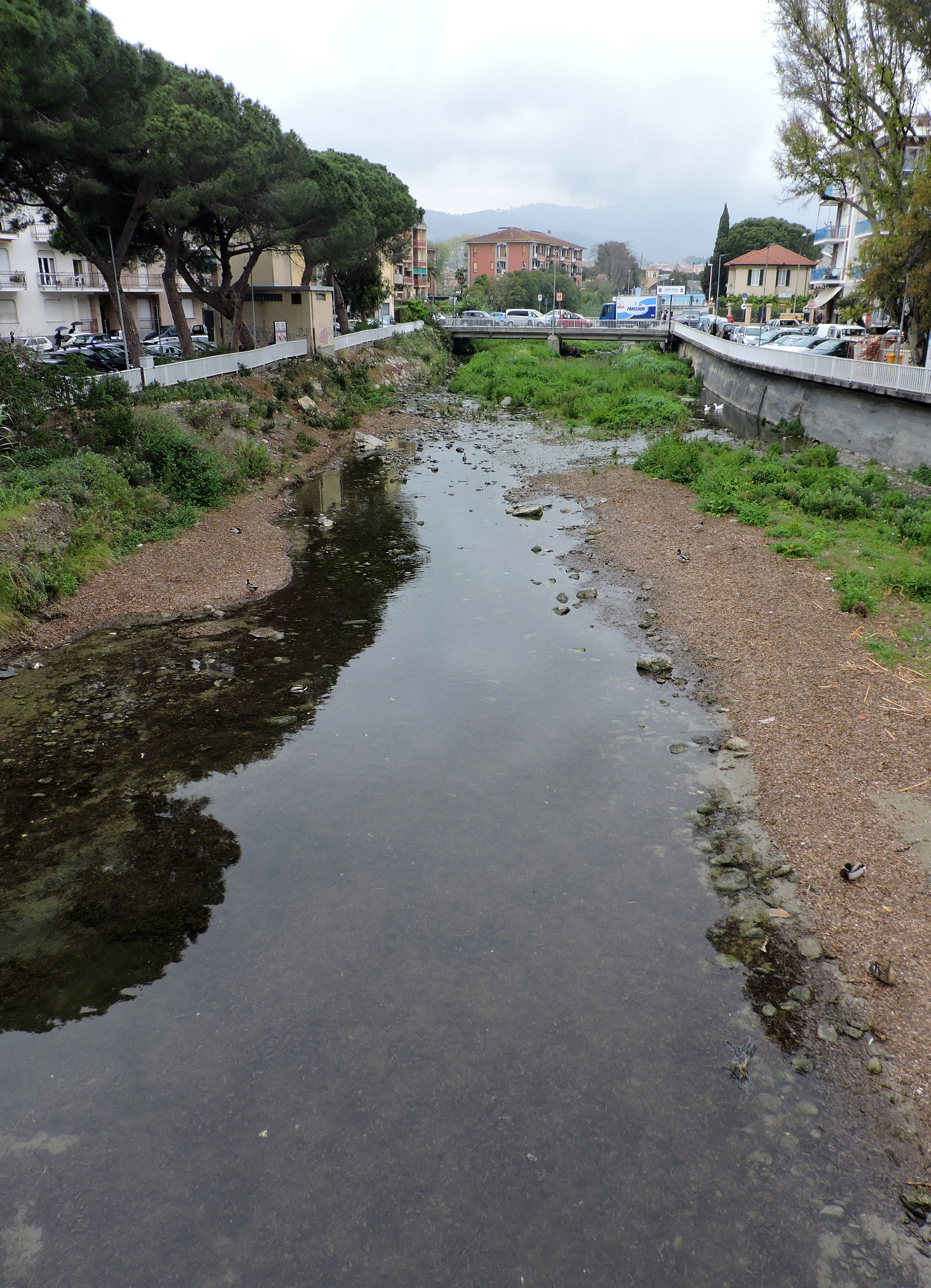

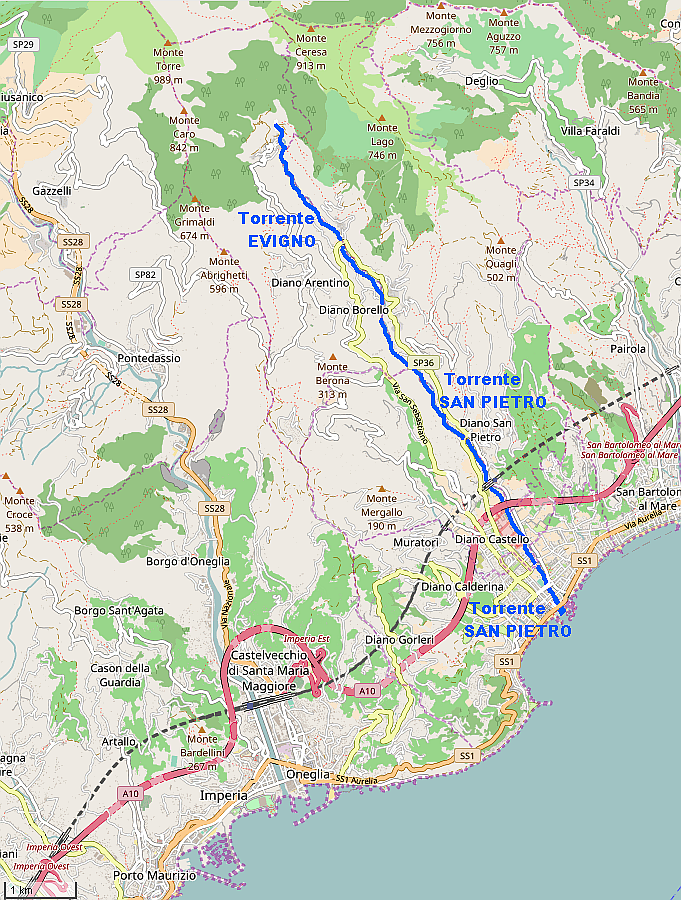

Location
- Country: Italy

Physical characteristics
- Source
  - location: SE slopes of Monte Torre (Ligurian Alps)
- Mouth: Ligurian Sea
  - location: Diano Marina (IM)
  - coordinates: 43°54′37.76″N 8°05′11.08″E
  - elevation: 0 m (0 ft)
- Length: 10.26 km (6.38 mi)
- Basin size: 18.02 km^{2} (6.96 sq mi)

The San Pietro or Evigno is a 10.2-kilometre (6.3 mi) stream of Liguria (Italy).

== Geography ==
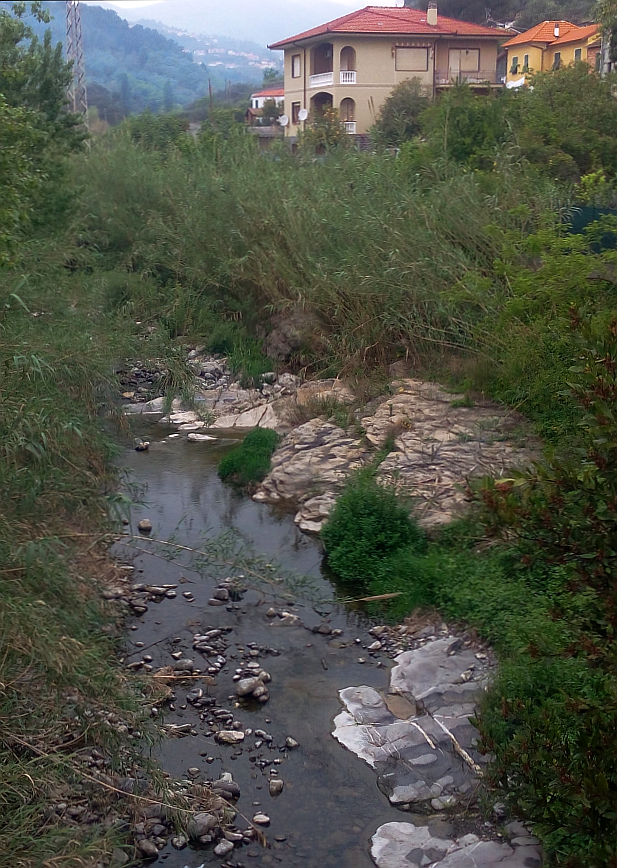
The creek in Diano San Pietro

The creek is formed close to the village of Evigno (comune of Diano Arentino) from the union of several streams descending the south-eastern slopes of monte Torre (990 m). Going SSW, a direction the creek will keep till to its mouth, it reaches Diano San Pietro where it gets from the left rio Beste, its main tributary. San Pietro watercourse marks for a long stretch the border between the comuni of Diano Castello (West side) and Diano San Pietro. Not faraway from its mouth, which is located in comune of Diano Marina, the San Pietro is crossed by Genoa–Ventimiglia railway, Autostrada dei Fiori and State highway nr.1 (Via Aurelia).

The valley of San Pietro is also called Valle Dianese and borders to the West with Impero valley, to the North for a short stretch with Merula valley and to the East with Steria valley.

San Pietro basin (18 km2) is totally included in the Province of Imperia.

=== Main tributaries ===
- Right hand:
  - rio Cuni,
  - rio Olivette,
  - rio de Murte;
- left hand:
  - rio Cian della Ciappa,
  - rio di Camporotondo,
  - rio Zuccamleo,
  - rio Beste.

== Fishing ==
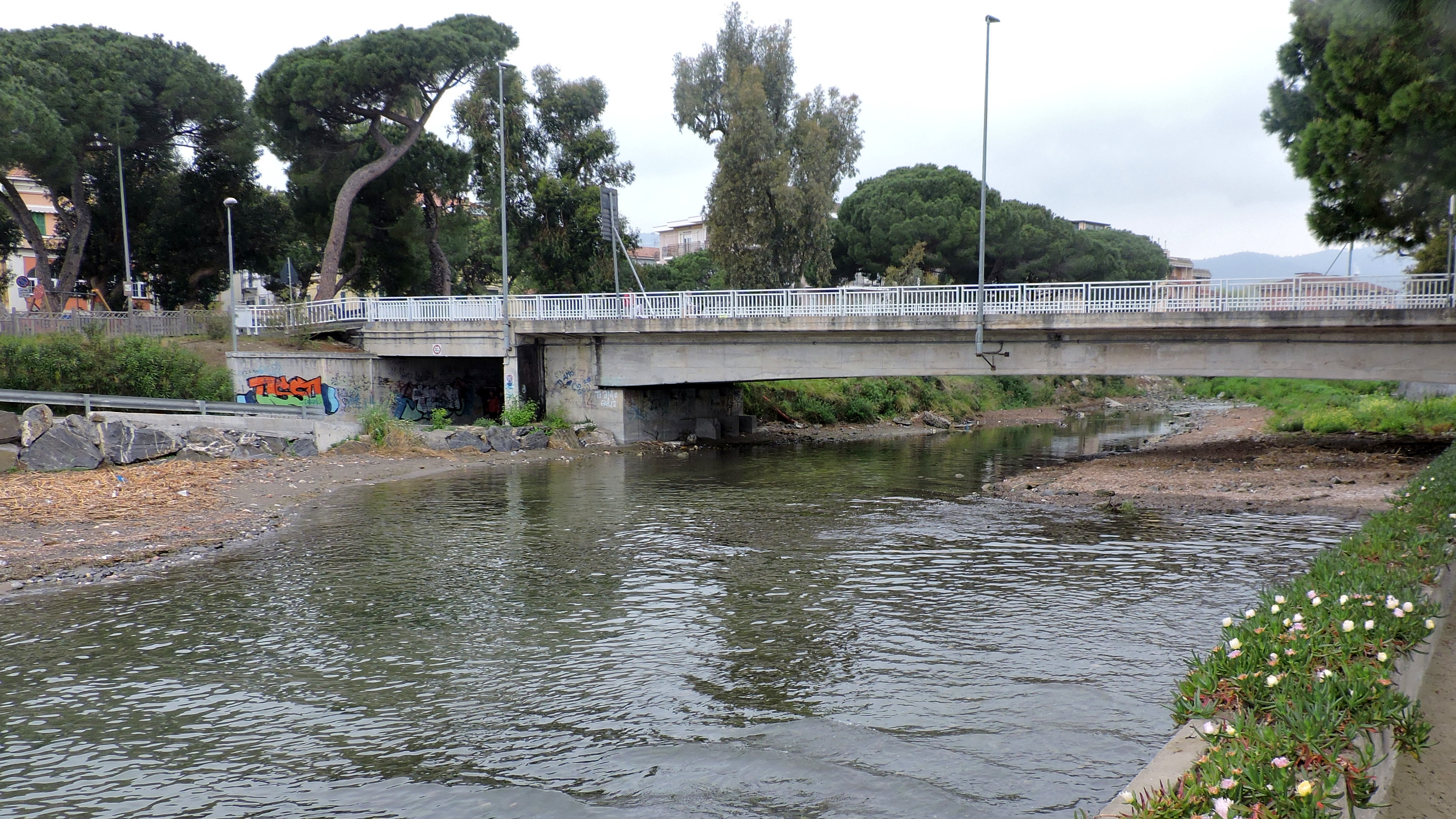
San Pietro mouth

The San Pietro is not considered very suitable for fishing; between Roncagli and Diano San Pietro among its scarce fish fauna cyprinis tend to prevail.

== See also ==
- List of rivers of Italy

Media related to Torrente San Pietro at Wikimedia Commons
