= Decauville factory in Diano Marina =

Railway track manufacturer

Coordinates: 43.90768°N 8.084328°E

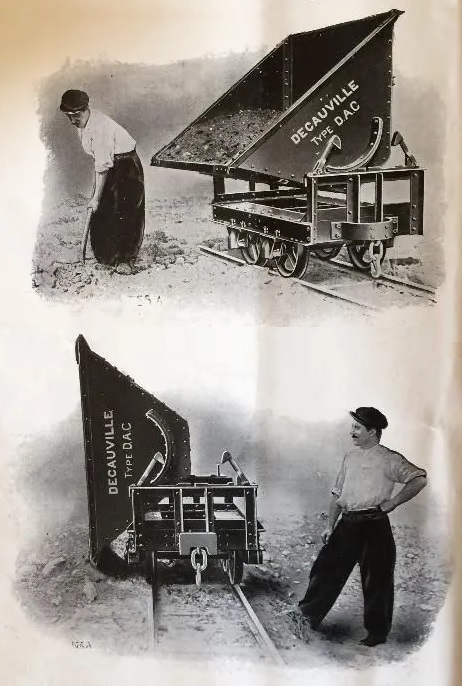
Decauville V skip waggons

The Decauville factory in Diano Marina produced prefabricated narrow gauge railway track and rolling stock from 1889 to 1895 in Diano Marina, Italy.

== History ==
The Etablissements Decauville ainé, a French manufacturer of railway material, bought 4 hectares of land in Diano Marina of the Italian Riviera about 90 kilometres (56 mi) southwest of Genoa, to build a new production facility for railway material. The factory was established on the site of a former cement factory between the Nice-Genoa railway line and the sea. The main objective, was to minimise the cost for tolls and taxes, when customs levied 120 FF per tonne of imported portable track.^{p. 18} The company was set-up the factory on 13 November 1889. It reserved itself the right to acquire the establishment either on his own account or on behalf of another person or company designated by the company.

The factory specialised in the manufacture of portable railway track, portable bridges and various other devices are also manufactured there. This workshop employed 50 workers and the motive power was provided by a 20 hp locomobile.

The Diano-Marina plant was decommissioned (valued at 110,000 Francs) in 1895, when the Decauville factory in Val-Saint-Lambert in Belgium was set-up on 1 January 1895.^{p. 54} Most of the machines of the Italian factory were exported to Russia, to be used in a Franco-Russian joint venture for building narrow gauge equipment, while the manager of the Italian factory, Mr Ferrari, took over a position as director in Val-Saint-Lambert.^{p. 88-89}
