= Steria (creek) =

Stream in Liguria, Italy

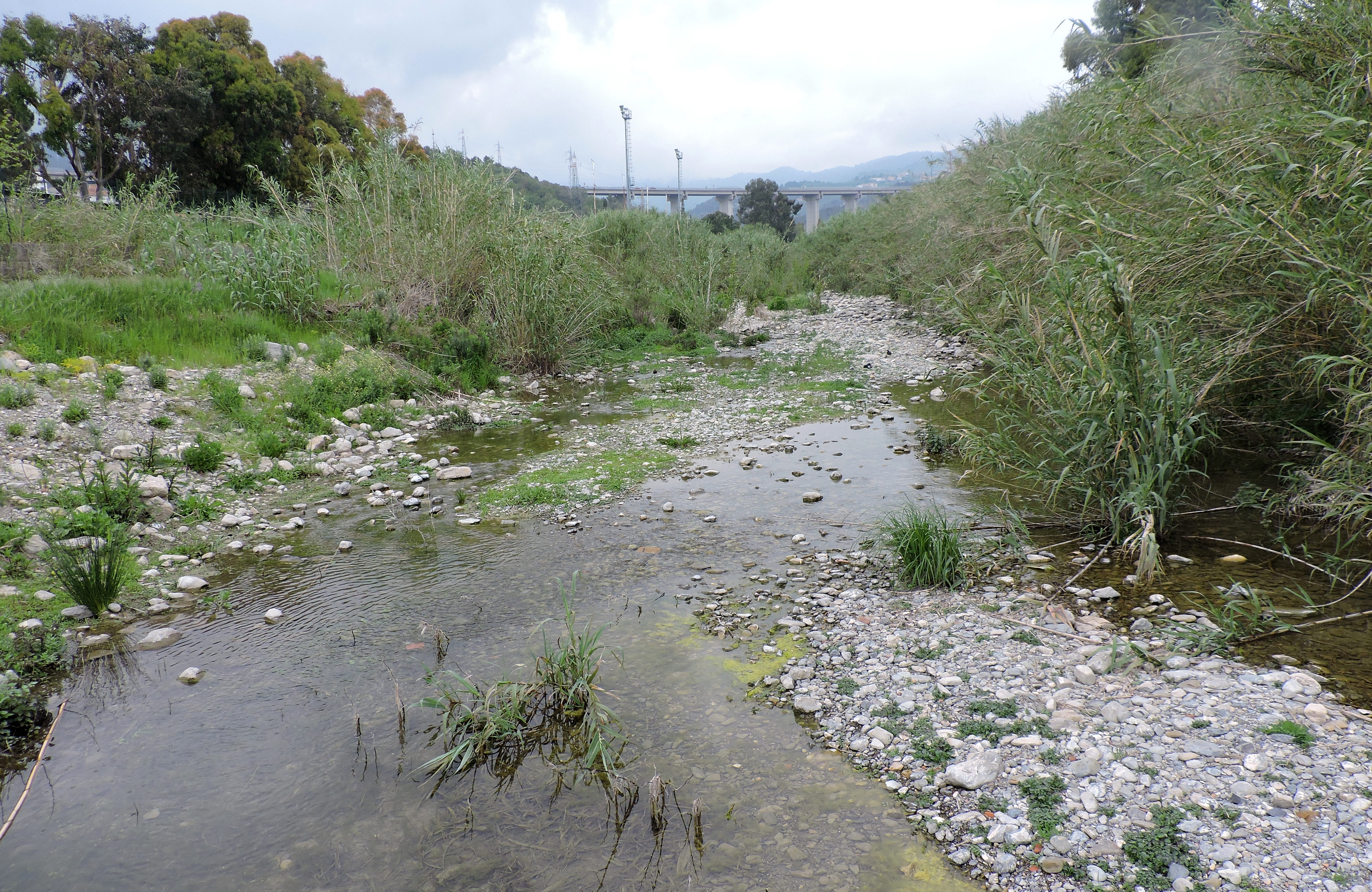

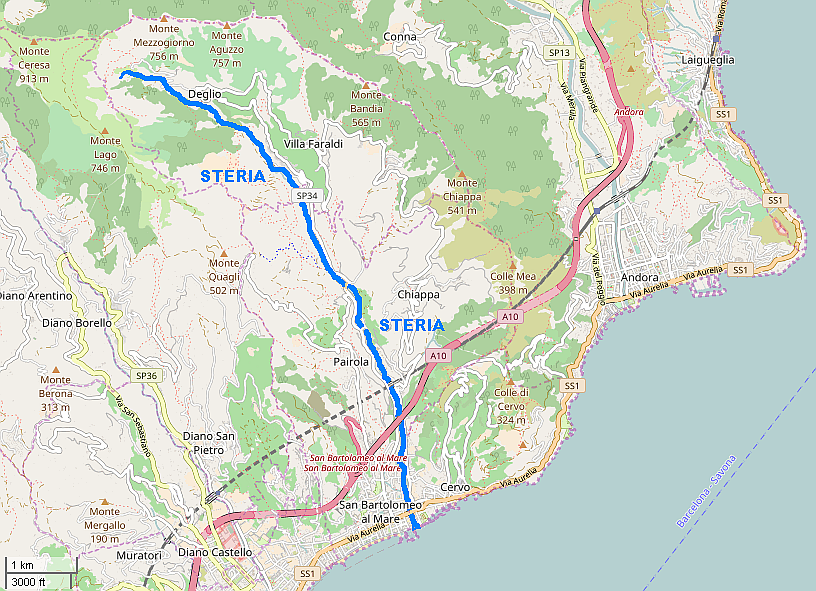

Location
- Country: Italy

Physical characteristics
- Source
  - location: Monte Lago (Ligurian Alps)
- Mouth: Ligurian Sea
  - location: between San Bartolomeo al Mare and Cervo (IM)
  - coordinates: 43.9211°N 8.1073°E
  - elevation: 0 m (0 ft)
- Length: 9.6 km (6.0 mi)
- Basin size: 21.97 km^{2} (8.48 mi^{2})

The Steria or Cervo is a 9.6-kilometre (6.0 mi) stream of Liguria (Italy).

== Geography ==
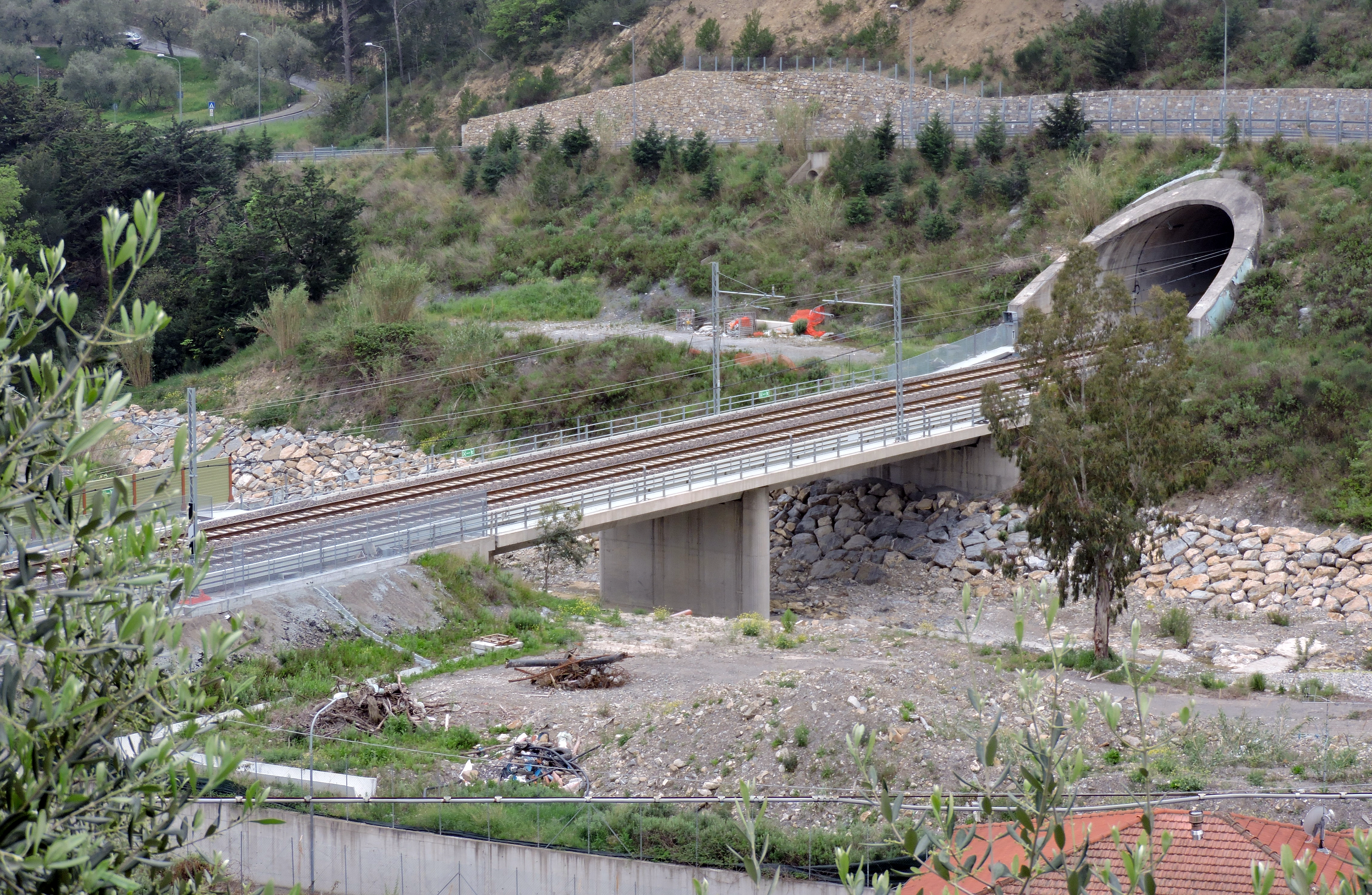
Railway bridge on the Steria

The creek is formed at Monte Lago (Ligurian Prealps, 774 m) in comune of Villa Faraldi, and flows at first heading South-East; near Riva Faraldi it turns South and receives from the left hand Fontana and Paniga creeks. After leaving Villa Faraldi it enters San Bartolomeo al Mare municipality; between Molino del Fico and borgata Freschi gets the waters of its main tributary, torrente di Tovo. The Steria marks then the border between the municipalities of San Bartolomeo al Mare (West) and Cervo following southwards and, after being crossed by Genoa–Ventimiglia railway, Autostrada A10 and Aurelia national road, ends its course in the Ligurian Sea.

Steria basin (22 km2) is totally included in the Province of Imperia. Its valley borders to the West with San Pietro valley, to the North and East with Merula valley.

=== Main tributaries ===
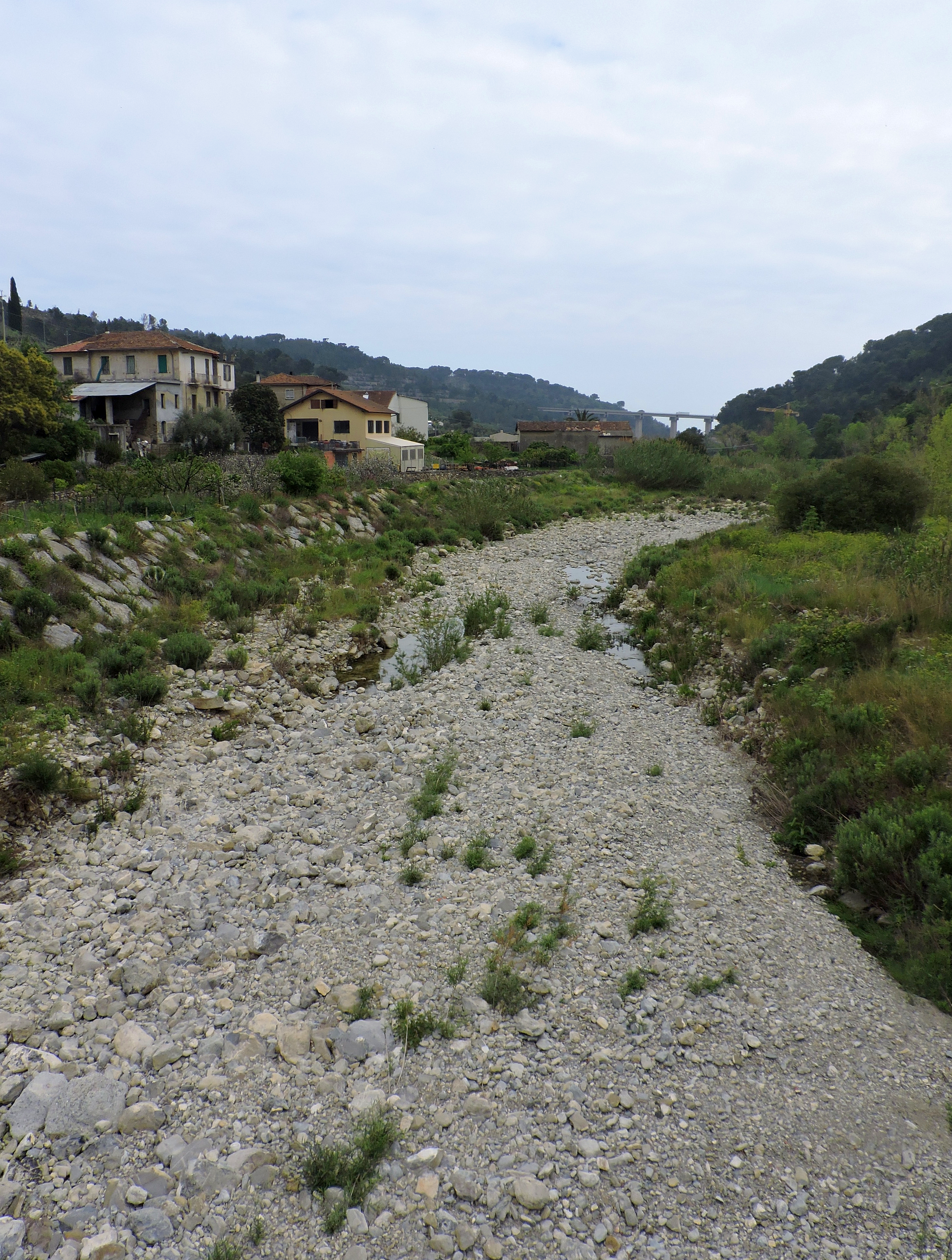
Dry Steria near Richieri

- Right hand:
  - rio Sorba,
  - rio Campanaudo,
  - rio Roccafessa,
  - rio del Bosco.
- Left hand:
  - rio Fontana,
  - rio Paniga,
  - torrente del Tovo: rises not faraway from Tovo Faraldi and ends in the Steria nearby the village of Freschi,
  - rio Gazzelli.

== Fishing ==
The Steria is considered suitable for fishing trouts in its upper course, while going downstream Cyprinidae tend to prevail.

== See also ==
- List of rivers of Italy

Media related to Steria at Wikimedia Commons
