= Diano Marina =

Municipality in Liguria, Italy

Diano Marina A Maina de Dian
- Comune
- Comune di Diano Marina
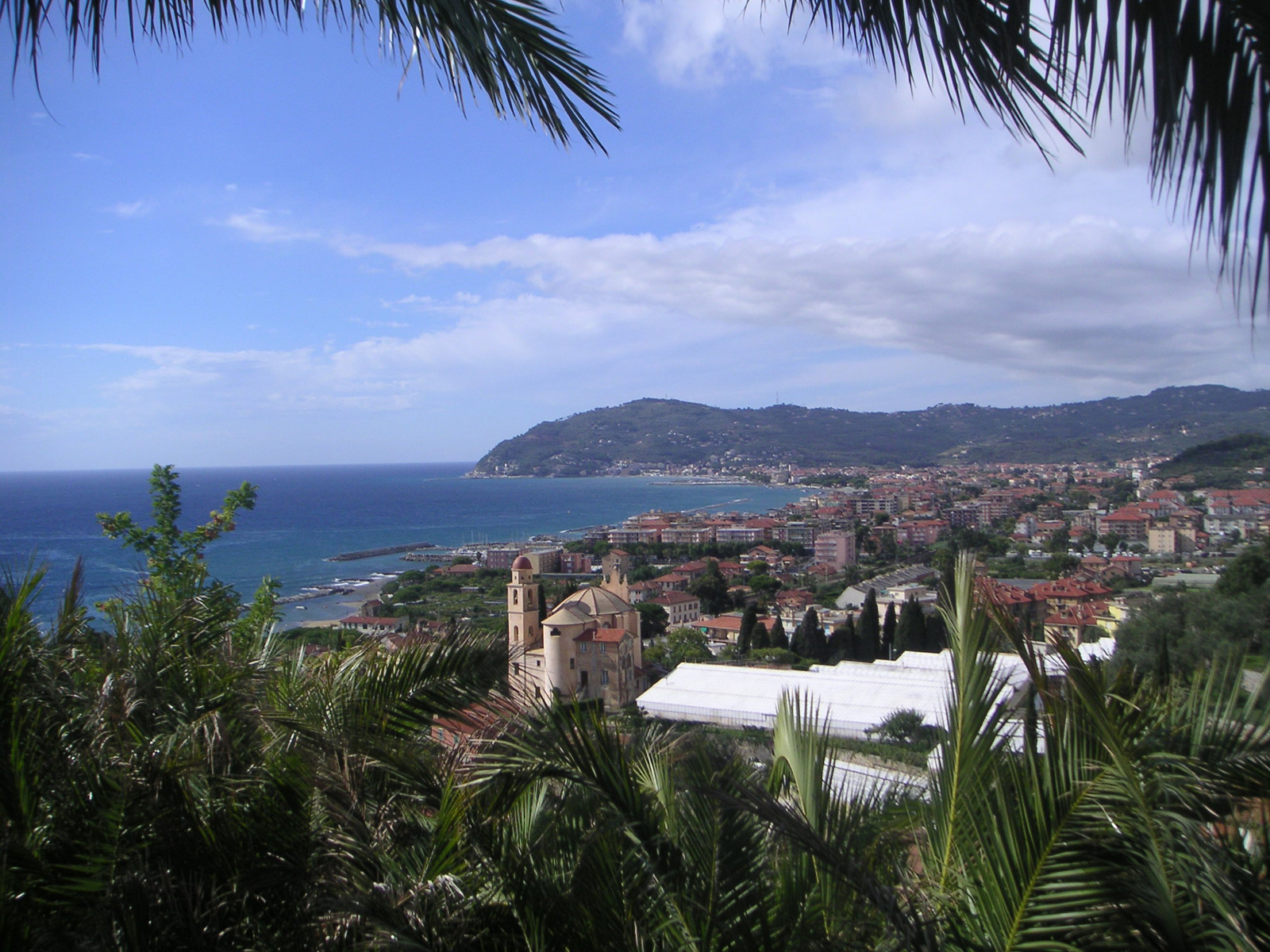
- View of Diano Marina

- Map of the municipality (comune) of Diano Marina (province of Imperia, region Liguria, Italy)

- Location of Diano Marina in Italy Diano Marina (Liguria)
- Coordinates: 43°55′N 8°5′E
- Country: Italy
- Region: Liguria
- Province: Province of Imperia (IM)
- Founded: 1861
- Frazioni: Diano Calderina, Diano Gorleri, Diano Serreta, Muratori

Government
  - Mayor: Giacomo Chiappori (Lega Nord)

Area
  - Total: 6.67 km^{2} (2.58 sq mi)
- Elevation: 4 m (13 ft)

Population (30 June 2017)
  - Total: 5,915
  - Density: 887/km^{2} (2,300/sq mi)
- Demonym: Dianesi
- Time zone: UTC+1 (CET)
  - Summer (DST): UTC+2 (CEST)
- Postal code: 18013
- Dialing code: 0183
- ISTAT code: 008027
- Patron saint: Our Lady of Mount Carmel
- Saint day: 16 July
- Website: comune.dianomarina.im.it

Diano Marina (Ligurian: A Maina de Dian, or simply Dian) is a comune (municipality) in the Province of Imperia in the Italian region of Liguria, located about 90 kilometres (56 mi) southwest of Genoa and about 5 kilometres (3.1 mi) northeast of Imperia.

== Geography ==
The municipality of Diano Marina contains the frazioni (subdivisions, mainly villages and hamlets) Diano Calderina, Diano Serreta, Diano Gorleri, Diano Arentino, and borgata Muratori. It borders the following municipalities: Diano Castello, Diano San Pietro, Imperia, and San Bartolomeo al Mare.

Diano Marina is one of the few municipalities along the Ligurian coast with long sandy beaches. The beach season is from 15 May until 15 September. Outside of this season, most of the beaches are accessible to the public. It is also known for its streets lined with orange trees, and is referred to as the "Citta degli aranci" (City of the orange trees).

== History ==
The origin of Diano Marina dates back to the Upper Paleolithic era and the Iron Age. Various discoveries have been made in the area, such as cinerary urns belonging to a necropolis, thus supporting the theory of a probable prehistoric origin of the village. The first permanent settlement, inhabited by Ingauni Ligurian, dates back to the Bronze Age.

Around 200 BC, the Roman Empire, engaged in the conquest of the Ligurian region, built a small village on the site, called Lucus Bormani, originally dedicated to the god Bormo or Bormano. According to some historians, the current name of Diano derives from the Romans who wanted to convert the local population to the cult of Diana, goddess of the hunt, weeding out the prehistoric god Bomano previously revered; this hypothesis has been disputed by other historians, however. Of the ancient Roman presence, some buildings still remain, discovered during excavations adjacent to the sports field.

According to some sources, basic Christian education was provided around the 1st century by the saints Nazarius and Celsus, to whom the Dianese population later dedicated a small church near the sports field. Between the 9th and 10th centuries, the settlement suffered invasions by Saracen pirates, along with other coastal towns.

The village experienced a boost to its economy when Benedictine monks from Piedmont introduced the cultivation of olive trees in the 11th century, which consequently led to the production of olive oil. During the same century, the Dianese territory became a feudal dominion of the Marquises of Clavesana until 1177, when a free and autonomous municipality was formed. In 1199, the Communitas Diani was established, merging several settlements of the Diano valley, and in 1228 it became an integral part of the Republic of Genoa.

By the 16th century, the community was made up of about sixty families and it eventually became the main commercial base for olive oil in the whole western Ligurian Riviera; the Dianese harbor, due to its natural shape, was a strategic point for the goods that reached the main European ports by sea. This lucrative trade had to contend with increasingly frequent pirate raids, forcing the Genoese senate to erect fortifications and watchtowers along the territory, with the substantial help of the local population.

After the fall of the Republic of Genoa in 1797, the new municipality of Diano Marina rejoined the Ligurian Republic. Annexed to the First French Empire from 1805 to 1814, it became part of the Department of Montenotte.

In 1815, the territory was incorporated into the Kingdom of Sardinia, as established by the Congress of Vienna in 1814, and subsequently added to the Kingdom of Italy in 1861. In 1871, the hamlet of Paradisi was detached from Diano Castello and aggregated to the municipality of Diano Marina.

The earthquake and subsequent tsunami of 23 February 1887 caused considerable structural damage to houses and monuments, and the loss of several lives; the Piedmontese engineer Giacomo Pisani is responsible for the design of the new town plan following the disaster. The construction of the Genoa–Ventimiglia railway and the consequent opening of a local station in 1872 has attracted tourists to Diano Marina, especially in the 1950s and 1960s.

In 1923, the municipalities of Cervo, San Bartolomeo al Mare, Diano Arentino, Diano Borello, Diano Calderina, Diano Castello, Diano San Pietro, and Villa Faraldi were added to Diano Marina; in 1925, the communities of Cervo, Diano Arentino, Diano Castello, and Diano San Pietro were reconstituted as separate municipalities.

== Monuments and places of interest ==
=== Religious architecture ===
- Parish church of Sant'Antonio in the town centre, near the Diano Marina promenade. The current structure is the result of new construction that took place between 1862 and 1865.
- Church of Nazarius and Celsus in the town centre. The building is located in the archaeological area of Prato Fiorito, where the ancient Roman settlements of Lucus Bormani were found. It was built on top of other structures from the Roman period, presenting an intricate architectural style of walls from different eras. Since 2005, the archaeological site has been subject to excavation projects directed by the International Institute of Ligurian Studies, with authorization from the Ministry of Cultural Heritage and Activities. So far, about eighty burials have been discovered.
- Oratorio della Santissima Annunziata, located adjacent to the port of Diano Marina, is a building dating back most probably to the Middle Ages, but numerous restorations carried out in the following centuries have altered or modified its original structure.
- Parish church of San Giacomo in the hamlet of Diano Calderina. It contains a polyptych from 1514 by an unknown painter and a canvas of the Annunciation by Domenico Fiasella, both now kept in the diocesan museum of Albenga.
- Parish church of San Nicola in the hamlet of Diano Gorleri.
- Church of Sant'Anna in the hamlet of Diano Serreta. The church was built in the 17th century by the Casalmiglias as a family chapel. The marble altar dates back to 1675.
- Church of San Biagio in the hamlet of Muratori.

=== Civil architecture ===
- Palazzo del Parco. The building was built in the mid-19th century and is home to the "Angiolo Silvio Novaro" civic library and the civic museum.
- Palazzo Maglione, former seat of the Dianese town hall.
- Villa Scarsella. In ancient times, it served as a Dominican convent, built in the 16th century, along the road leading to Diano Castello. Since the 1970s, it has been home to a state primary school.

=== Military architecture ===
- Torre di sant'Erasmo, at the western end of Diano Marina, was incorporated in 1836 into a fort and subsequently transformed into a private residence and is thus no longer recognizable as a former military structure.
- Torre dell'Alpicella, or Alpixella, located at the highest point (267 m asl) of Capo Berta, consisting of a circular fortification with rough stone walls and a conical trunk dating back to the 14th-15th centuries.

== Culture ==
=== Education ===
- "Angiolo Silvio Novaro" public library. Established in 1957, it resides on the first floor of the Palazzo del Parco building as of 1965.
- Public Museum of Diano Marina. Housed in the Palazzo del Parco, it includes archaeological, Unification, and mineralogical sections, as well as a multimedia room.

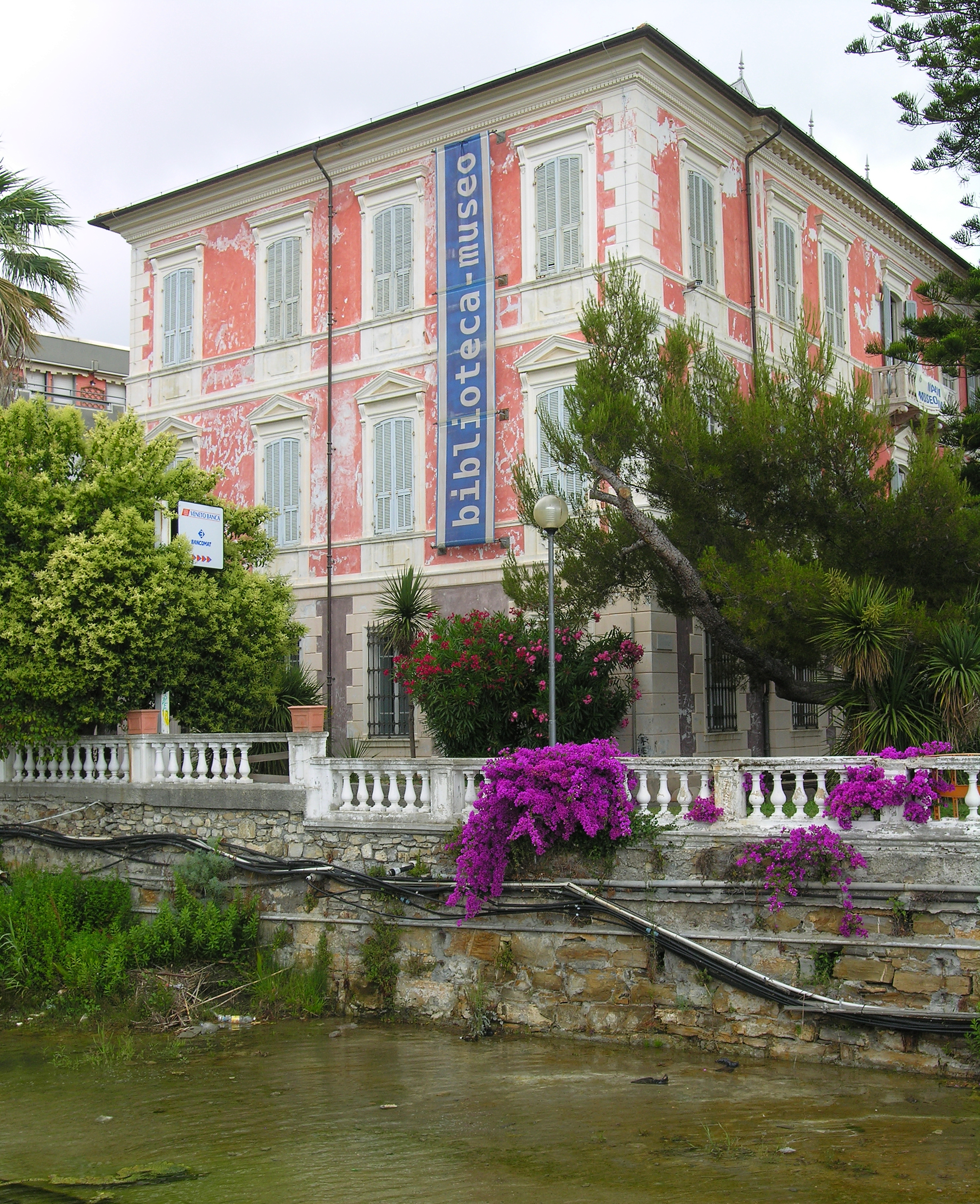
Palazzo del Parco, Diano Marina

=== Events ===
- "Infiorata" flower show, part of the Feast of Corpus Christi, which dates back to 1963 and takes place annually along the historic centre of Diano Marina.
- Diano Carnival, which involves decorated floats and folk groups and dates back to 1969; held annually.

== Economy ==
The main industry in the Diano area are tourism-related activities, especially in the summer. The region attracts tourists from all over Europe due to its mild climate. Agricultural activity is also relevant: in the immediate hinterland of Diano, there are numerous greenhouses cultivating basil, tomatoes, and flowers. The olive-growing sector is also very important, and the region is known for producing Taggiasca olive oil.

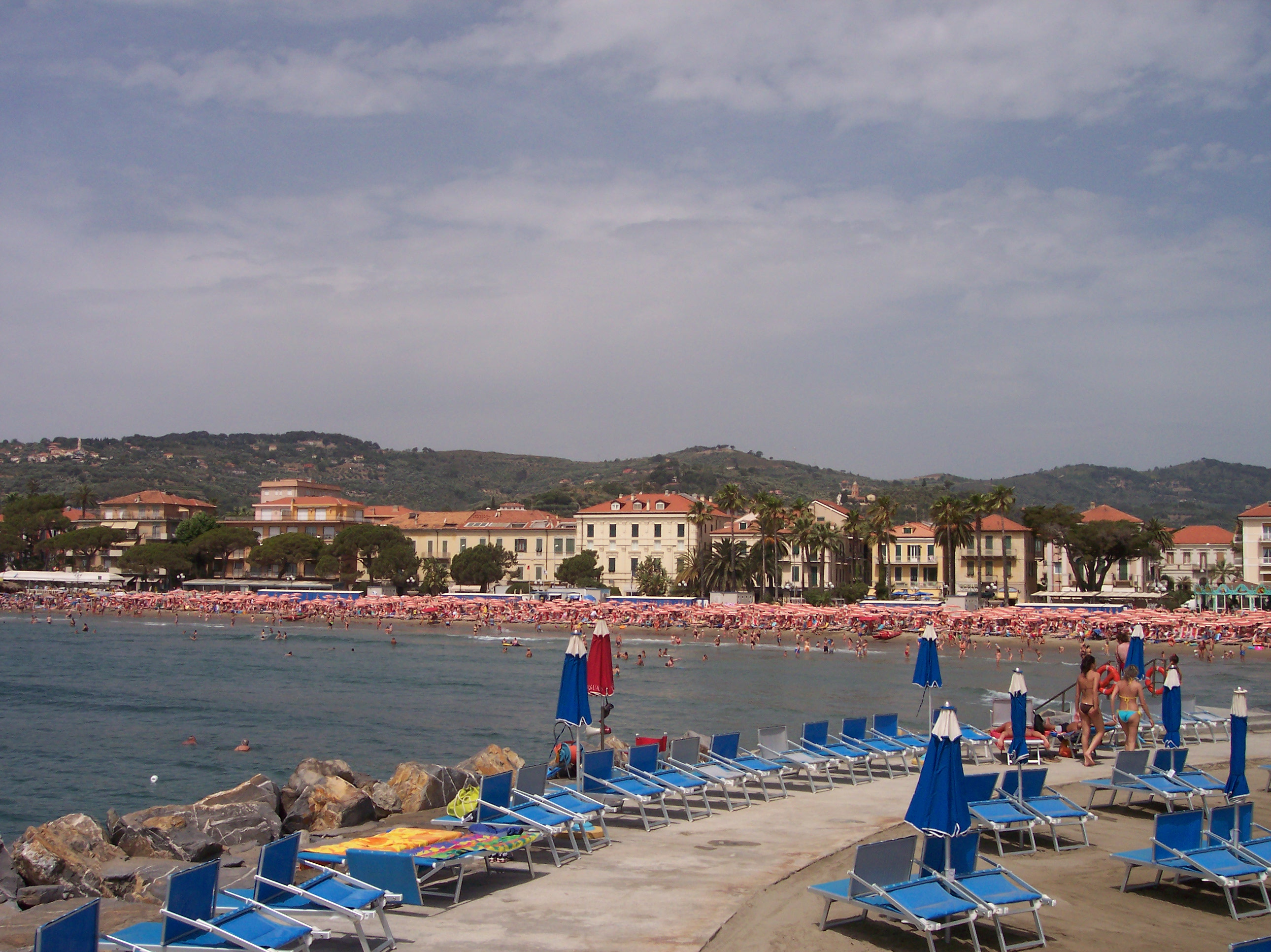
Beach in Diano Marina

== Infrastructure and transport ==
- Diano Marina is serviced by several provincial highways as well as state highway SS1.
- The town has a train station on the Genoa–Ventimiglia railway line, between Ventimiglia and Savona.

== Twin towns ==
Diano Marina is twinned with:

- Diano d'Alba, Italy (2007)
- Granadilla de Abona, Spain (2013)

== Sport ==
=== Cycling ===
- Diano Marina has in the past been on the route of the Giro d'Italia bicycle race, and it is regularly on the route of the Milan–San Remo race, before the famous ascent of Capo Berta.

=== Volleyball ===
- Gulf of Diana Women's Volleyball club, founded in 2005.

=== Football ===
- A.S.D Dianese & Golfo 1923, founded in 2016; participates in the Promozione category.
- ASD Dea Diana football club, founded in 2015; participates in the Terza Categoria.

=== Karate ===
- ASD DKD, founded in 2005; competes nationally and internationally.
