= San Bartolomeo al Mare =

Municipality in Liguria, Italy

- Comune
- Comune di San Bartolomeo al Mare
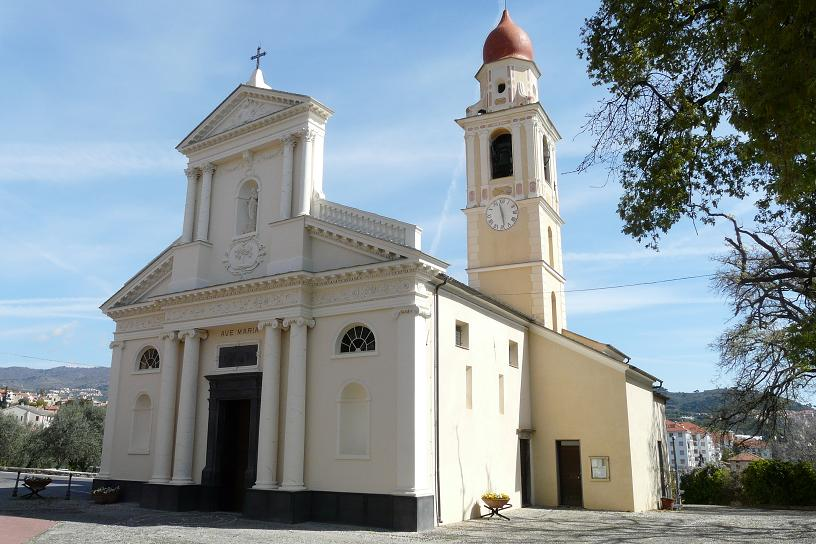
- Church of Our Lady, San Bartolomeo al Mare

- Coat of arms

- Location within Italy Location within Liguria
- Coordinates: 43°55′N 8°6′E
- Country: Italy
- Region: Liguria
- Province: Imperia (IM)

Government
  - Mayor: Valerio Urso

Area
  - Total: 10.85 km^{2} (4.19 sq mi)
- Elevation: 26 m (85 ft)

Population (31 December 2015)
  - Total: 3,129
  - Density: 288.4/km^{2} (746.9/sq mi)
- Demonym: Sanbartolomeesi
- Time zone: UTC+1 (CET)
  - Summer (DST): UTC+2 (CEST)
- Postal code: 18016
- Dialing code: 0183
- Website: Official website

San Bartolomeo al Mare (Ligurian: San Bartumé) is a comune (municipality) in the Province of Imperia in the Italian region Liguria, located about 90 kilometres (56 mi) southwest of Genoa and about 7 kilometres (4 mi) northeast of Imperia.

San Bartolomeo al Mare borders the following municipalities: Andora, Cervo, Diano Castello, Diano Marina, Diano San Pietro, and Villa Faraldi.

== See also ==
- Steria
