= Donno (surname) =

Donno is a surname. Notable people with the surname include:

- Daniela Donno (born 1960), Italian politician
- Edward Donno (1935–2014), American actor and stunt performer
- Eliseo Donno (born 2005), Italian racing driver
- Leonardo Donno (born 1985), Italian politician

== See also ==
- Donno
- Dunn (surname)
- Donato (surname)
- Diano (surname)
