= Merula =

Merula may refer to:

== People ==
- Lucius Cornelius Merula (consul 193 BC), Roman politician and general of the 2nd century BC
- Gnaeus Cornelius Merula, envoy to Cyprus, Crete and Asia Minor in the 2nd century BC
- Lucius Cornelius Merula (consul 87 BC), Roman senator and priest of Jupiter
- Georgius Merula, 15th-century Italian classical scholar
- Paulus Merula, 16th-century Dutch librarian and scholar
- Tarquinio Merula, Italian Baroque composer of the 17th century
- SS Merula, a coastal tanker in service with Ape Azionaria Petroliere from 1949 to 1951

== Zoology ==
- Turdus merula, the common blackbird
- Percnodaimon merula, a butterfly from New Zealand
- Dendrocincla merula, the white-chinned woodcreeper

== Geography ==
- Merula (creek), a tributary of the Ligurian Sea
