= International Chamber Music Festival of Cervo =

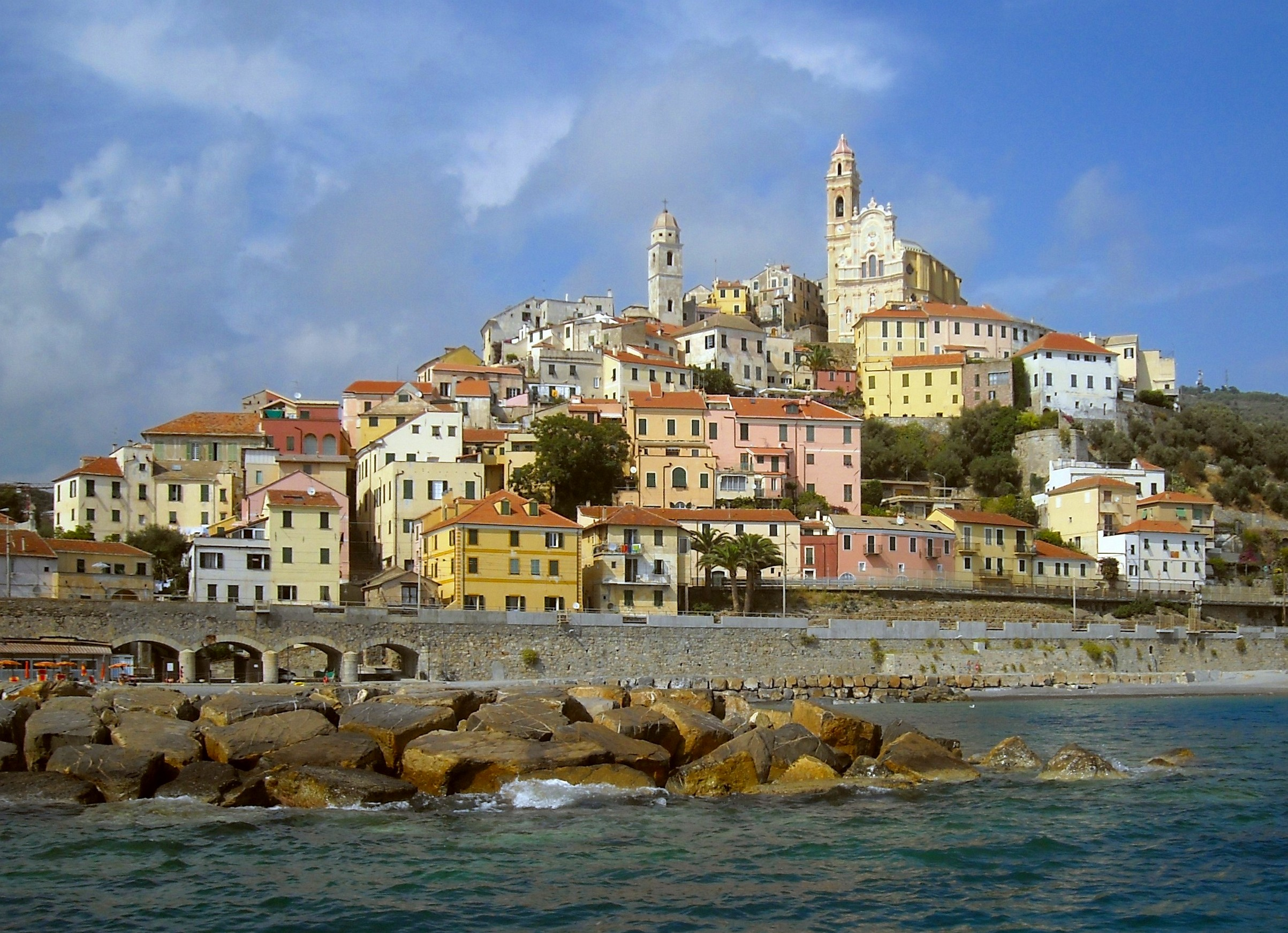
Cervo, location of the festival.

The International Chamber Music Festival of Cervo was inaugurated in 1964, the brainchild of the renowned Hungarian violinist Sandor Vegh. It is held every July and August in the picturesque church square of Cervo, a small, ancient town in Liguria, Italy.

Among the world-class stars who have performed here are Arturo Benedetti Michelangeli, Sviatoslav Richter, Wilhelm Kempff, Maurizio Pollini, Yehudi Menuhin, Elisabeth Schwarzkopf, Martha Argerich, Uto Ughi, Ivo Pogorelić, Andras Schiff, Luciano Berio, François-Joël Thiollier, Paul Badura-Skoda, the King's Singers, Rudolf Buchbinder, Cyprien Katsaris, Joseph Silverstein, Chi-Ho Han, Viktoria Mullova, Ulf Hoelscher, David Geringas, Arnulf von Arnim, Salvatore Accardo, and Fazıl Say.
