= Diano (surname) =

Diano is an Italian toponymic surname. Notable people with the surname include:

- Ferdinando di Diano (16th–17th century), Italian mathematician
- Gaspard de Diano (1389–1451), Italian Roman Catholic prelate
- Giacinto Diano (1731–1803), Italian painter
- Mar Diano (born 1997), Filipino footballer
- Obdulio Diano (1919–2007), Argentine footballer

== See also ==
- Diano (disambiguation)
- Diana (given name)
