= Villa Faraldi =

Villa Faraldi Villa Faródi
- Comune
- Comune di Villa Faraldi
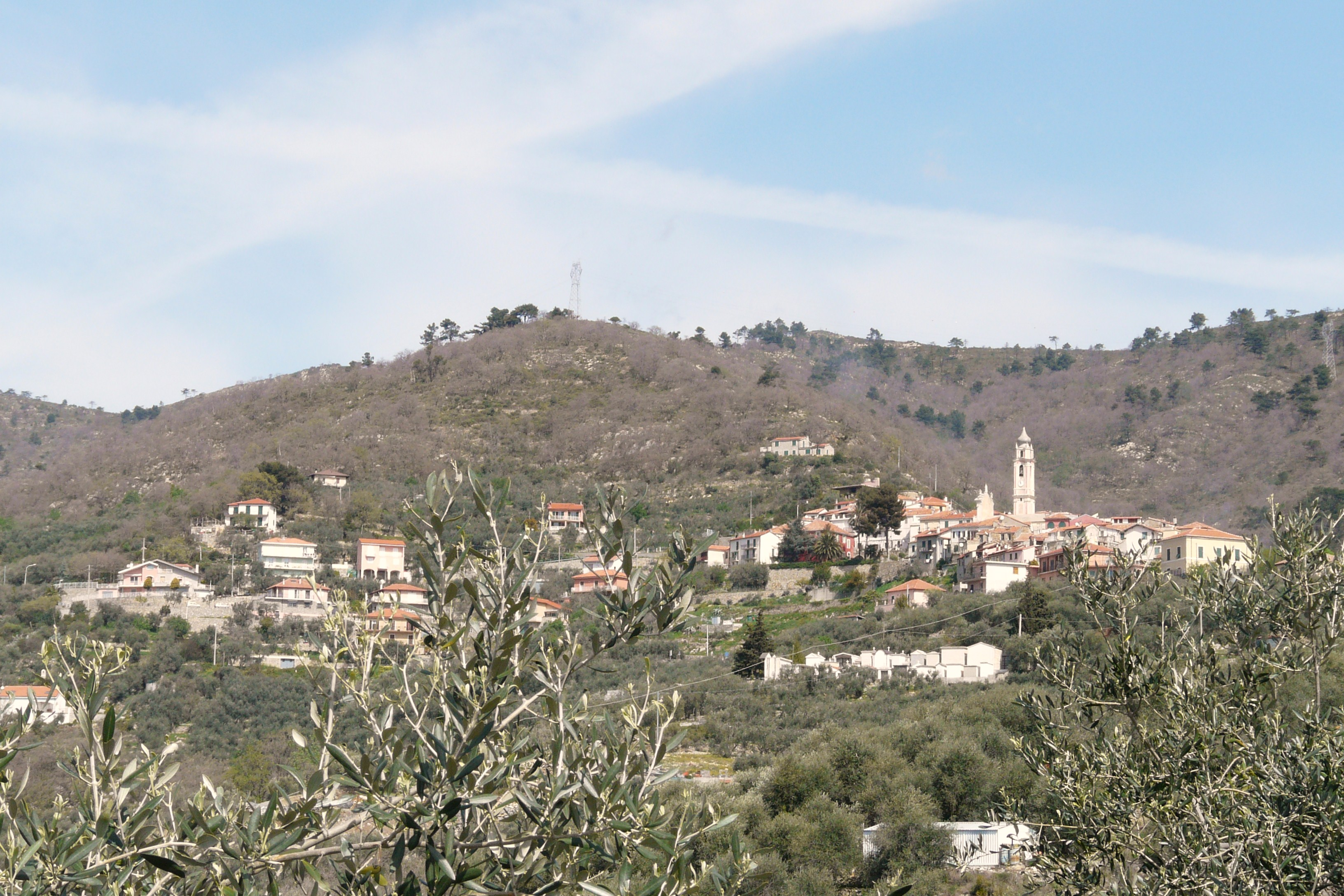
- View of Villa Faraldi

- Location within Italy Location within Liguria
- Coordinates: 43°58′N 8°5′E
- Country: Italy
- Region: Liguria
- Province: Province of Imperia (IM)

Area
  - Total: 9.6 km^{2} (3.7 sq mi)

Population (Dec. 2004)
  - Total: 466
  - Density: 49/km^{2} (130/sq mi)
- Time zone: UTC+1 (CET)
  - Summer (DST): UTC+2 (CEST)
- Postal code: 18010
- Dialing code: 0183

Villa Faraldi (Ligurian: Villa Faródi) is a comune (municipality) in the Province of Imperia in the Italian region Liguria, located about 80 kilometres (50 mi) southwest of Genoa and about 10 kilometres (6 mi) northeast of Imperia. As of 31 December 2004, it had a population of 466 and an area of 9.6 square kilometres (3.7 mi^{2}).

Villa Faraldi borders the following municipalities: Andora, Diano San Pietro, San Bartolomeo al Mare, and Stellanello.

== Demographic evolution ==
Historical population

Year	Pop.	±%
1861	1,149	—
1871	1,151	+0.2%
1881	1,053	−8.5%
1901	1,070	+1.6%
1911	1,052	−1.7%

Year	Pop.	±%
1921	914	−13.1%
1931	723	−20.9%
1936	723	+0.0%
1951	720	−0.4%
1961	576	−20.0%

Year	Pop.	±%
1971	491	−14.8%
1981	431	−12.2%
1991	433	+0.5%
2001	435	+0.5%

Source: Data from ISTAT

== See also ==
- Steria
