= Decauville factory in Val-Saint-Lambert =

Belgian subsidiary of Decauville

Coordinates: 50.611336°N 5.494264°E

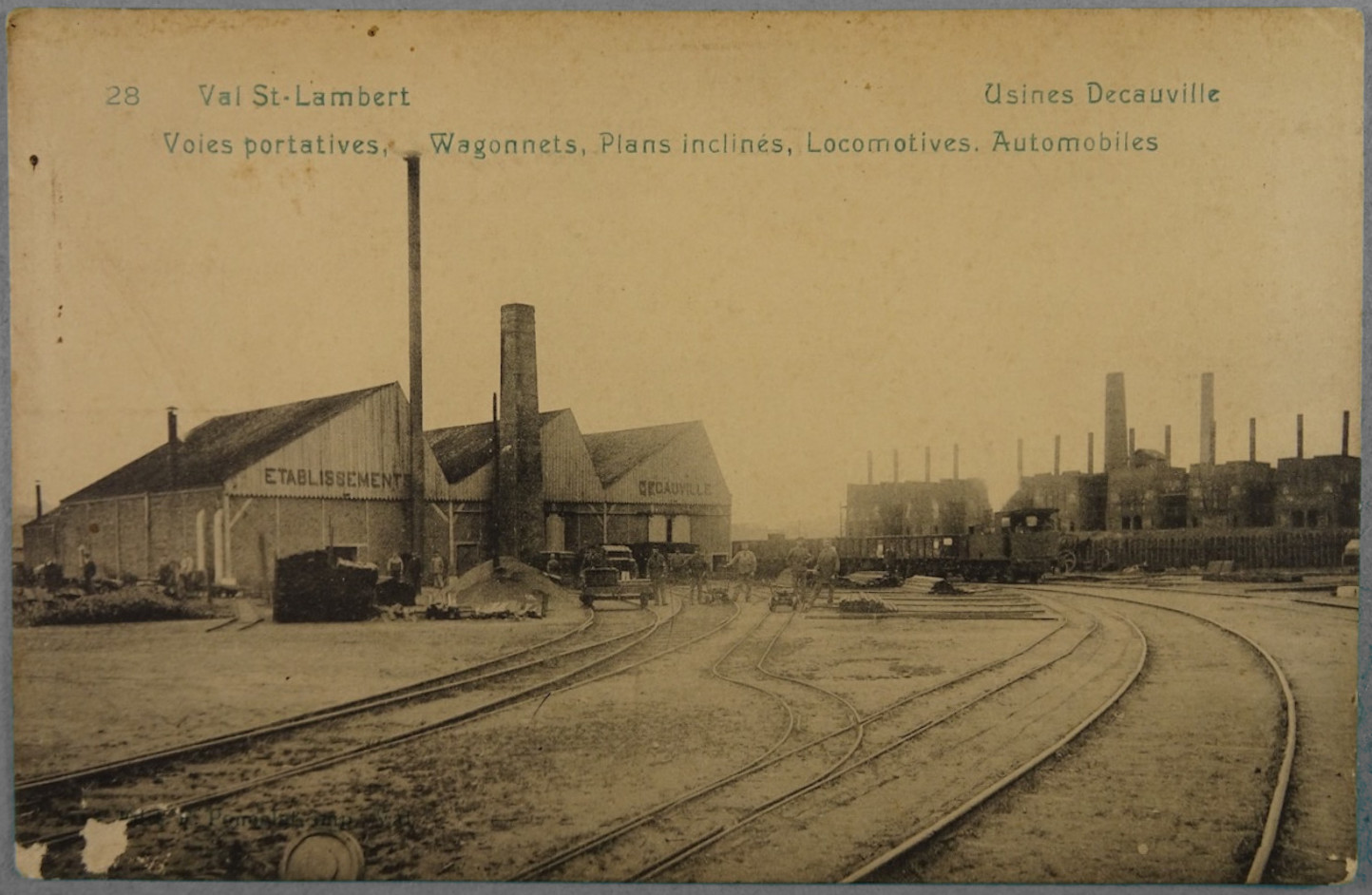
Val-Saint-Lambert – Decauville factories – Portable rail track panels, V skip waggons, inclines (cable railways), locomotives and automobiles

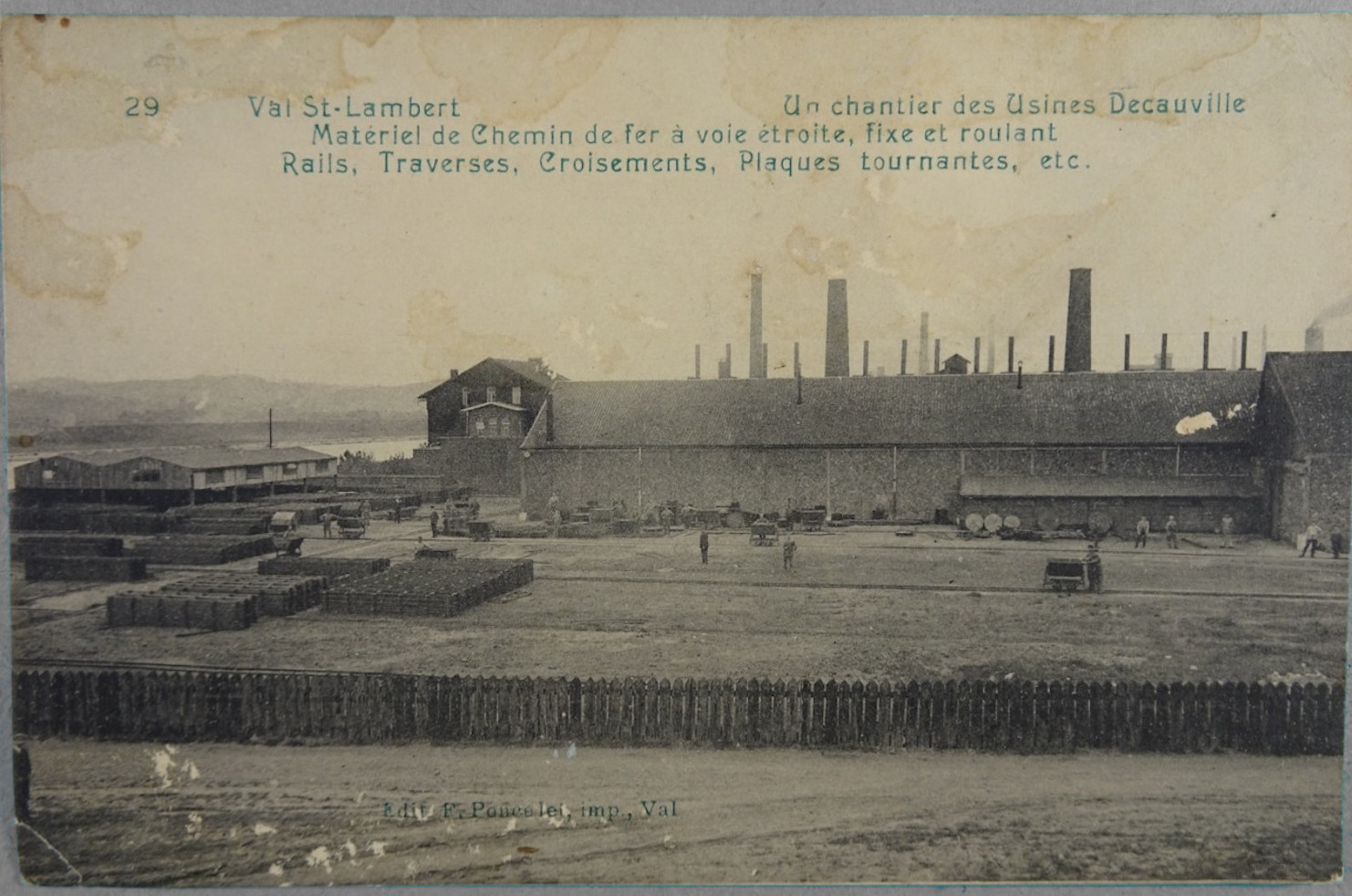
Val-Saint-Lambert - A storage area of the Decauville factory - rails, sleepers, crossings, turntables, etc.

The Decauville factory in Val-Saint-Lambert was a Belgian subsidiary of the French narrow-gauge railway manufacturer Decauville. It was founded in 1895 and taken over by the Berlin-based company O&K from 1911.

== Location ==
The Decauville company had been authorised by the French government to import Belgian iron temporarily duty-free, which allowed it to offer the material intended for export in all French ports at the same price at which it sold the material intended for France at Évry station. However, Belgium, an important potential customer of Decauville rail track panels, was unable to capitalise on this advantage, as the Belgian government demanded a high duty for the re-importation of its iron. Paul Decauville therefore had a first workshop built in Val-Saint-Lambert, Belgium, as early as 1881.^{p. 18}

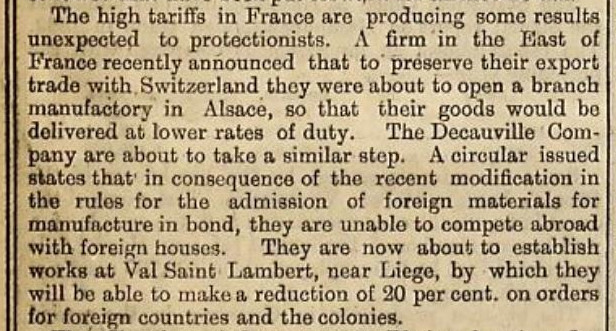
In the summer of 1895, the high tariffs in France had a negative impact on the export business of French companies that the protectionists had not expected. The Decauville company therefore planned to set up a factory abroad in order to be able to deliver its goods to non-French countries at lower duty rates. It published a circular stating that it would no longer be able to compete with foreign companies following the recent change in the rules on the authorisation of foreign materials for the manufacture of bonds abroad. It therefore planned to set up a plant in Val-Saint-Lambert near Liège, which would enable it to grant a 20% discount on orders for foreign countries and the colonies. (Note: The Economist, 30 June 1894, p. 801. "A company in eastern France recently announced^{(June 1894)} that in order to maintain its export trade with Switzerland, it will open a branch factory in Alsace so that its goods can be delivered at lower customs rates..." The Economist, 30 June 1894, p. 801)

== Works ==
The works of the Val-Saint-Lambert factory in the municipality of Seraing near Liège consisted of office and factory buildings, residential buildings, steam engines, boilers, a rail siding and land covering an area of 1.26 hectares (3.1 acres). They were located between the railway from Liège to Namur, a towpath of the Meuse, the Les Petits Fils de François de Wendel and the Rue de Flemalle.

== History ==
In 1911, the French company Société Nouvelle des Établissements Decauville Aîné concluded an agreement with the German company Orenstein & Koppel - Arthur Koppel Aktiengesellschaft (O&K) for a joint venture. At the time, Decauville was the leading light railway dealer in France and its Overseas Territories. The business areas of the two companies therefore complemented each other very well.

The agreement, which was concluded for twenty years, aimed to divide the sales territories. In addition, a reciprocal participation in the business results was agreed, so that O&K was obliged to pay Décauville that percentage of a capital of five million French francs which represented a quarter of the percentage that O&K could distribute as a dividend on its share capital. On the other hand, if Decauville was able to distribute a dividend of more than 12%, it had to pay O&K half of the surplus. If these mutual payments did not equalise, a separate equalisation was to take place within contractually agreed three-year periods. In addition, Decauville was bound to Orenstein & Koppel by comprehensive purchasing obligations, so that O&K secured continuous orders for its factories.

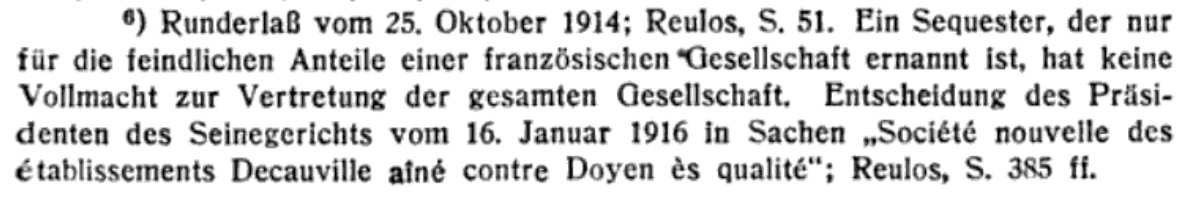
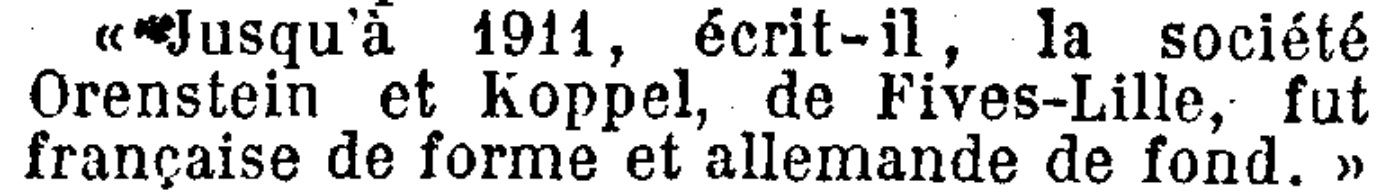
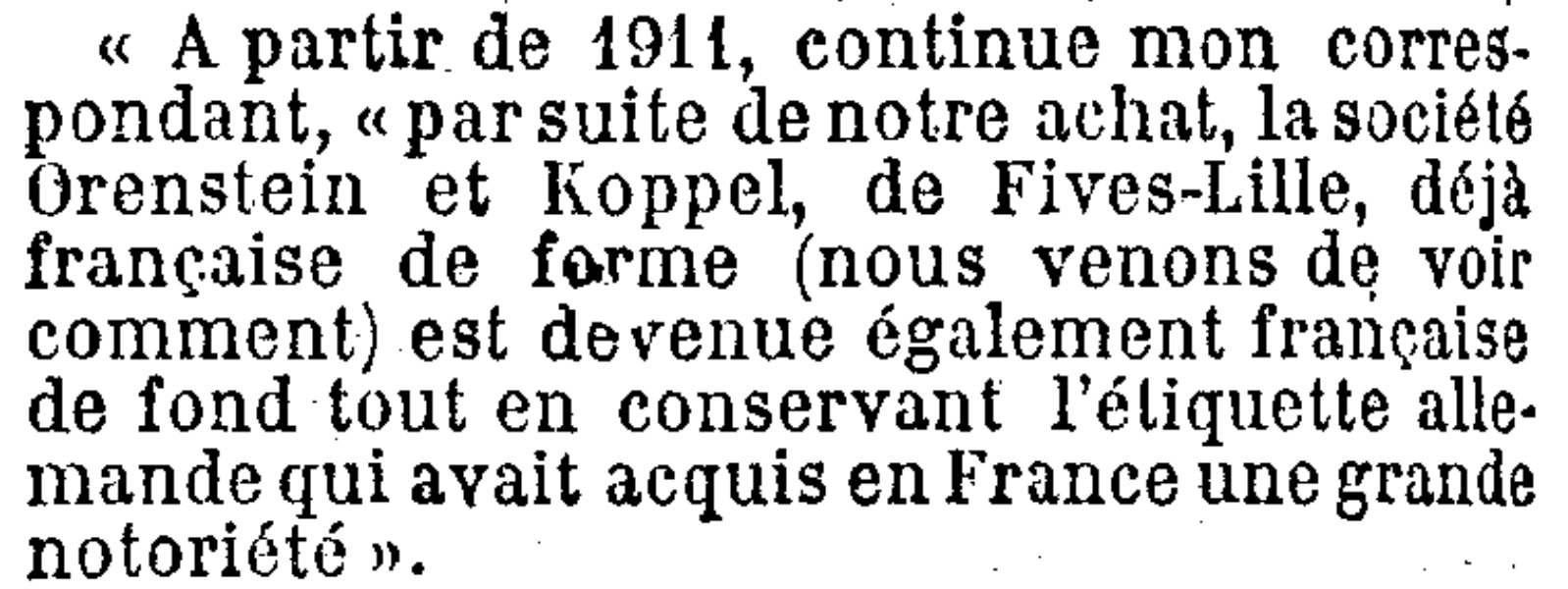
O&K took over the Belgian Décauville plant in Val-Saint-Lambert in 1911 and in return gave Decauville its French plant in Fives. At the same time, an agreement was reached on the sales territories, whereby Decauville took over the French market including the French colonies, O&K the market in the rest of the world. (Note: Circular decree of 25 Oct 1914 with reference to „Société nouvelle des établissements Decauville aîné contre Doyen ès qualité“ After the First World War, disputed French sites of the Decauville company were placed under the control of a trustee in sequestration, which had to decide whether they were managed by French or German directors and investors. A company was considered hostile not only if it was located on hostile territory, but also if its management or capital was directly or indirectly under the control or dependence of a hostile state or persons. In the case of the Decauville company, the trustee, who had only been appointed for the hostile shares of the French company (in Fives-Lille), was not authorised to represent the company as a whole.) (Note: "Until 1911 ... the O&K company from Fives-Lille was French in form and German in essence." „Until 1911 ... the O&K company from Fives-Lille was French in form and German in essence.“ It was managed by two German directors: Mr Franken was the technical director and Mr Neisser was the commercial director. As far as the Fives-Lille factory was concerned, on the eve of the declaration of war, in July 1914, just under twenty of the thirty employees there were German nationals.) (Note: "From 1911 ... the company O&K from Fives-Lille, which was already French in form ... also became French in essence" "From 1911 ... the company O&K from Fives-Lille, which was already French in form ... also became French in essence through our purchase (i.e. after the purchase by Decauville), while retaining the German label, which had become very well known in France.")

The Belgian Decauville factory, which had been set up in Val-Saint-Lambert for export, was particularly well positioned for the production of riveted tracks, which Decauville had mastered very well, so that it could often easily prevail over the German track material on the export markets. Decauville was completely superior to O&K in this sector, as O&K often realised. O&K therefore wanted to continue the production of riveted tracks in Val-Saint-Lambert and at the same time convert this factory for the construction of wagons in large quantities, as Belgium was very capable in wagon construction, mainly due to the favourable prices of sheet metal and the much lower labour costs compared to France.

The factory in Val-Saint-Lambert built mainly wagons and carriages for ordinary field and narrow-gauge railways and for mining. The agreement reached on co-operation between the two companies also provided for each of them to have a stake in the other. Thus Hippolyte-Eugène Boyer, the managing director of Decauville, joined the board of directors of O&K, while one of the directors of O&K was a member of the board of directors of Decauville.

After the outbreak of the World War I in 1914, O&K used the facilities left behind by Decauville under the aegis of the occupying army, in particular for the production of military light railways.

== Sales ==
Decauville allowed O&K to set up new branches at any time under the name of Decauville, which was known and well-established worldwide in the field of narrow gauge railways. In many countries around the world, the term Decauville railway was used colloquially and even in legal texts as a synonym for all small and narrow gauge railways with a gauge of 600 mm (1 ft 11 5/8 in). Decauville took over under his name all the branches that had been founded by O&K in France.

Decauville undertook to order from O&K all locomotives, excavators and self-unloaders, i.e. all products that it could not produce itself in its own factories. O&K foresaw that this agreement would bring it very large orders, because in the 18 months before the contract was concluded, Decauville had ordered about 175 locomotives from Borsig and excavators worth one million (franc^{?}) from [[Orenstein & Koppel#Werk Lübeck|Lübecker Maschinenbau Gesellschaft AG in Lübeck (which was also taken-over by O&K on 17 June 1911)]].

The entire export business outside France and its colonies was to be reserved entirely for O&K. O&K took over all Decauville branches and agencies abroad and had the right to dissolve or maintain them. O&K was also authorised to set up new branches under the Decauville name at any time if O&K so wished.
