= Ferdinando di Diano =

Italian mathematician (16th–17th century)

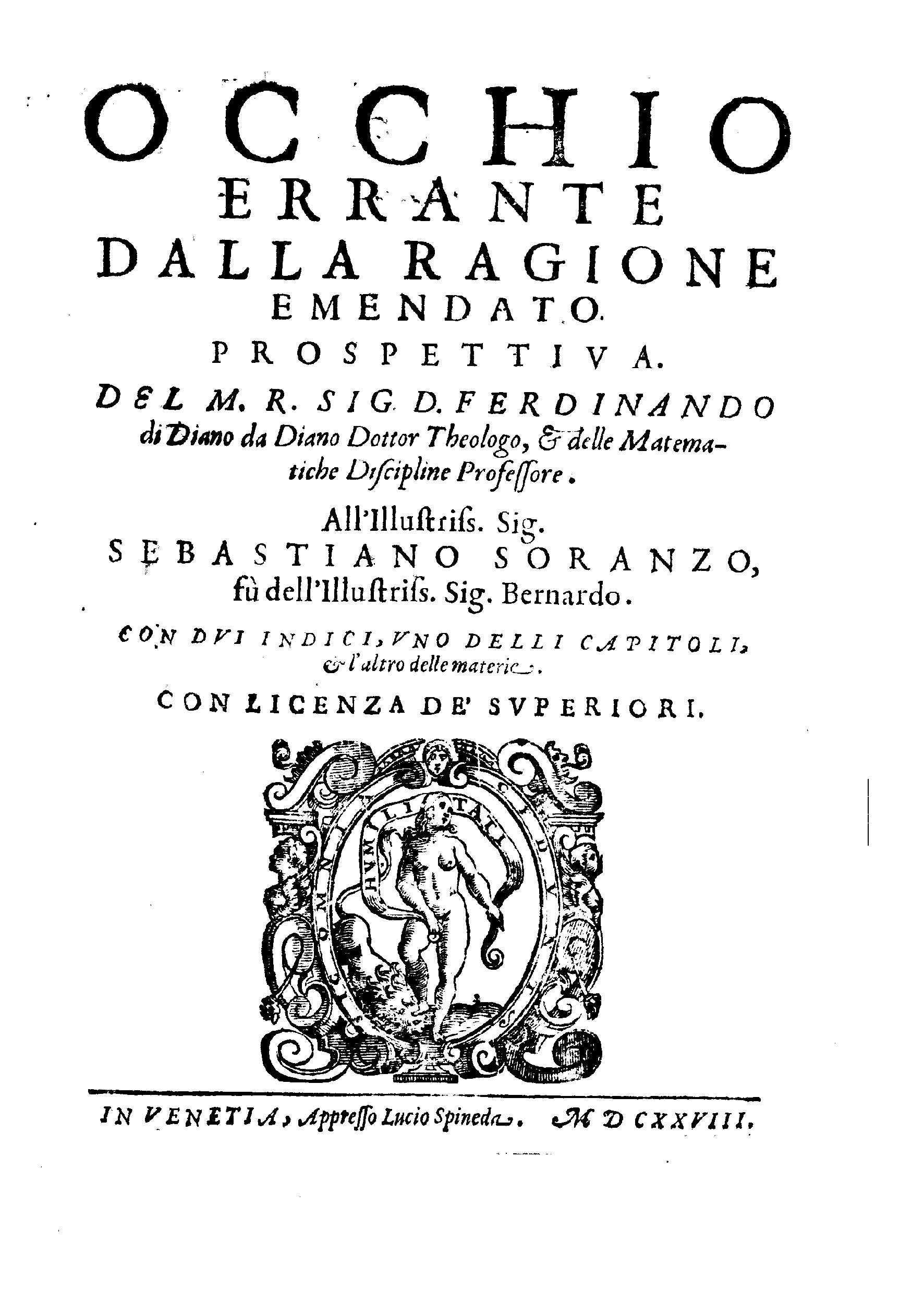
Occhio errante dalla ragione emendato, 1628

Ferdinando di Diano da Diano (about 1571 - 17th century), also known as Donatus Polienus, was an Italian mathematician, abbot, philosopher, and theologist.

He wrote at least 15 works about different topics, from religious history to natural science.

== Life ==
Born in Siderno, Calabria, Di Diano was active as philosopher in Liguria around 1630.

== Works ==
- Diano, Ferdinando di (1628). Occhio errante dalla ragione emendato. In Venetia: Lucio Spineda.
- Fiume dell'origine della lingua italiana et latina (1626)
