= Diano Arentino =

Diano Arentino Dian Arentin
- Comune
- Comune di Diano Arentino
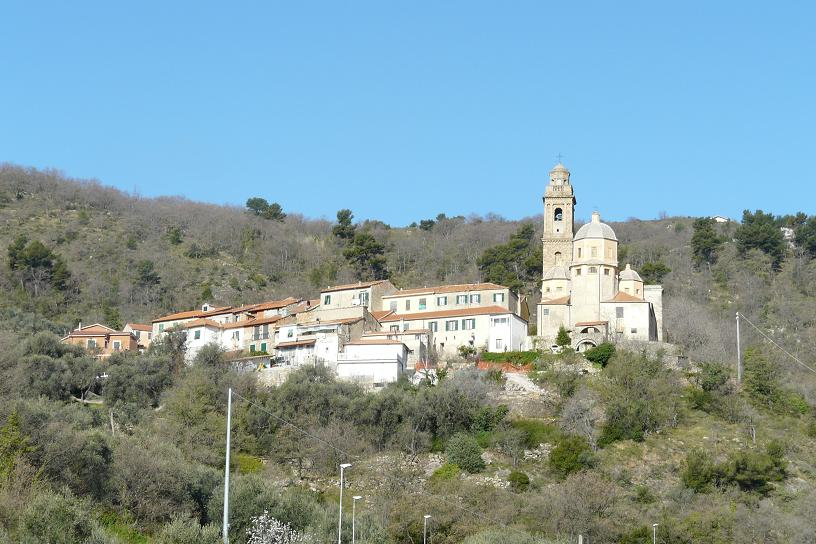
- View of Diano Arentino

- Coat of arms

- Location within Italy Location within Liguria
- Coordinates: 43°57′N 8°2′E
- Country: Italy
- Region: Liguria
- Province: Province of Imperia (IM)

Government
  - Mayor: Paolo Sciandino

Area
  - Total: 8.3 km^{2} (3.2 sq mi)

Population (Dec. 2004)
  - Total: 648
  - Density: 78/km^{2} (200/sq mi)
- Time zone: UTC+1 (CET)
  - Summer (DST): UTC+2 (CEST)
- Postal code: 18013
- Dialing code: 0183

Diano Arentino (Ligurian: Dian Arentin) is a comune (municipality) in the Province of Imperia in the Italian region Liguria, located about 90 kilometres (56 mi) southwest of Genoa and about 7 kilometres (4 mi) north of Imperia. As of 31 December 2004, it had a population of 648 and an area of 8.3 square kilometres (3.2 mi^{2}).

Diano Arentino borders the following municipalities: Chiusanico, Diano Castello, Diano San Pietro, Imperia, Pontedassio, and Stellanello.

== Demographic evolution ==
Historical population

Year	Pop.	±%
1861	861	—
1871	873	+1.4%
1881	839	−3.9%
1901	752	−10.4%
1911	791	+5.2%

Year	Pop.	±%
1921	705	−10.9%
1931	574	−18.6%
1936	549	−4.4%
1951	519	−5.5%
1961	468	−9.8%

Year	Pop.	±%
1971	402	−14.1%
1981	400	−0.5%
1991	518	+29.5%
2001	606	+17.0%

Source: Data from ISTAT

== See also ==
- San Pietro (creek)
