= Diano San Pietro =

Municipality in Liguria, Italy

Diano San Pietro Dian San Pê
- Comune
- Comune di Diano San Pietro
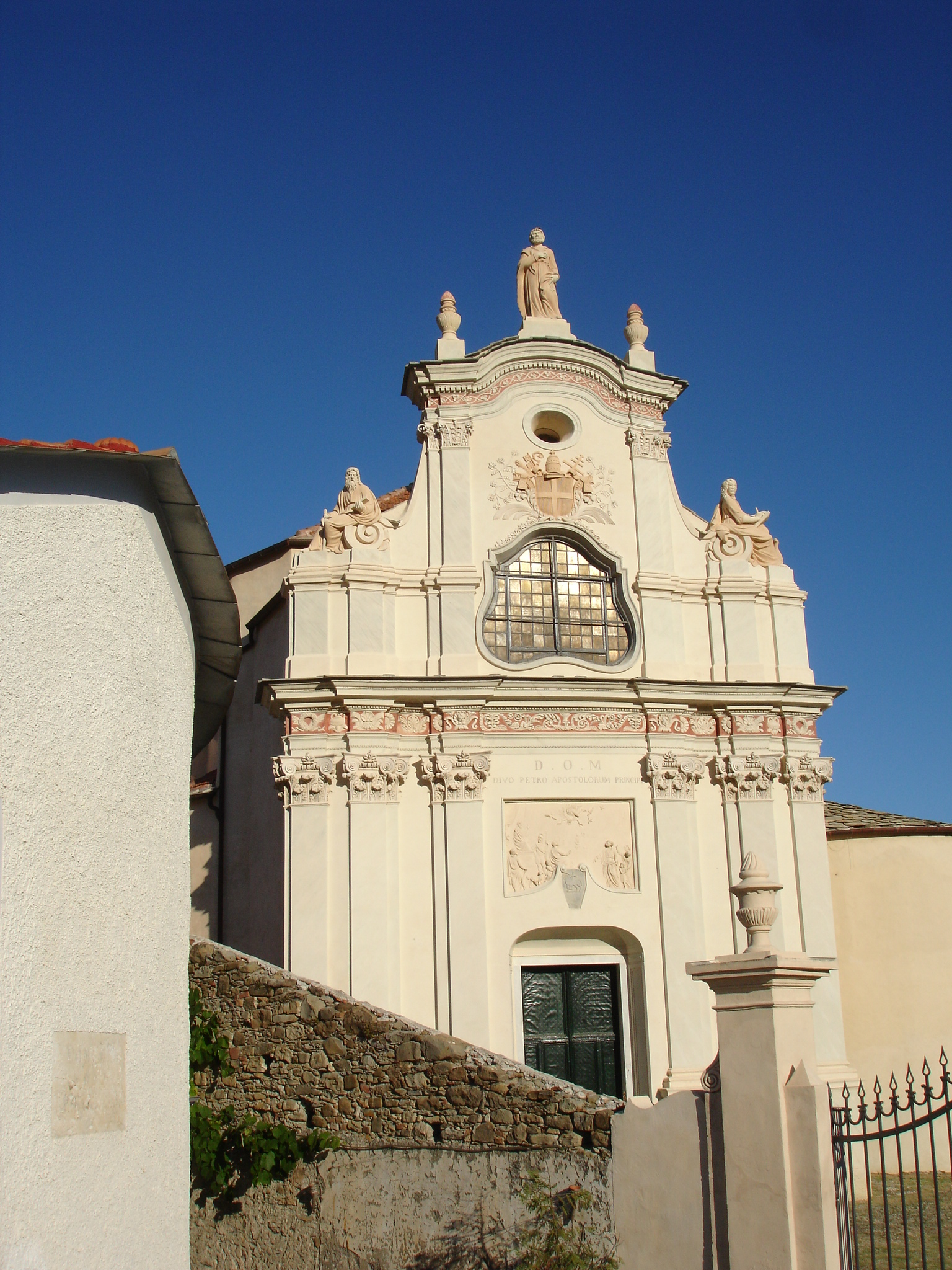
- Church of Saint Peter, Diano San Pietro

- Coat of arms

- Location within Italy Location within Liguria
- Coordinates: 43°56′N 8°4′E
- Country: Italy
- Region: Liguria
- Province: Imperia (IM)

Government
  - Mayor: Claudio Mucilli

Area
  - Total: 11.8 km^{2} (4.6 sq mi)
- Elevation: 83 m (272 ft)

Population (31 December 2011)
  - Total: 1,115
  - Density: 94.5/km^{2} (245/sq mi)
- Time zone: UTC+1 (CET)
  - Summer (DST): UTC+2 (CEST)
- Postal code: 18010
- Dialing code: 0183
- Patron saint: St. Peter
- Saint day: 29 June

Diano San Pietro (Ligurian: Dian San Pê) is a comune (municipality) in the Province of Imperia in the Italian region Liguria, located about 90 kilometres (56 mi) southwest of Genoa and about 6 kilometres (4 mi) northeast of Imperia.

Diano San Pietro borders the following municipalities: Diano Arentino, Diano Castello, San Bartolomeo al Mare, Stellanello, and Villa Faraldi.

Diano San Pietro is the setting for the books by the English writer Annie Hawes, Extra Virgin and Ripe for the Picking.

== See also ==
- San Pietro (creek)
