= Diano Castello =

Municipality in Liguria, Italy

Diano Castello Dian Castello
- Comune
- Comune di Diano Castello
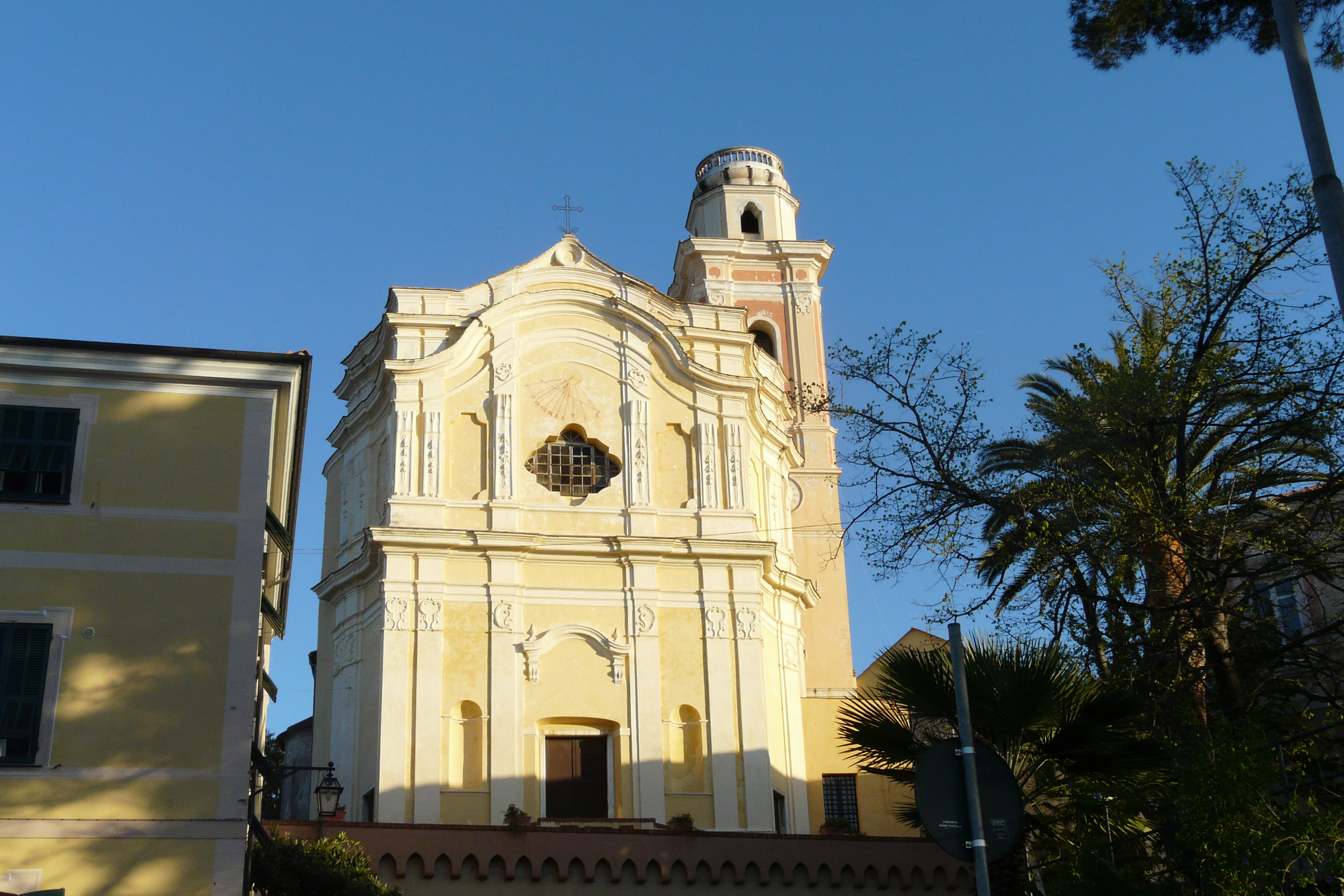
- Church of Nicholas of Bari, Diano Castello

- Coat of arms

- Location within Italy Location within Liguria
- Coordinates: 43°55′N 8°4′E
- Country: Italy
- Region: Liguria
- Province: Province of Imperia (IM)

Area
  - Total: 6.0 km^{2} (2.3 sq mi)

Population (Dec. 2004)
  - Total: 2,061
  - Density: 340/km^{2} (890/sq mi)
- Time zone: UTC+1 (CET)
  - Summer (DST): UTC+2 (CEST)
- Postal code: 18010
- Dialing code: 0183

Diano Castello (Ligurian: Dian Castello) is a comune (municipality) in the Province of Imperia in the Italian region Liguria, located about 90 kilometres (56 mi) southwest of Genoa and about 5 kilometres (3 mi) northeast of Imperia. As of 31 December 2004, it had a population of 2,061 and an area of 6.0 square kilometres (2.3 mi^{2}).

Diano Castello borders the following municipalities: Diano Arentino, Diano Marina, Diano San Pietro, Imperia, and San Bartolomeo al Mare. The hills surrounding the village are covered with olive groves and with vineyards that produce Vermentino, a white wine. It is one of I Borghi più belli d'Italia ("The most beautiful villages of Italy").

== History ==
As the name of the municipality suggests, it was originally built in the 10th century as a fortification (Castrum Diani) against incursions by the Saracen pirates. As with many villages around Savona, it later became a fief of the Clavesana marquisate, who built a fortress and ruled till the second half of the 12th century. In the 14th century, Diano Castello became a free municipality (Communitas Diani), that controlled the surrounding villages. It later became part of the Republic of Genoa. The people of this village fought along with Genoa against Pisa in the Battle of Meloria (1284). In 1747 it became part of the Austro-Hungarian Empire. In 1797 it came under French rule when it was conquered by Napoleon Bonaparte. In 1815 it was assigned to the Kingdom of Sardinia. Finally, in 1860 it became part of the Kingdom of Italy. The earthquake of 1887 inflicted serious damage to the churches and the historical monuments

== Churches and monuments ==
- Church of San Nicola di Bari : The original medieval church dates from before the 12th century. It became the parish church in 1223. The present building is the work of Giobatta and Giacomo Filippo Marvaldi, who rebuilt it in Baroque style between 1699 and 1725. The interior is decorated with polychrome marble ornamentation. The main altar is embellished with marble intarsia. The wooden choir in the apse dates from the 18th century. The wooden crucifix above the altar is ascribed to Anton Maria Maragliano.
- Church of St. John the Baptist (Chiesa di San Giovanni Battista) is situated at the northern side of the village. It was built in Romanesque style around 1,000 A.D. It was modified in the 12th century when the three-naved structure was replaced by a single nave. The finely painted wooden roofing truss dates from the 15th century, but was heavily restored in the 19th century. The paintings depict saints, the cycle of the months and people labouring in the fields.
- Church of Santa Maria Assunta : this Romanesque church retains the apse that was built in the 13th century. Its arches rest on anthropomorphic corbels. There are several frescoes in Baroque and Renaissance style. Recent restorations revealed 14th-century frescoes by Antonio Monregalese.
- Church of Santa Maria degli Angeli
- Oratory of San Bernardino and the Holy Cross : dating from the late Middle Ages and was largely restored in the 17th century.
- Franciscan convent : dates from the 16th century. The altarpiece is an oil on canvas depicting St. Peter of Alcantara, by Giovanni Battista Carlone.
- The city hall (Palazzo comunale) was built in the 15th century as the residence of the Counts Quaglia. It contains a large fresco on the façade of the building representing the Genoese victory at the Battle of Meloria.
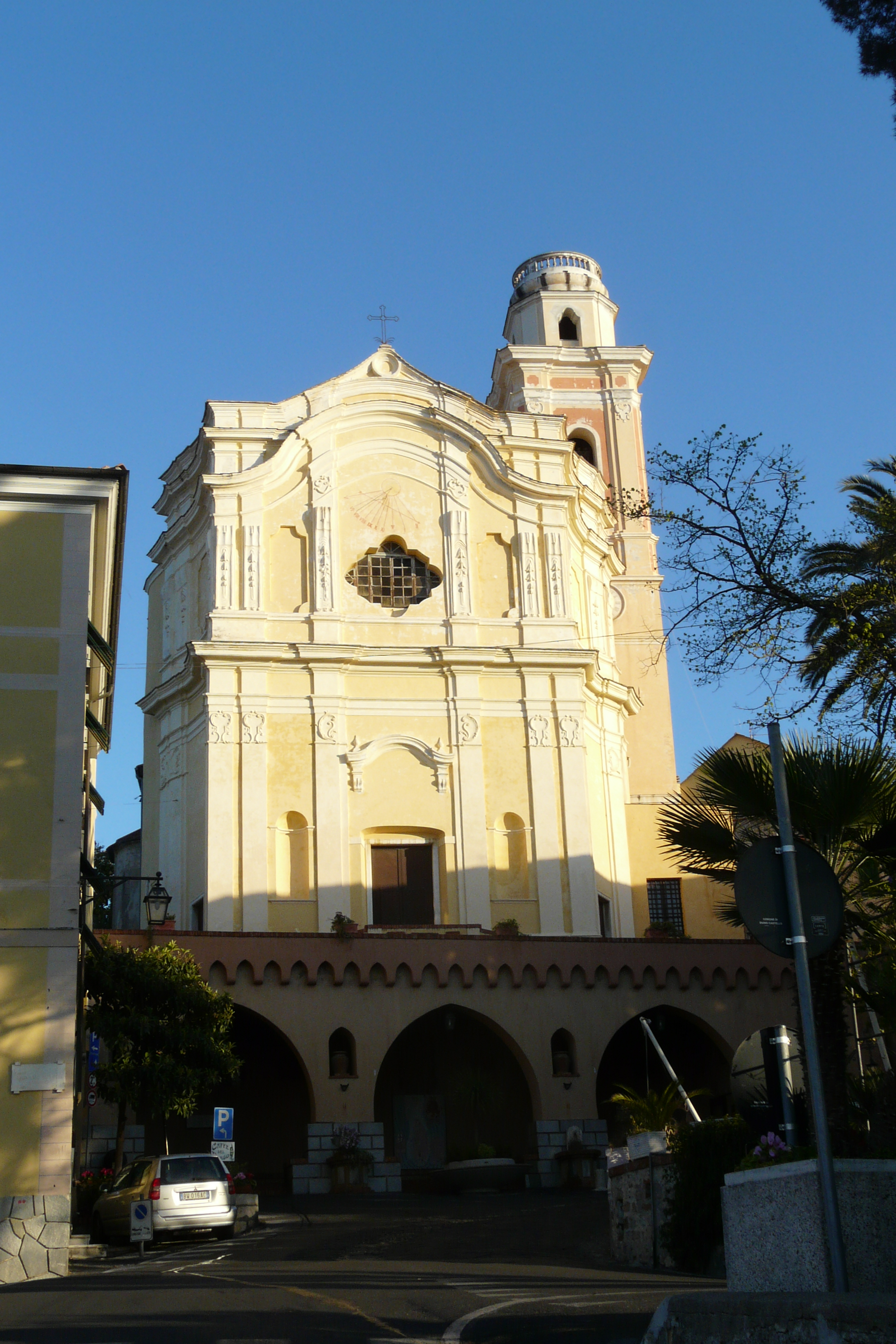
Church of San Nicolò di Bari

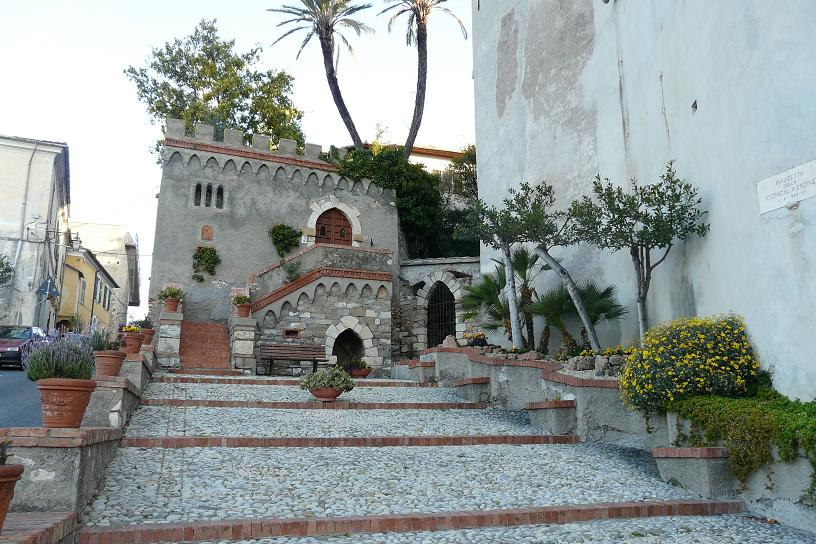

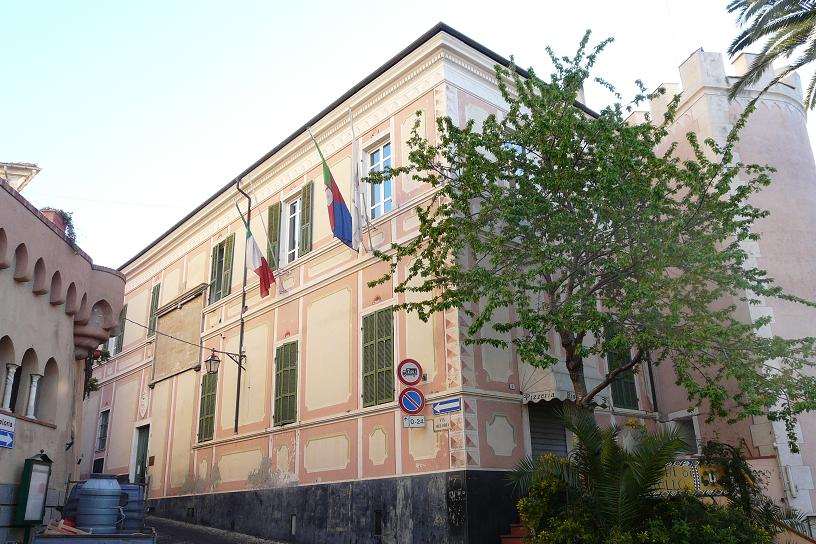

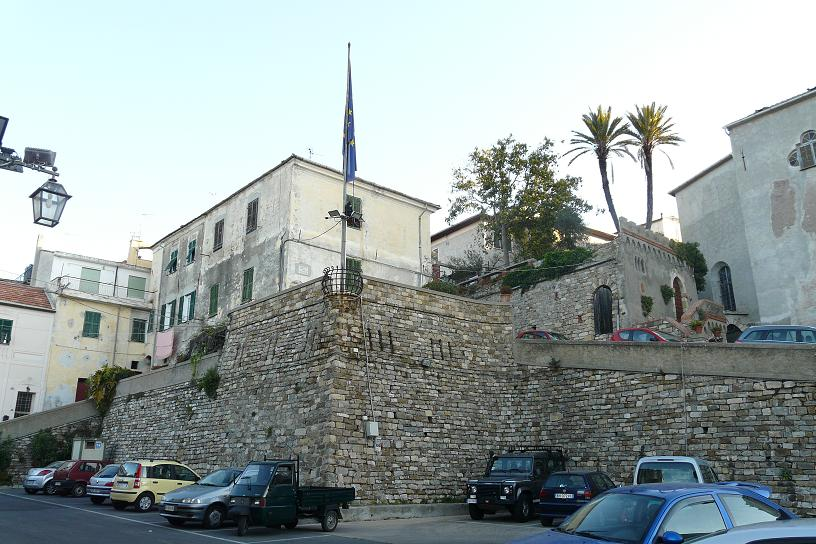

== Demographic evolution ==
Historical population

Year	Pop.	±%
1861	999	—
1871	975	−2.4%
1881	902	−7.5%
1901	999	+10.8%
1911	1,087	+8.8%

Year	Pop.	±%
1921	975	−10.3%
1931	941	−3.5%
1936	973	+3.4%
1951	920	−5.4%
1961	1,097	+19.2%

Year	Pop.	±%
1971	1,201	+9.5%
1981	1,204	+0.2%
1991	1,506	+25.1%
2001	1,885	+25.2%

Source: Data from ISTAT

== See also ==
- Liguria wine
