= Merula (creek) =

Stream in Liguria, Italy

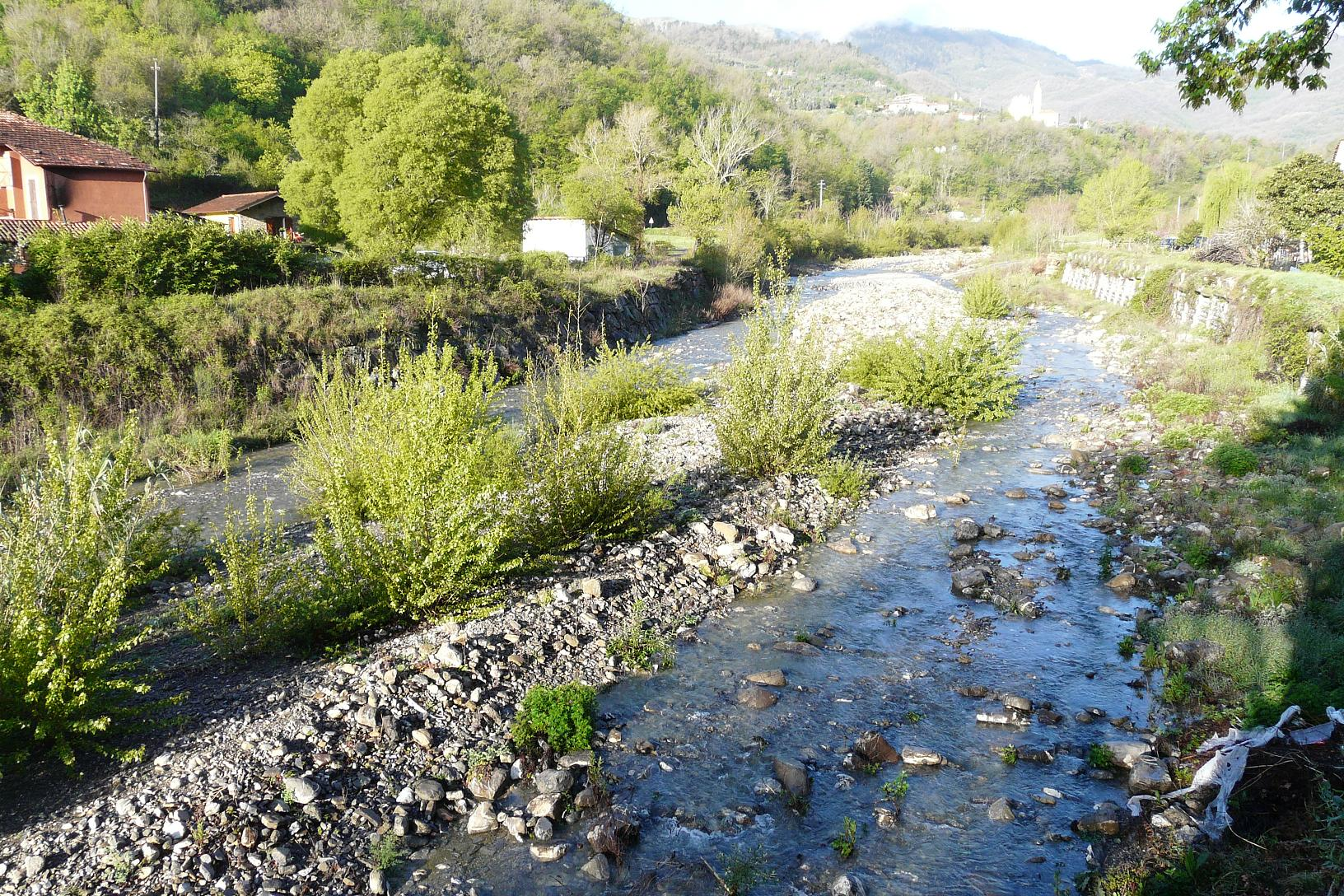
- Merula creek in Stellanello

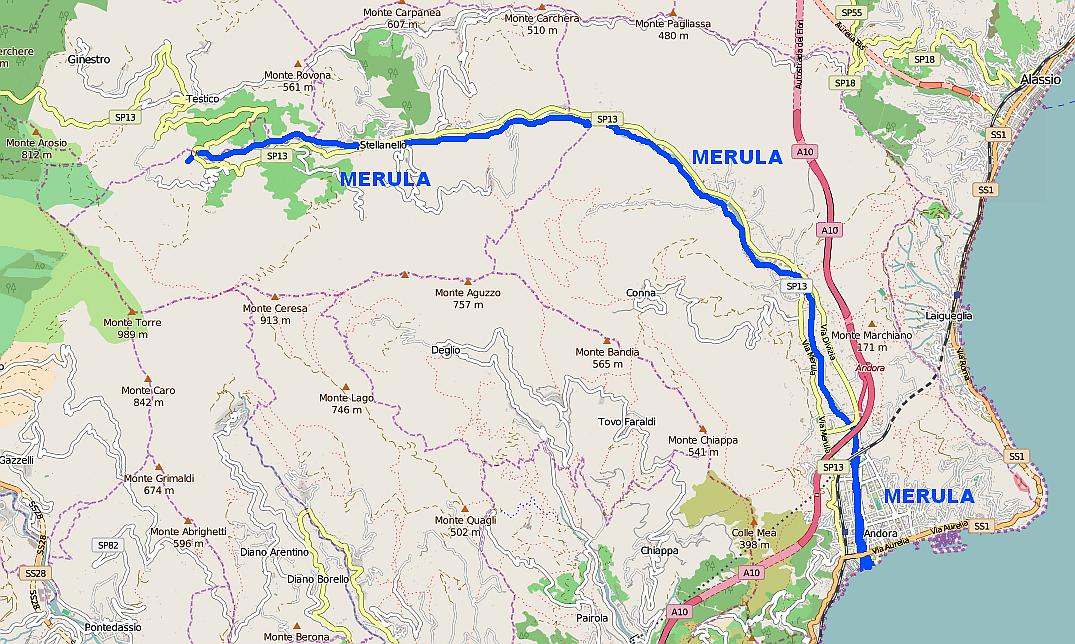

Location
- Country: Italy

Physical characteristics
- Source
  - location: Eastern slopes of Monte Torre (Ligurian Alps)
- Mouth: Ligurian Sea
  - location: Andora (SV)
  - coordinates: 43.9482°N 8.1437°E
  - elevation: 0 m (0 ft)
- Length: 14.7 km (9.1 mi)
- Basin size: 49 km^{2} (19 sq mi)

The Merula is a 14.7-kilometre (9.1 mi) stream of Liguria (Italy).

== Geography ==
The creek is formed not far from the centre of Testico from the union of several streams descending the eastern slopes of Monte Torre (990 m). At first it flows down heading East and then turns South towards the Ligurian Sea. Close to its mouth, which is located in Marina di Anrora, the Marula is crossed by Autostrada dei Fiori, Genoa–Ventimiglia railway and State highway nr.1 (Via Aurelia).

The Merula basin (49 km2) is wholly included in the Province of Savona.

=== Main tributaries ===
- Right hand:
  - rio Moltedo
  - rio Domo;
- left hand:
  - rio Tigorella,
  - rio Metta.

== Nature conservation ==
On the mouth of the Merula was established a nature protected area of 2.6 ha managed by the comune of Andora and called Oasi del Merula. Even if small this nature reserve is important because is one of the few wetlands available for water birds next to the Ligurian sea shore.

== See also ==
- List of rivers of Italy

Media related to Merula at Wikimedia Commons
