= Cervo, Liguria =

Cervo O Çervo
- Comune
- Comune di Cervo
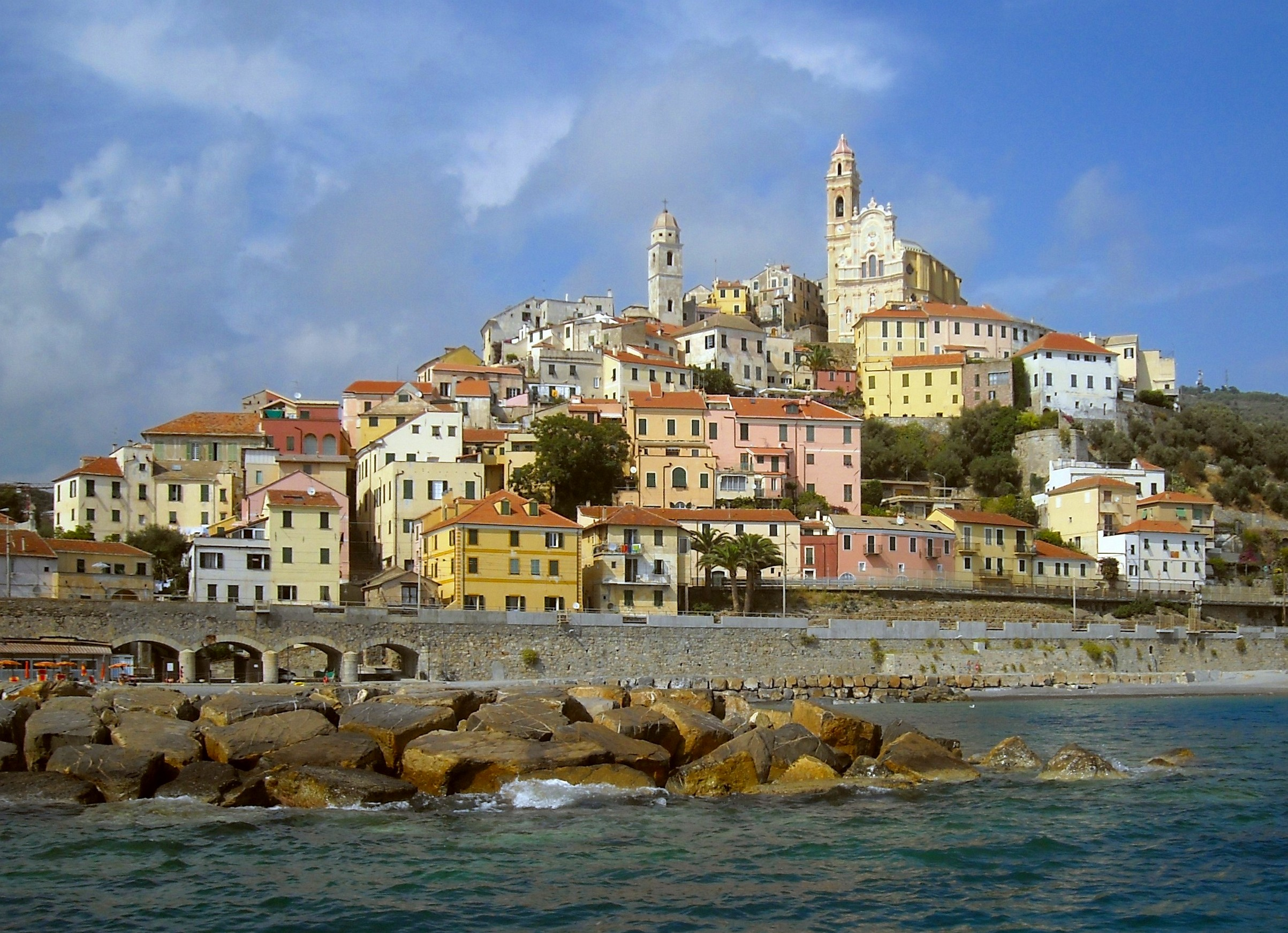
- The village of Cervo

- Coat of arms

- Location within Italy Location within Liguria
- Coordinates: 43°55′N 8°07′E
- Country: Italy
- Region: Liguria
- Province: Province of Imperia (IM)

Area
  - Total: 3.39 km^{2} (1.31 sq mi)
- Elevation: 66 m (217 ft)

Population (31 May 2007)
  - Total: 1,157
  - Density: 341/km^{2} (884/sq mi)
- Demonym: Cervesi
- Time zone: UTC+1 (CET)
  - Summer (DST): UTC+2 (CEST)
- Postal code: 18010
- Dialing code: 0183
- Patron saint: Saint John the Baptist
- Saint day: 24 June
- Website: Official website

Cervo (Ligurian: O Çervo) is a small, ancient town and comune, built on top of a hill along the Italian Riviera in the province of Imperia. It has approximately 1,200 inhabitants. It is one of I Borghi più belli d'Italia ("The most beautiful villages of Italy").

== Overview ==
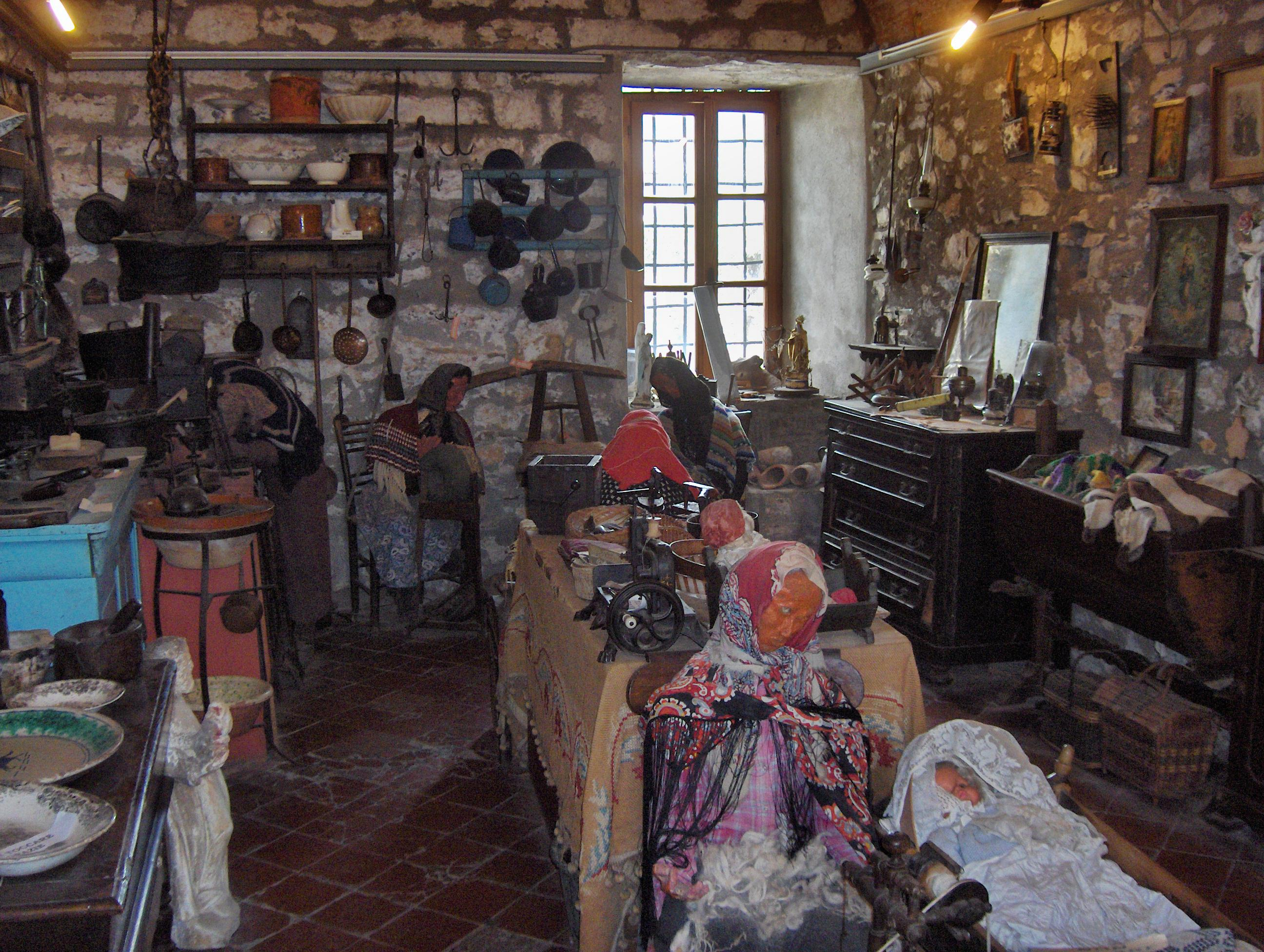
Inside the Ethnographic Museum of Western Liguria

The settlement began as a Roman mansion along the Via Julia Augusta. Slowly expanding, it became, in medieval times, a fief of the Clavesana marquis, who was a subject of the Republic of Genoa, to which Cervo had always been faithful. The present character of Cervo dates from these times: 16th-century towers and ramparts still protect the village.

One of its main attractions is the fine baroque church of St. John the Baptist, overlooking the sea. The Romanesque Oratorio di Santa Caterina contain 18th-century frescoes. The medieval Clavesana stronghold hosts the Ethnographic Museum of Western Liguria and the Palazzo Viale-Citati.

Inhabitants used to earn a living from coral fishing in the Corsican and Sardinian seas, in addition to growing olives and seafaring, but the modern economy of Cervo is based on tourism and agriculture.

Cervo's connections with classical music date from to 1964, when the International Chamber Music Festival of Cervo was established by the Hungarian violinist Sandor Vegh. The event has been held every summer ever since. Music master classes – Accademia di Cervo – are held in September, and a guitar academy is held in June.

== Twin towns/sister cities ==
Cervo is twinned with:

- Cervo, Lugo, Spain (2008)

== In popular culture ==
Part of the 1993 German film Stalingrad was filmed in Cervo.

== See also ==
- Steria
