= Stellanello =

- Comune
- Comune di Stellanello
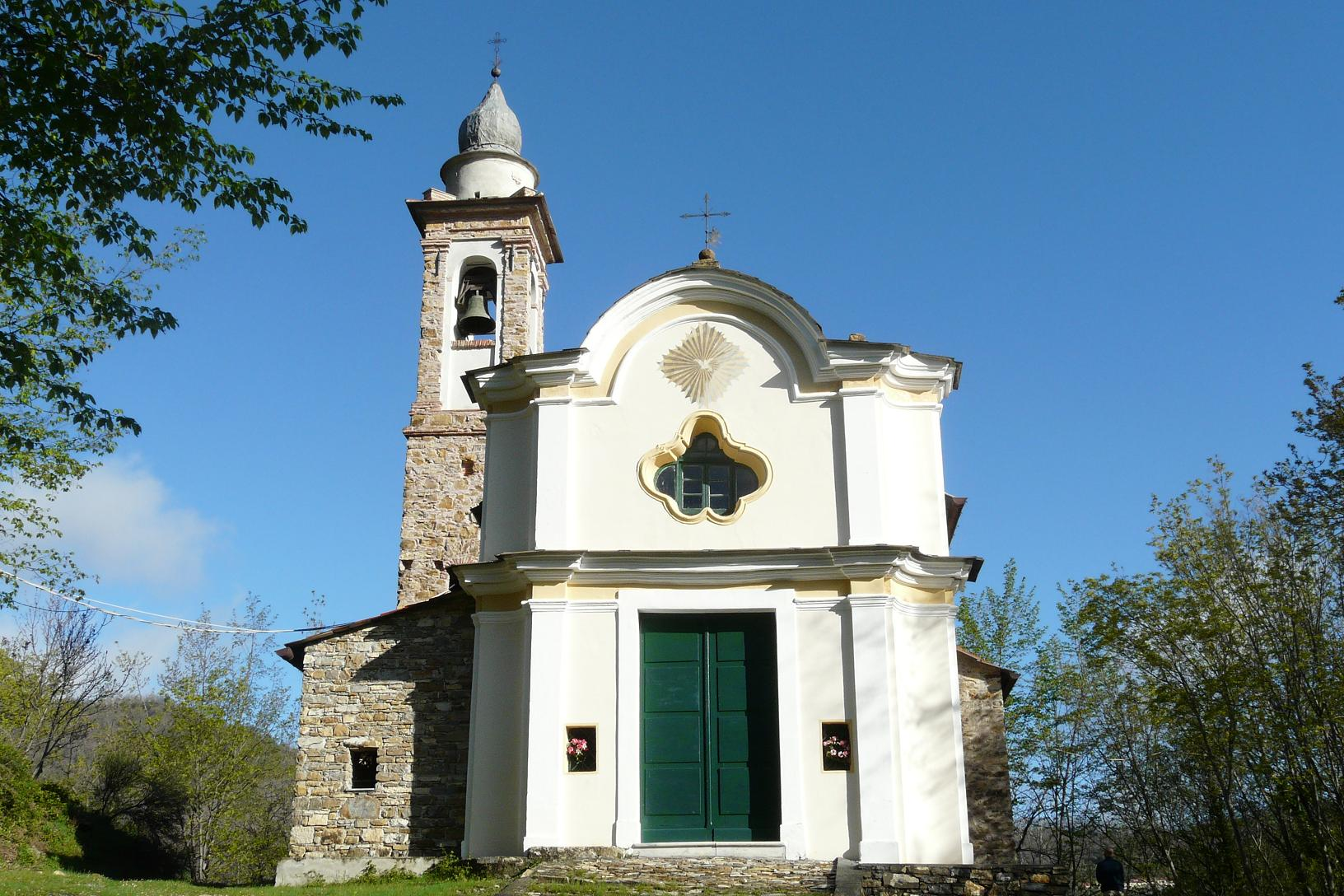
- Church of Madonna of Loreto

- Coat of arms

- Location within Italy Location within Liguria
- Coordinates: 44°0′N 8°4′E
- Country: Italy
- Region: Liguria
- Province: Savona (SV)
- Frazioni: Berghi, Ciantà, Duranti, Rossi, San Damiano, Villarelli, Auberti

Government
  - Mayor: Claudio Cavallo

Area
  - Total: 17.5 km^{2} (6.8 sq mi)
- Elevation: 141 m (463 ft)

Population (31 December 2010)
  - Total: 877
  - Density: 50.1/km^{2} (130/sq mi)
- Demonym: Stellanesi
- Time zone: UTC+1 (CET)
  - Summer (DST): UTC+2 (CEST)
- Postal code: 17020
- Dialing code: 0182

Stellanello (Ligurian: Stenanelo) is a comune (municipality) in the Province of Savona in the Italian region Liguria, located about 80 kilometres (50 mi) southwest of Genoa and about 45 kilometres (28 mi) southwest of Savona.
