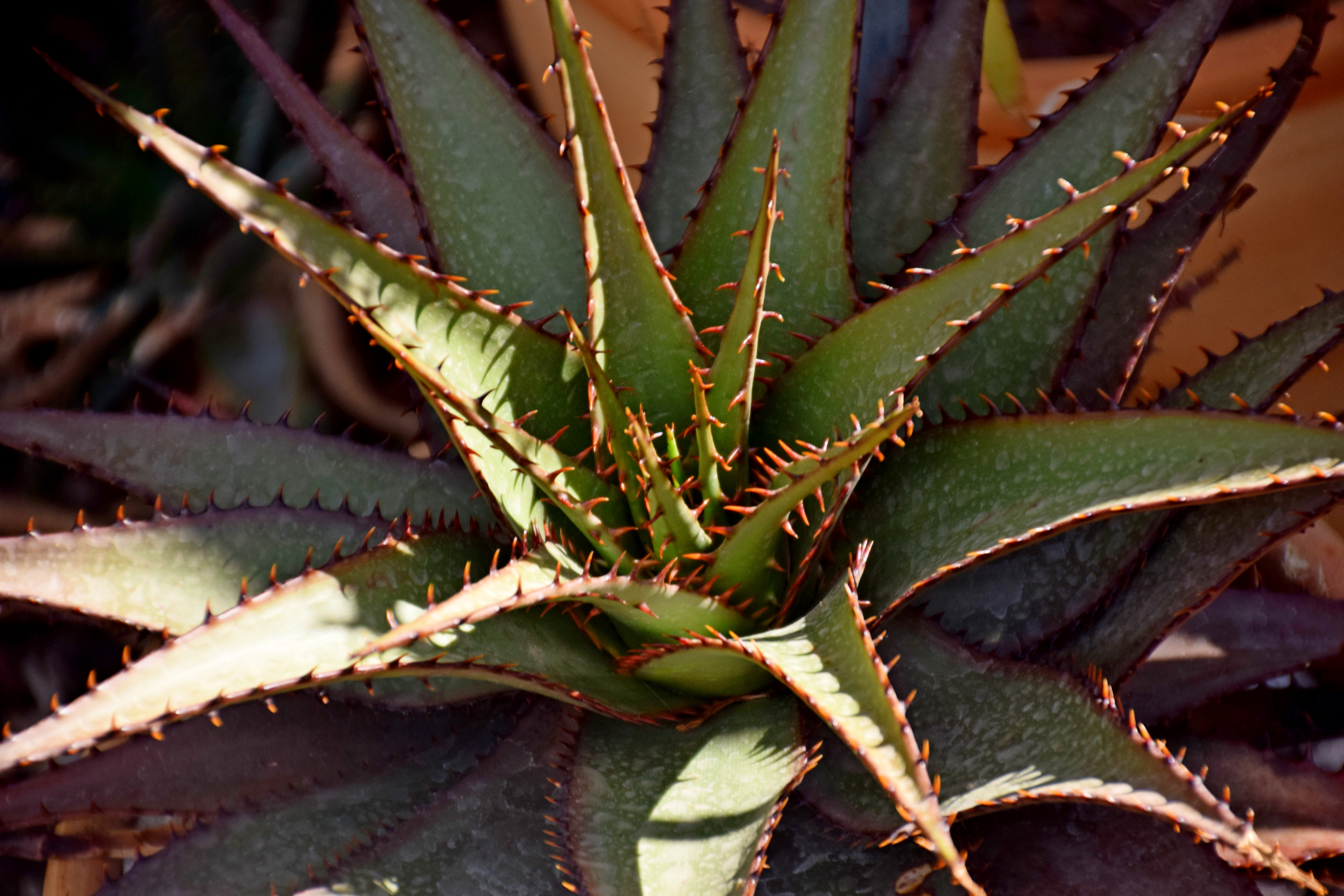

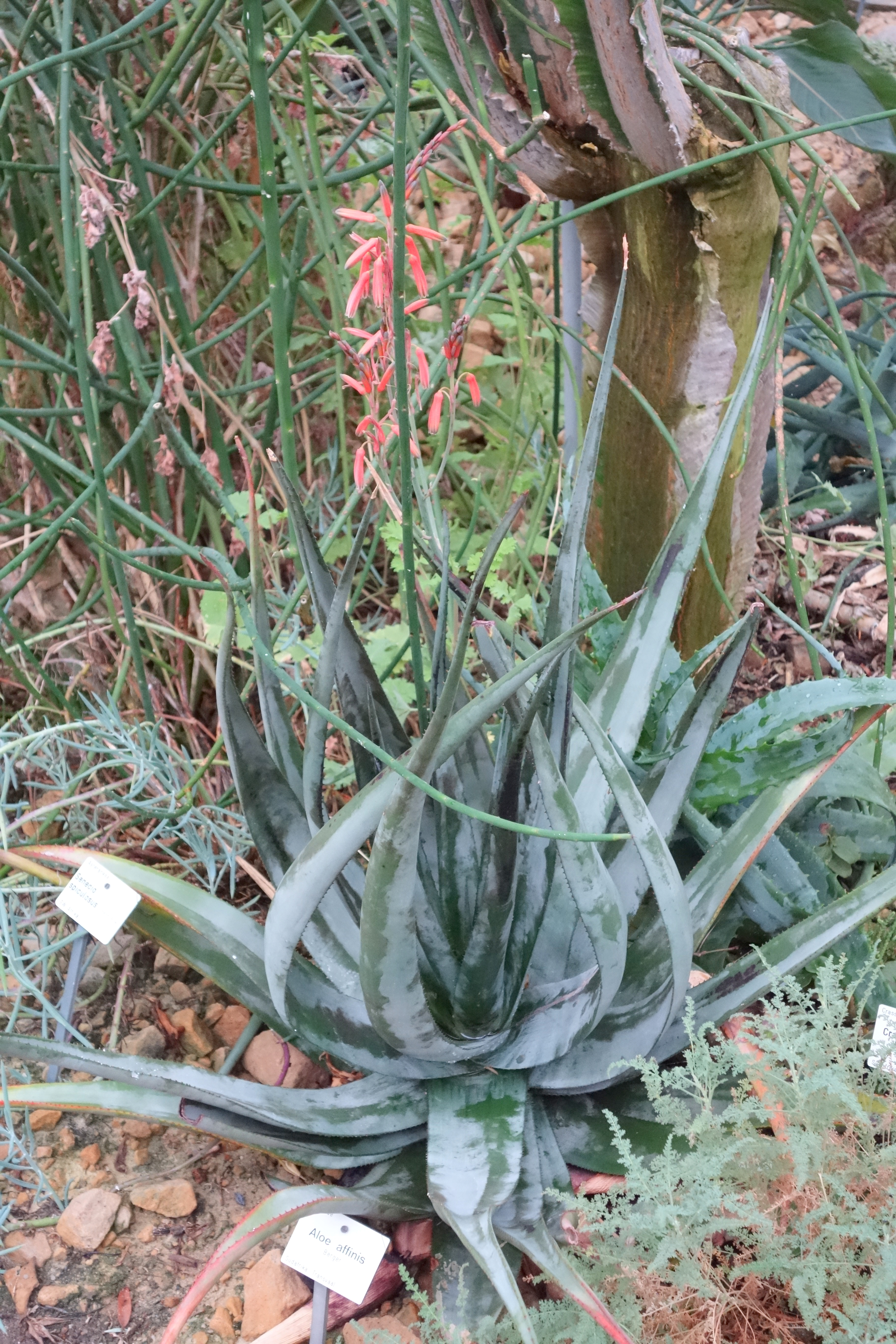

Conservation status
- CITES Appendix II

Scientific classification
- Kingdom: Plantae
- Clade: Tracheophytes
- Clade: Angiosperms
- Clade: Monocots
- Order: Asparagales
- Family: Asphodelaceae
- Subfamily: Asphodeloideae
- Genus: Aloe
- Species: A. affinis

Binomial name
- Aloe affinis A.Berger

= Aloe affinis =

Species of flowering plant

Aloe affinis is a species of flowering plant in the Asphodelaceae family. It is endemic to Limpopo, Gauteng, and Mpumalanga, of South Africa. It grows 200–300 mm (7.9–11.8 in) tall excluding inflorescence, with 16–20 leaves per plant, each leaf being roughly 200 mm long x 50–100 mm wide.

== Sources ==
- Das Pflanzenreich IV, 38: 206 1908.
- The Plant List entry
- Encyclopedia of Life entry
- JSTOR entry
- Red List of South African Plants
