= Hilda Beatrice Currie =

British voluntary worker and Liberal Party politician

Lady Currie, as seen in The Times in 1922

Hilda Beatrice Currie (born Hilda Beatrice Hanbury; 24 July 1872 – 19 September 1939) was a British voluntary worker and Liberal Party politician.

== Early life, Italy ==
She was the only daughter of the Quakers, Sir Thomas Hanbury and Katherine Aldam Pease of Ventimiglia, Italy. She grew up at the botanical gardens her parents were creating.

She lived much of her early life in Italy, where she was closely identified with the training of nurses, for which she was decorated by Elena of Montenegro, the Queen of Italy. She founded and maintained the first school for hospital nurses in Italy at Rome, for which she received the Benemerenti medal from the Pope.

== Wiltshire ==
After moving to Britain she took up residence in Upham House, Aldbourne, Wiltshire, which she had purchased in 1909.

In 1913 she married Sir James Currie. When her husband was knighted in 1920 for his services as Director of Training, Ministry of Labour, she became Lady Currie.

She joined the Liberal party and became a member of the executive of the Women's National Liberal Committee, also serving as its treasurer. She undertook much local voluntary work regarding nursing and the welfare of the blind. She was selected as Liberal candidate for the Devizes Division of Wiltshire at the 1922 general election; as her home constituency, she was already known to a number of the local electorate. This was a Unionist seat that the Liberals had not won since their landslide victory of 1906. At the previous general election in 1918, the Unionists had polled two-thirds of the vote. Although the Unionists held the seat, Lady Currie was able to reduce their majority.

General Election 1922: Devizes Electorate 24,937
Party	Candidate	Votes	%	±%
Unionist	William Cory Heward Bell	9,598	59.3	−4.5
Liberal	Lady Currie	6,576	40.7	+4.5
Majority			18.6	−9.0
Turnout			64.9	+11.8
Unionist hold		Swing	-4.5	

Her husband died in 1937. In 1939 she died at home of pneumonia.
