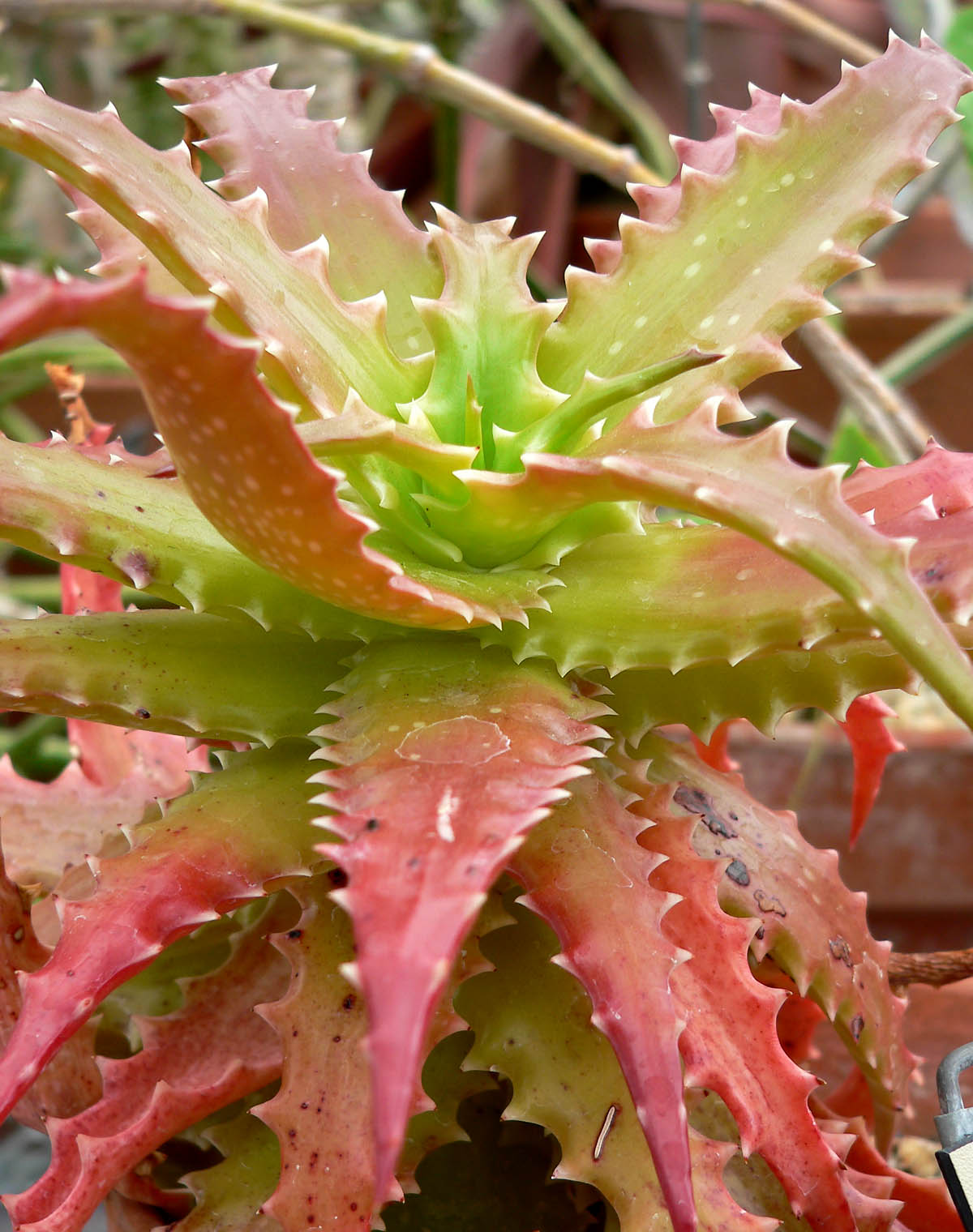

Conservation status
- Critically Endangered (IUCN 3.1)
- CITES Appendix II

Scientific classification
- Kingdom: Plantae
- Clade: Embryophytes
- Clade: Tracheophytes
- Clade: Angiosperms
- Clade: Monocots
- Order: Asparagales
- Family: Asphodelaceae
- Subfamily: Asphodeloideae
- Genus: Aloe
- Species: A. dorotheae

Binomial name
- Aloe dorotheae A.Berger

Synonyms
- Aloe harmsii A.Berger

= Aloe dorotheae =

Species of succulent plant

Aloe dorotheae is a critically endangered succulent plant in the family Asphodelaceae. It is native to Tanzania.

== Description ==
Its leaves are recurved, spotted, and have a glossy surface. They turn a strong reddish colour during times of drought or under stressed, exposed conditions. The stems are sprawling and decumbent, and it can eventually form large clumps.

== Distribution and habitat ==
The species has a very restricted distribution in the wild, limited to only two localities consisting of rocky outcrops in the Eastern Arc Mountains of Tanzania, but is common and popular as an ornamental in cultivation. It requires well-drained soil, some exposure to sun, and it prefers a summer-rainfall watering regime.

It is one of 16 aloe species which are endemic to Tanzania, and one of a further 26 aloe species which are indigenous (but not endemic) to that country. (Note: Note: Tanzania Aloe endemics: A. babatiensis, boscawenii, brachystachys, brandhamii, bukobana, bullockii, bussei, congdonii, dorotheae, flexilifolia, leachii, leedalii, leptosiphon, massawana, pembana, richardsiae. Tanzania Aloe indigenous: A. parvidens; lateritia; secundiflora; rabaiensis; volkensii; wollastonii; macrosiphon; ballyi, confusa, deserti, elata, fibrosa, morijensis, ngongensis; bicomitum, fimbrialis, veseyi; duckeri; mzimbana; bulbicaulis, nuttii; christianii; mawii; chabaudii; myriacantha)

== Conservation ==
Aloe dorotheae is classified as Critically Endangered by the IUCN based on its extremely limited distribution, which overlaps with a heavily populated district. It is likely being collected for medicinal purposes.
