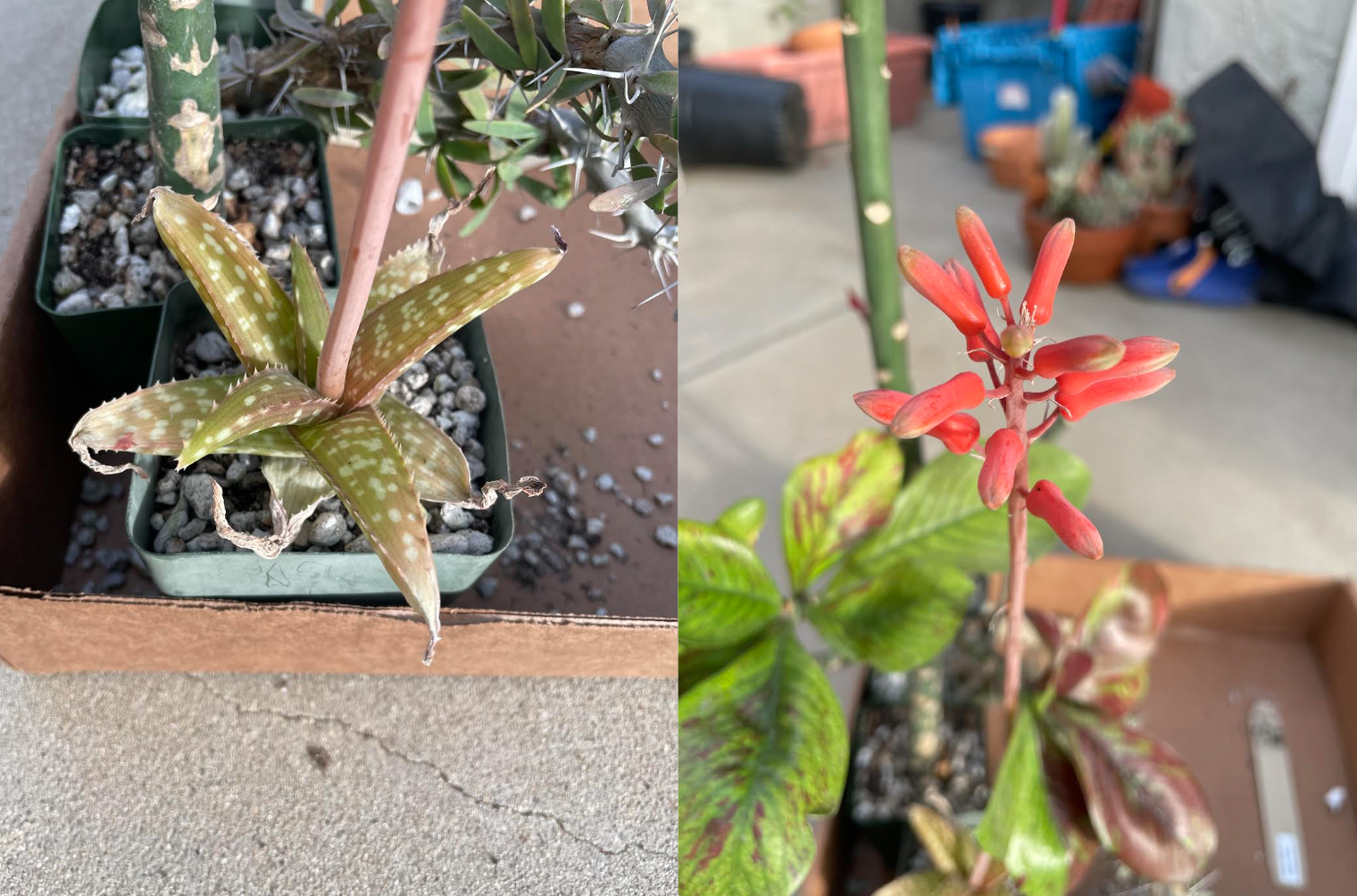

Conservation status
- Least Concern (IUCN 3.1)
- CITES Appendix II

Scientific classification
- Kingdom: Plantae
- Clade: Embryophytes
- Clade: Tracheophytes
- Clade: Spermatophytes
- Clade: Angiosperms
- Clade: Monocots
- Order: Asparagales
- Family: Asphodelaceae
- Subfamily: Asphodeloideae
- Genus: Aloe
- Species: A. ellenbeckii

Binomial name
- Aloe ellenbeckii A.Berger

Synonyms
- Aloe dumetorum B.Mathew & Brandham

= Aloe ellenbeckii =

Species of plant

Aloe ellenbeckii is a small aloe native to the border tripoint between Kenya, Ethiopia, and Somalia. It was first described in 1905.

== Description ==
This aloe is a slow, low growing aloe native to the border tripoint of Kenya, Ethiopia, Somolia. Leaves in rosette with white spots, and leaves can end in tips, or rounded tips. Barely visible stripes slightly darker than the leaf color can be visible. Flowers like many other aloes. Orange tubular, with a white tip on the petals. Flowers on a long stalk. Single flower on each stalk.
