= George Watt (botanist) =

Scottish physician and botanist

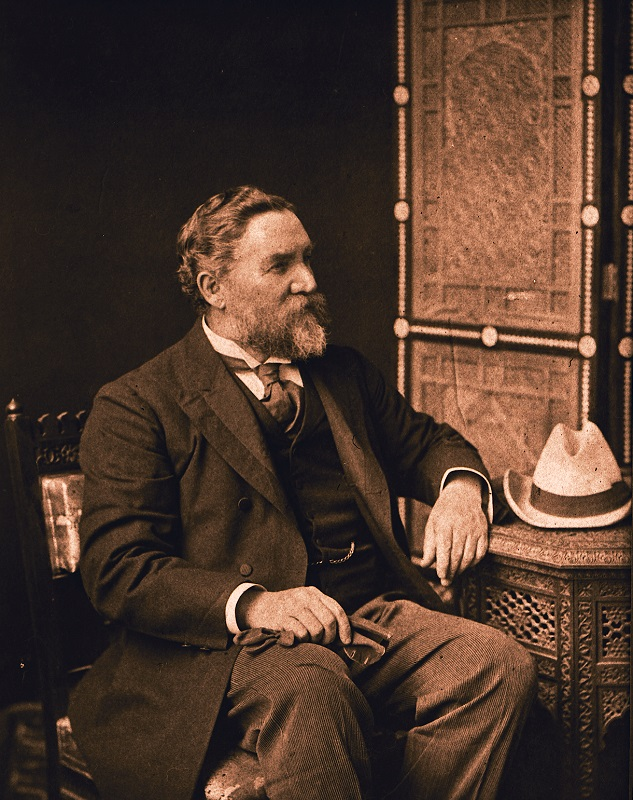
A portrait from the archives of the Royal Botanic Gardens, Edinburgh

Sir George Watt CIE FLS (24 April 1851 – 2 April 1930) was a Scottish physician and botanist who worked in India as "Reporter" on economic botany and during the course of his career in India he compiled a major multivolume work, The Dictionary of Economic Products of India, the last volume of which was published in 1893. An abridged edition of his work was also published as the single volume Commercial Products of India in 1908. He is honoured in the binomials of several plants named after him.

== Life and career ==
Watt was born in Old Meldrum, Aberdeenshire, Scotland, the third son of John Watt. He was educated at Grammar School, King's College and Marischal College, Aberdeen, and later attended both the University of Aberdeen and the University of Glasgow. He received the degrees of M.B. and C.M. in 1873. He enjoyed teaching and joined the University of Glasgow as a prodissector to the Professor of Anatomy. Around 1864, there was a famine in Orissa and the then Lieutenant-Governor of Bengal, Sir George Campbell was firm that agricultural education was key to avoiding similar disasters and following the recommendations of Sir John Strachey's Famine Commission, a need to carry out scientific study to improve the food supply in India was noted. In order to fulfil this requirement, and on the recommendation of J.D. Hooker, he was selected for the post Professor of Botany, at Presidency College, Calcutta University and joined there in 1873–74. He taught for ten years at a college in Hoogly and at the same time began to study the local botany and began to form a private herbarium. He followed a system of numbering specimens in the field with numbered tag labels detached from similarly numbered sheets in the field to avoid mistakes in labelling. In 1879 he travelled around northwest Punjab and he described several new plant species from the Chamba region. In 1881 he was posted as surgeon to the Burma-Manipur Delimitation Commission with special permission to conduct botanical studies during the expedition. On his return he was made in charge of the Calcutta International Exhibition for 1883–84. Watt organized a 1700-page catalogue for the economic section of the exhibition that was in charge of. Towards the end of the exhibition, the government suggested that the catalogue should be expanded. The expanded version was ready for the Colonial and Indian Exhibition of London in 1886. This was later to become the first volume of his work and he was made a CIE for his work. On his return to India, he was put in charge of the Indian Museum and appointed Reporter on Economic Products under the Department of Revenue and Agriculture. Isaac Henry Burkill worked as an assistant reporter. He organized another exhibition for the Delhi Exhibition of Indian Art on 2 January 1902 and published Indian Art at Delhi. Watt edited the Agricultural Ledger, a government bulletin that collated notes on agricultural products and practices sent by officers posted across India. As an economic botanist, he also published books on cotton and cacao.

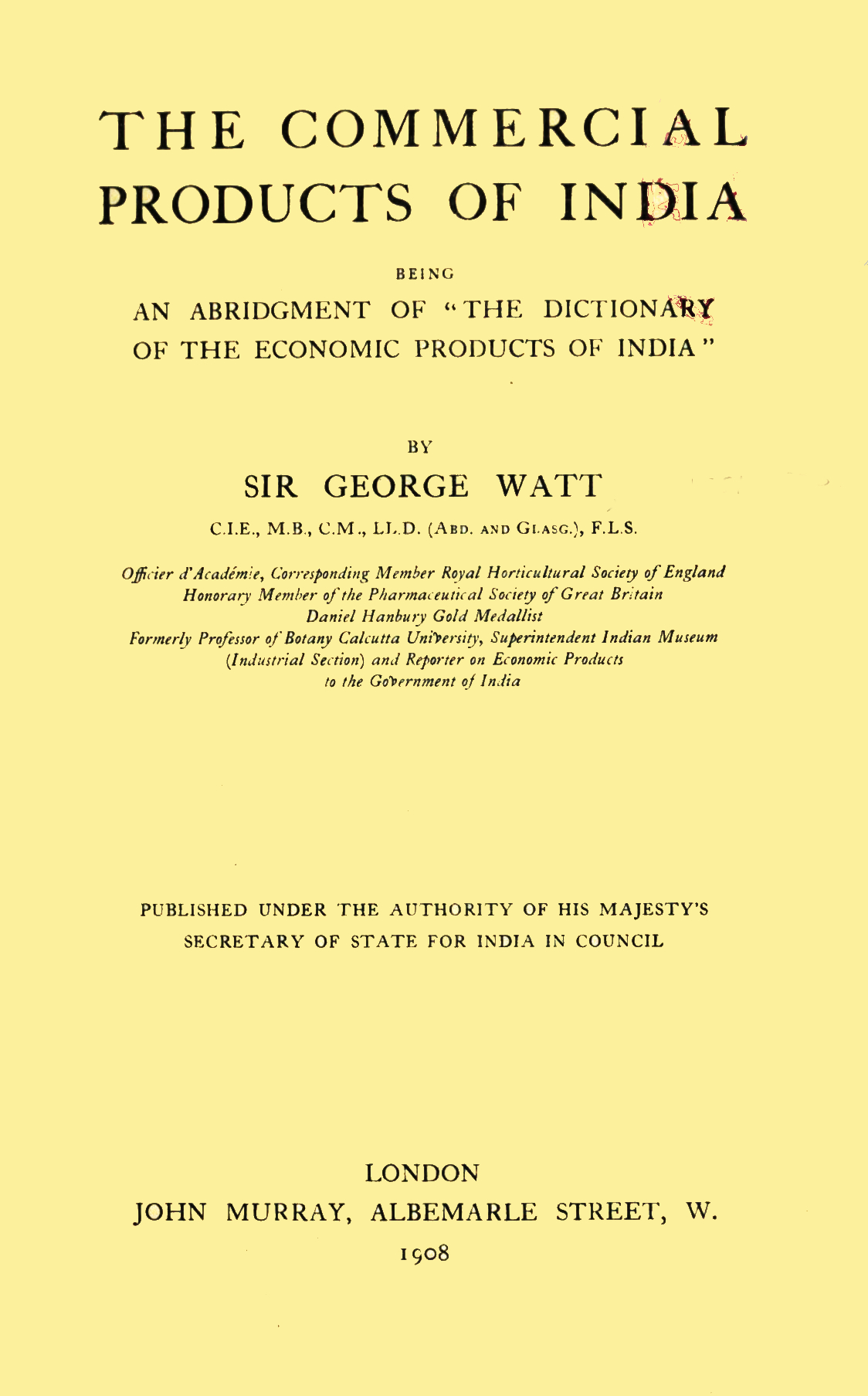
Title page of the 1908 Commercial Products of India

During the course of his career in India the positions he was appointed to included special duty in connection with Burma-Manipur Boundary Commission as Medical Officer, 1882; Scientific Assistant Secretary, Government of India, 1881; in charge of the India Section of the Calcutta International Exhibition, 1884; Commissioner, Colonial and Indian Exhibition, London, 1885–86; Reporter to Government of India on Economic Products, 1887–1903; Governor of Imperial Institute, 1892; Editor, The Agricultural Ledger, 1892–1903; President, Pharmacological Section of the Indian Medical Congress, 1894; in charge of Calcutta Industrial Museum, 1894–03; Honorary Secretary, Indigenous Drug Committee of India, 1901; Director, Indian Art Exhibition, Delhi, 1903.

Aside from work, Watt also took an interest in missionary work in India. In 1873 he married Jane, daughter of Robert Simmie, a customs officer at Lossiemouth. They had a son and two daughters.

== Retirement ==
He retired in 1906 and settled in Lockerbie, Scotland. For five years he lectured on Indian trees to forestry students at Edinburgh University. He also published a taxonomic work on the Primulas of India. In 1912 he made a trip to the island of São Tomé. In Lockerbie, he served as a County Councillor and as a Justice of Peace. He helped in developing the gardens of the Crichton Royal Institution at Dumfries. He died at his home in Lockerbie on 2 April 1930.

== Publications ==
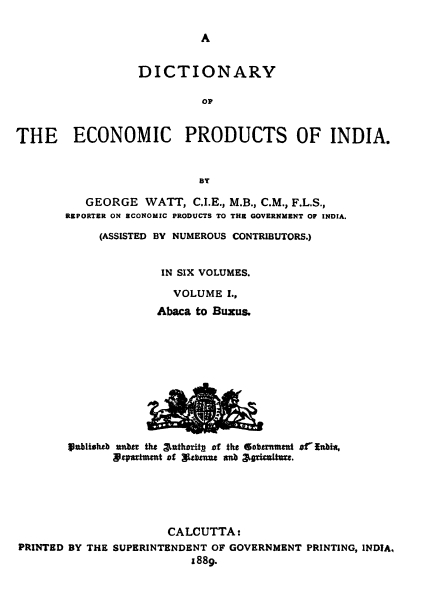
Title page of the first volume

Watt's first work on the catalogue of the exhibits at the Calcutta International Exhibition was published in 1883 and consisted of four volumes with seven parts in them. The exhibits themselves had been organized by Trailokhya Nath Mukharji, a civil servant who later served as a curator of the economic section at the Indian Museum. He was assisted by botanists as well as Indian physicians with a knowledge of medicinal plants including Dr Moodeen Sheriff of Madras, Kanny Lall Dey of Calcutta and Dr Udoy Chand Dutt of Serampore.

- Volume I. which included:
  - Part I. Gums and Resins.
  - Part II. Dyes, Tans, and Mordants.
  - Part III. Fibers and Fibre-yielding plants.
  - Part IV. Oils and Oil seeds, Perfumery, and Soaps. Index.
- Part V. Medicinal Products
- Part VI. Foods, Food-stuffs, and Fodders
- Part VII. Timbers

This was developed further into Watt's Dictionary of the Economic Products of India published from 1889 to 1893 and projected to be in six volumes but it grew larger and the additions were accommodated by breaking up the last volume into four parts. It is considered by many as the greatest compilation of the commercial plants (and natural products) of India. Although there were similar subsequent works like the Wealth of India series, Watt's work continues to be a major source for research. Watt's compilation included descriptions of other natural products such as silk, oysters and minerals.

- Volume I. Abaca to Buxus (1889)
- Volume II. Cabbage to Cyperus (1890)
- Volume III. Dacrydium to Gordonia (1890)
- Volume IV. Gossypium to Linociera (1890)
- Volume V. Linum to Oyster (1891)
- Volume VI. Part 1. Pachyrhizus to Rye (1892)
- Volume VI. Part 2. Sabadilla to Silica (1893)
- Volume VI. Part 3. Silk to Tea (1893)
- Volume VI. Part 4. Tectona to Zygophillum and Index (1893)

Watt's assistant I.H. Burkill, who moved to the Straits Settlement published A dictionary of the economic products of the Malay Peninsula in two volumes in 1935. It was broadly modelled on the lines of Watt's work.

Watt made a study of tea cultivation in Assam and Kangra and published a report of the pests and diseases affecting it in 1898.

== Awards and honours ==
Watt won the Daniel Hanbury Gold medal in 1901, and was knighted in the 1903 Durbar Honours. He was also an Officier d'Academe; Corresponding Member of the Royal Horticultural Society: Fellow of the Royal Society, Haarlem; and President of the Richmond Athenæum, 1907.

A rhododendron (Rhododendron wattii) was named after him by Cowan and an iris (Iris wattii) was named after him by Joseph Dalton Hooker. Eranthemum wattii (originally Daedalacanthus wattii) was described and named after him by R. H. Beddome. Other plants named after him include Clematis wattii and Primula wattii.
