= Giardini Botanici Hanbury =

Botanical garden in Liguria, Italy

Coordinates: 43°46′57.71″N 7°33′20.12″E

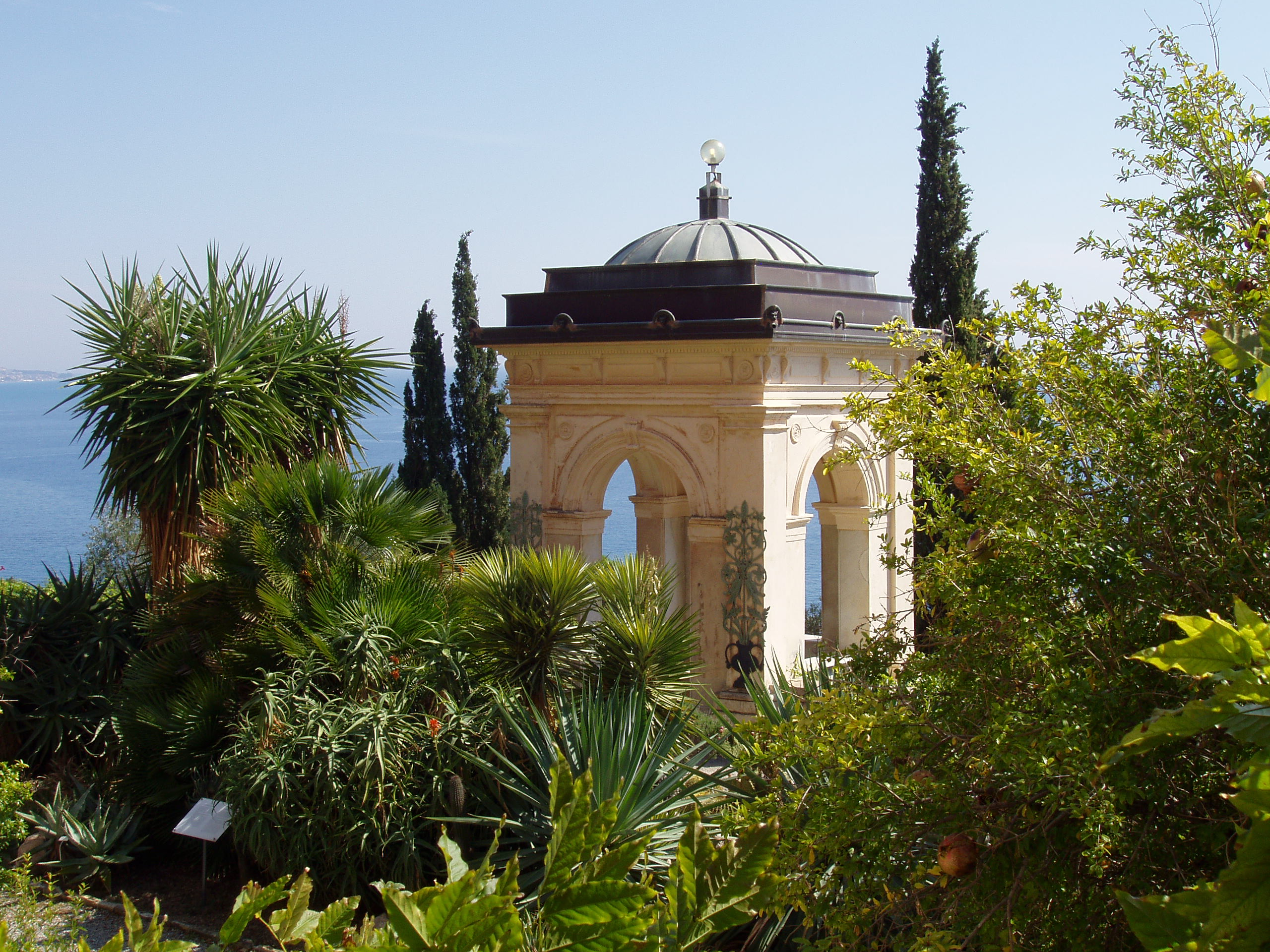
- Interactive map of Giardini Botanici Hanbury
- Type: Botanical
- Location: Ventimiglia, Italy
- Area: 18 hectares (44 acres)
- Opened: 1867
- Operator: University of Genoa
- Website: giardinihanbury.com

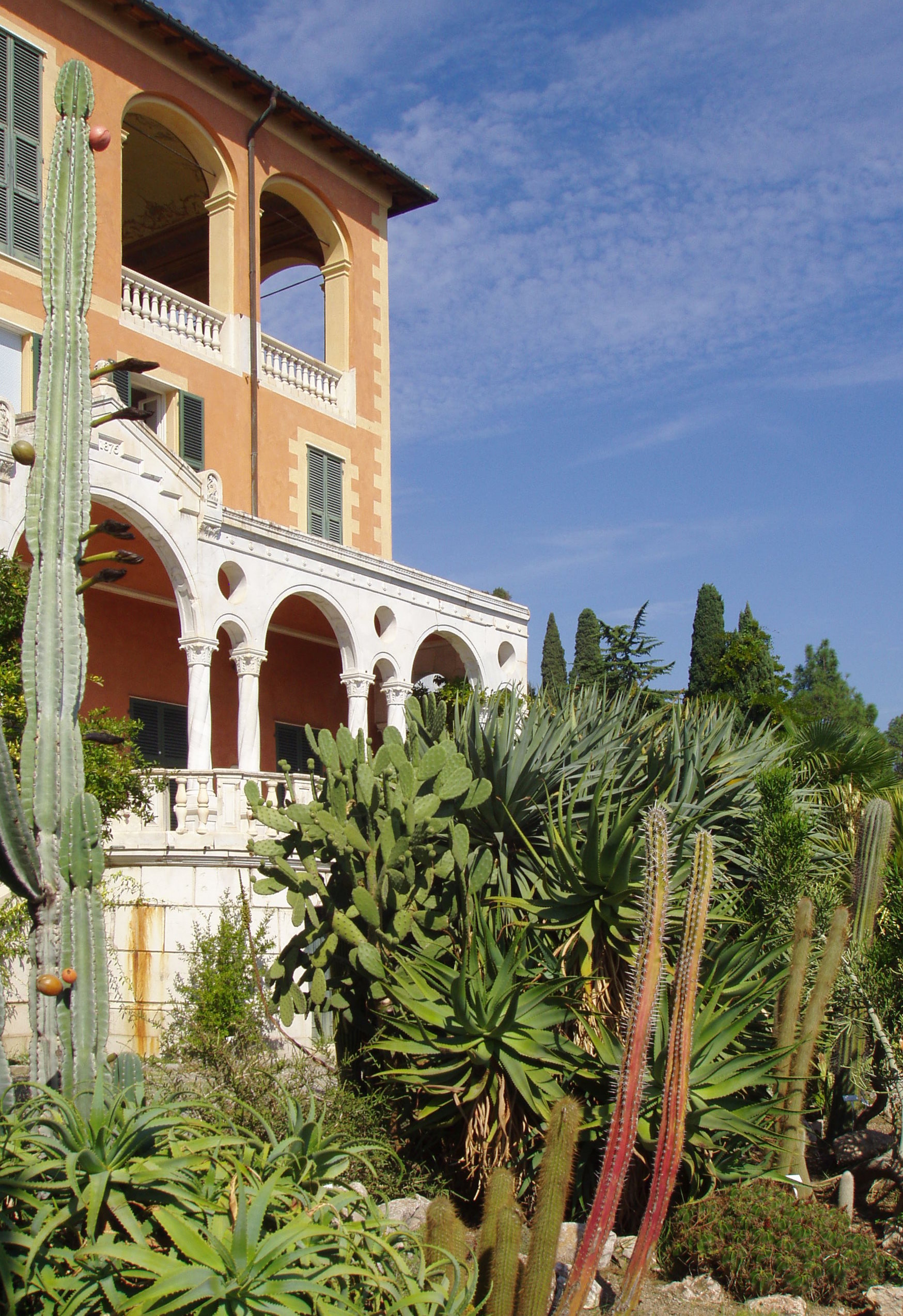
Villa

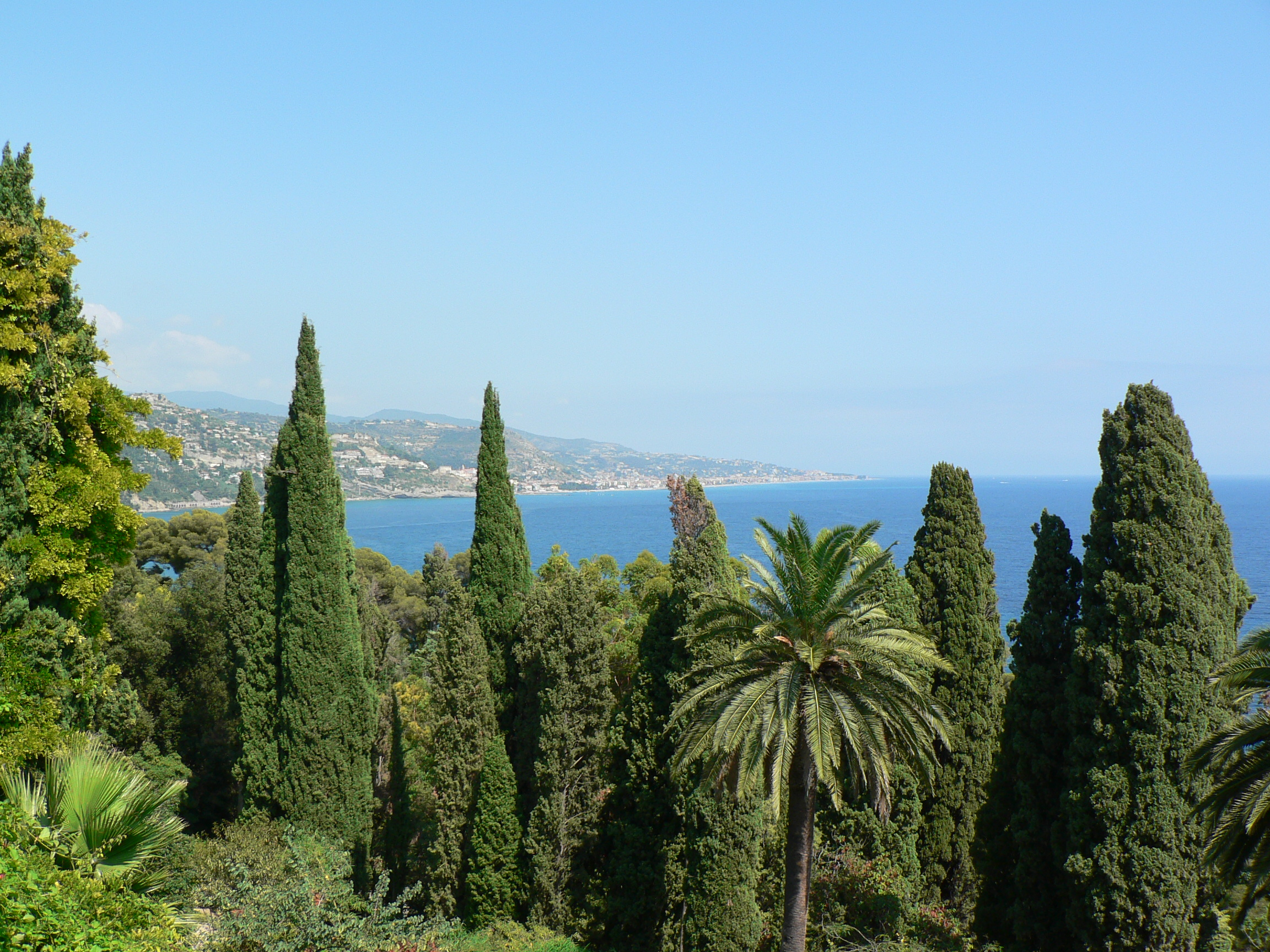
General view

The Giardini Botanici Hanbury, also known as Villa Hanbury, are major botanical gardens operated by the University of Genoa. They are located at Corso Montecarlo 43, Mortola Inferiore, several km west of Ventimiglia, Italy.

== History ==
The gardens were established by Sir Thomas Hanbury on a small, steep peninsula jutting southwards from an altitude of 103 meters down into the Mediterranean Sea. He purchased the extant Palazzo Orengo property in 1867, and over decades created the garden with the aid of pharmacologist Daniel Hanbury (his brother), the botanist and landscape designer Ludwig Winter, and scientists including Gustav Cronemayer, Kurt Dinter, and Alwin Berger. In 1912 the Hortus Mortolensis, the catalogue of the garden, contained 5800 species, although the garden itself had more. Hanbury died in 1907, but energetic plantings and improvements resumed after World War I under the direction of his daughter-in-law Lady Dorothy Hanbury.

Restoration

The gardens were severely damaged in World War II, when they became a no-man's land and in 1960 Lady Hanbury sold them to the State of Italy. Initially its care was entrusted to the International Institute of Ligurian Studies but when they withdrew for lack of adequate funds in 1983 responsibility was passed to the University of Genoa. Restoration has been gradually proceeding since 1987 and it was declared a nature preserve in 2000.

On 1 June 2006 the Ministero dei Beni e delle Attività Culturali submitted a proposal for the inclusion of the gardens on the list of UNESCO World Heritage Sites.

In 2007 and 2011 Villa Hanbury was included in the list of the 10 most beautiful gardens in Italy.

== Plant collections ==
Today 9 of the gardens' 18 hectares are under cultivation, and contain about 2500 taxa. Many of the species are plants of Mediterranean climates from the six Mediterranean climate zones of the world.

Major collections include agaves, aloes, and salvia, as well as fine old specimens of Araucaria cunninghamii (planted 1832), Casimiroa edulis (1867), olive trees, Olmediella betschleriana, and Pinus canariensis (1870). An orchard of rare fruits includes Actinidia, Carica, Diospyros, Eugenia, Feijoa, Fortunella, Macadamia, Mespilus germanica, and Persea.

Additional collections feature palms, succulents, Australian trees, citrus, and cultivated flowers. Of particular interest are the Aphyllanthes monspeliensis, Beaucarnea recurvata, Beaucarnea stricta, Caesalpinia sepiaria, Chiranthodendron pentadactylon, Chrysanthemum discoideum, Coronilla juncea, Cupressus lusitanica, Eucalyptus citriodora, Eucalyptus sideroxylon, Eucalyptus microcorys, Hesperocyparis guadalupensis, Mandevilla laxa, Passiflora bryonioides, Passiflora amethistina, Passiflora edulis, Senecio deltoideus, Sollya heterophylla, Thunbergia grandiflora, Thunbergia coccinea, Thunbergia mysorensis, Wigandia urens, and Yucca australis.

== Publications ==
The first index seminum or seed list of the gardens was published in 1883, and contained 557 species; it was published annually thereafter. The seed lists were distributed to other botanical gardens, which could request seeds. In 1908 more than 13,000 packets of seed were despatched.

The first catalogues of the gardens, one alphabetical and one systematic, were published by Gustav Cronemeyer in 1889, and contained about 3600 species. A second edition was published by Kurt Dinter in 1897. The third edition, published in 1912 by Alwin Berger with the title Hortus Mortolensis, contained almost 6000 species. The wild flowers of the gardens were separately catalogued by Berger in 1907.

The principal publications of the gardens are:

- Gustav Cronemeyer (1889). Alphabetical Catalogue of plants growing in the open air in the garden of Thomas Hanbury, Palazzo Orengo, La Mortola near Ventimiglia, Italy. Erfurt: G.A. Koenig.
- ——— (1889). Systematic catalogue of plants growing in the open air in the garden of Thomas Hanbury F.L.S., Knight of the Order of St. Maurice and St. Lazarus, and Officer of the Cross of the Crown of Italy: Palazzo Orengo, La Mortola near Ventimiglia, Italy. Erfurt: G.A. Koenig.
- Kurt Dinter (1897). Alphabetical Catalogue of plants growing in the open air in the garden of Thomas Hanbury, Palazzo Orengo, La Mortola near Ventimiglia, Italy. Genoa: Waser.
- Alwin Berger (1905). Florula Mortolensis. An enumeration of the plants growing wild at La Mortola. Ventimiglia: Billi.
- ——— (1912). Hortus Mortolensis : enumeratio plantarum in horto Mortolensi cultarum: Alphabetical catalogue of plants growing in the garden of the late Sir T. Hanbury at La Mortola, Ventimiglia, Italy. London: West, Newman.
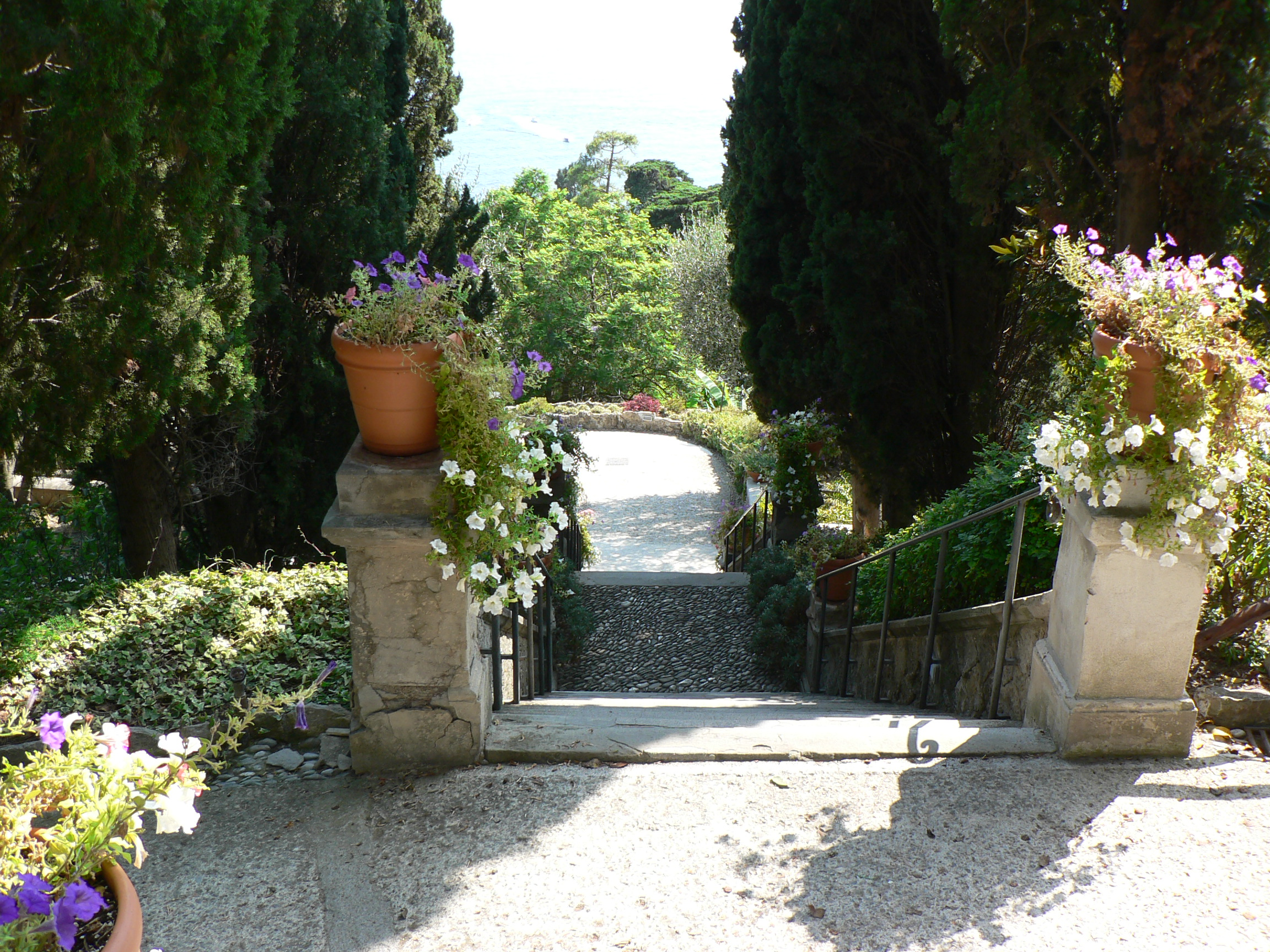

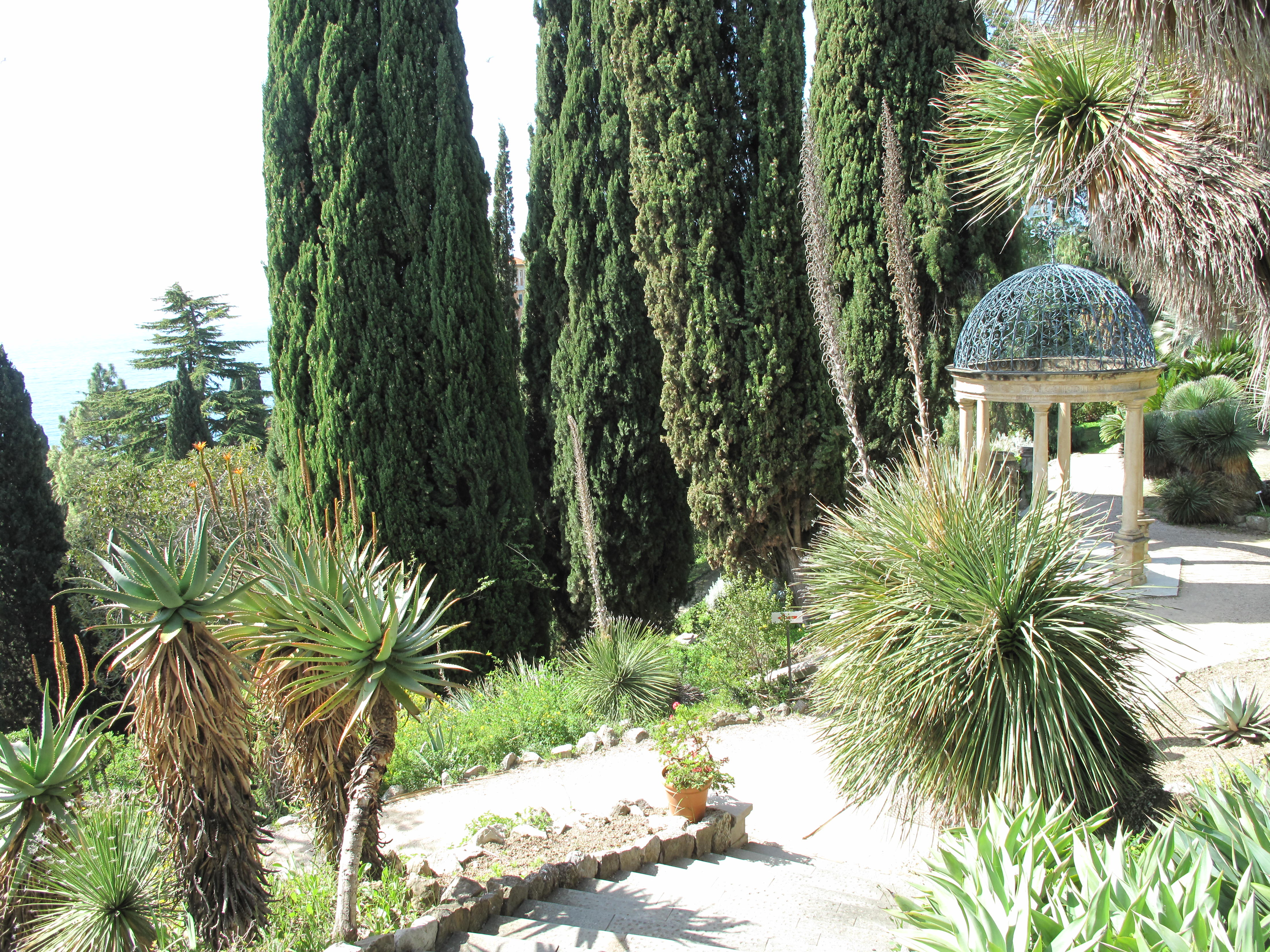
The Tempietto

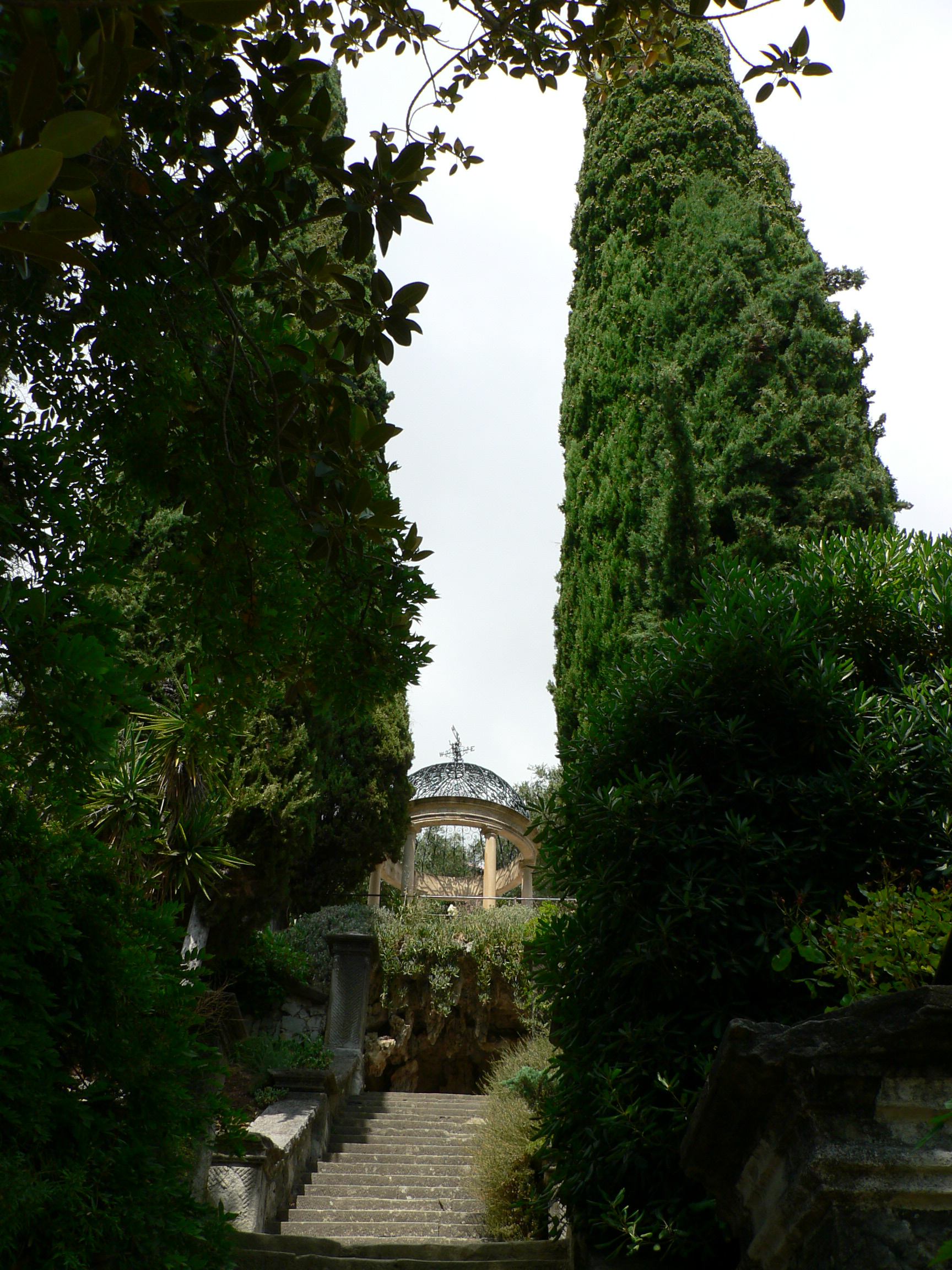

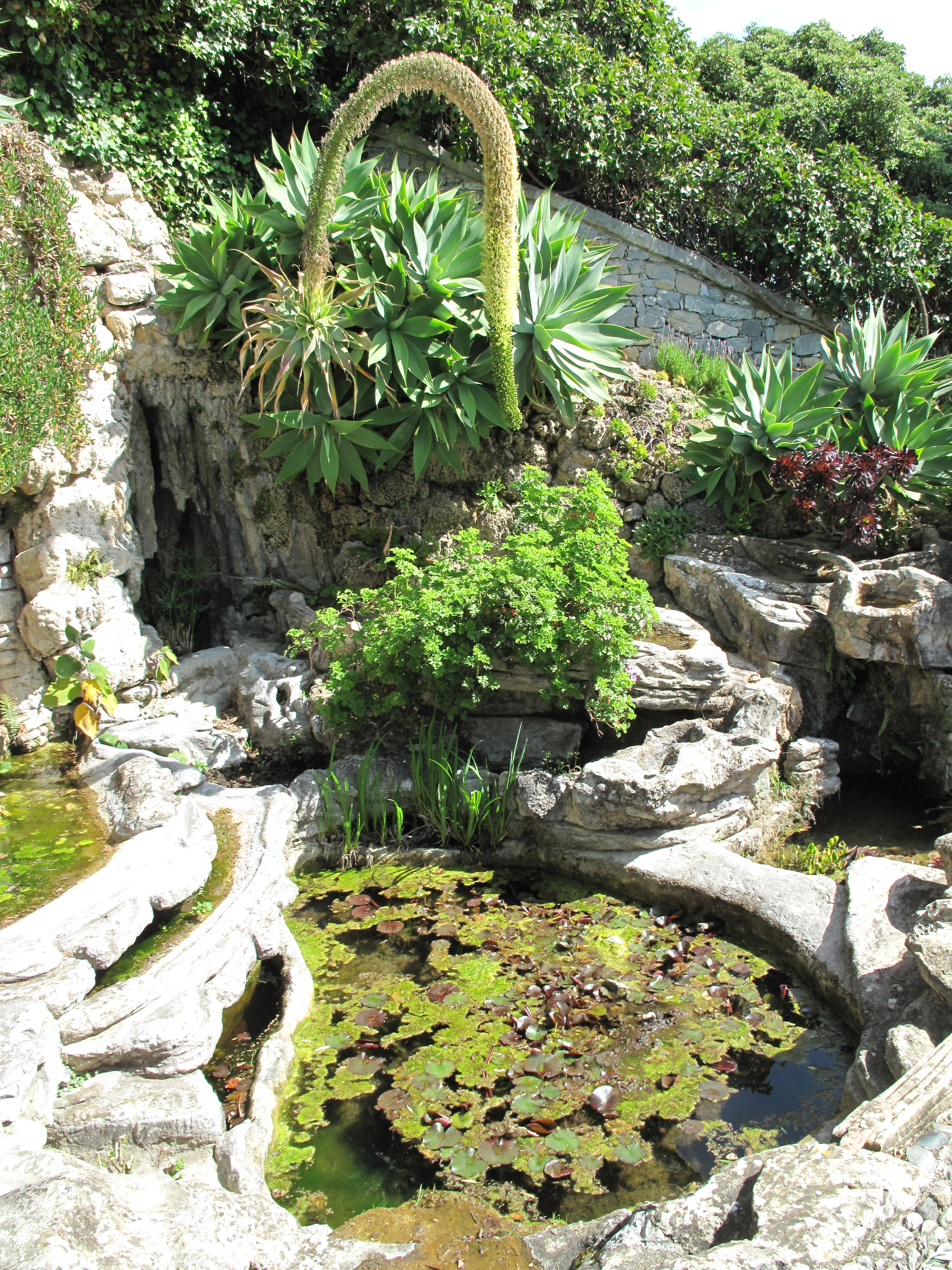

== See also ==
- Mediterranean forests, woodlands, and scrub – biome
- List of botanical gardens in Italy
