= Daniel Hanbury =

British botanist and pharmacologist (1825–1875)

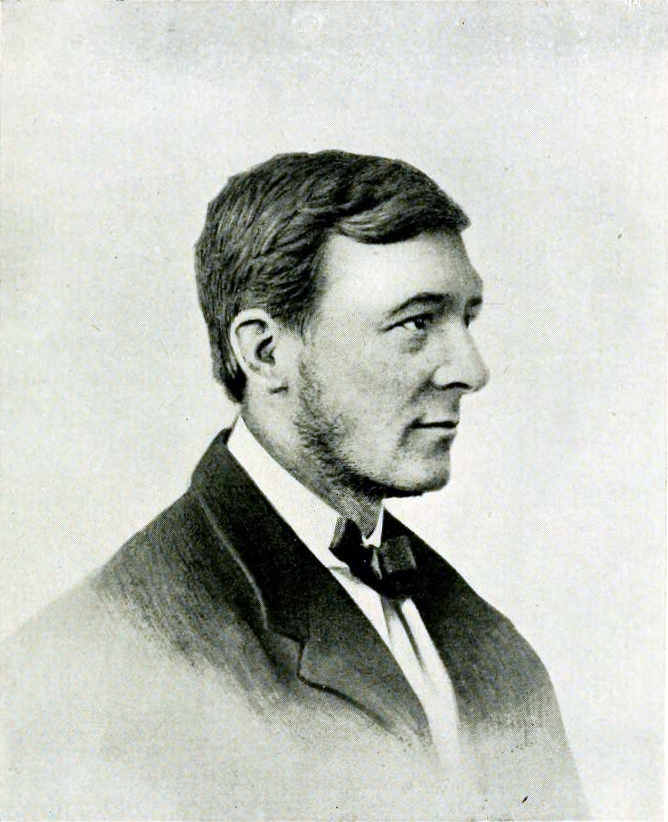
- Portrait of Daniel Hanbury, from Hortus Mortolensis, 1912
- Born: 11 September 1825; Clapham, Surrey
- Died: 24 March 1875 (aged 49); Clapham
- Resting place: Quaker burial ground, Wandsworth
- Education: Pharmaceutical Society
- Known for: Giardini Botanici Hanbury, La Mortola
- Scientific career
- Fields: pharmacology, botany, pharmacognosy
- Workplaces: London, La Mortola
- Author abbrev. (botany): D.Hanb

Daniel Hanbury FRS (11 September 1825 – 24 March 1875) was a British botanist and pharmacologist. He was an early student of pharmacognosy, the study of the medicinal applications of nature, principally of plants.

== Life ==
Hanbury was born on 11 September 1825 in Clapham, at that time in Surrey, the eldest son of Daniel Bell Hanbury, a Quaker pharmacist, and his wife Rachel, née Christy. He went to Clapham Grammar School in 1833, and in 1841 started work at his father's firm, Allen & Hanbury's in the City of London. In 1857 he completed his training in pharmaceutical chemistry at the Pharmaceutical Society. While there he had come into contact with pharmacist-botanists including Jacob Bell, Jonathan Pereira and Theophilus Redwood, and had become interested both in botany and in pharmacognosy, the knowledge of medicines, and particularly of their geographical and botanical origins.

Hanbury never married, was a vegetarian, and – like many of his Victorian contemporaries – opposed the use of alcohol and tobacco.

He retired from business in 1870, and in 1874, in partnership with the Swiss botanist Friedrich August Flückiger, published his Pharmacographia. He died on 24 March 1875 in Clapham of typhoid fever, and was buried in the burial ground of the Society of Friends at Wandsworth.

== Work ==
Hanbury's extensive knowledge of the world's botany was based on years of study, collecting and travel – trips to the Middle East and throughout Europe were supplemented by extensive correspondence with colleagues throughout the world. He was an essential partner to his brother, Sir Thomas Hanbury, in selecting specimens for and establishing the Giardini Botanici Hanbury at La Mortola, now maintained by the University of Genoa. On his death, Sir Thomas donated his brother's entire botanical cabinet collection to Kew Gardens, where it is now part of the Economic Botany Collection.

Hanbury's first published contribution, in volume 1 of the Transactions of the Pharmaceutical Society, was published soon after starting his work. It was followed, regularly, by a stream of articles and papers describing the pharmacological applications of various plants, insects, and chemicals, and published in such distinguished sources as the Pharmaceutical Journal and the Transactions of the Linnean Society.

During his career he was president of the British Pharmaceutical Conference, botanical examiner of the Board of Examiners of the Royal Pharmaceutical Society (1860–1872; elected member 1857), and in several other major professional capacities. He was elected a Fellow of the Royal Society in 1867.

In 1858 Berthold Carl Seemann named the Hanburia genus of South American plants in the Cucurbitaceae after him.

== Publications ==
Hanbury's published works include:

- Pharmacographia; A History of the Principal Drugs of Vegetable Origin met with in Great Britain and British India (1874) (1879 edition revised by Friedrich Flückiger)
- Science Papers, Chiefly Pharmacological and Botanical (1876), a compendium of his papers, articles and journal contributions.
