= Rhododendron wattii =

Conservation status
- Vulnerable (IUCN 2.3)

Scientific classification
- Kingdom: Plantae
- Clade: Tracheophytes
- Clade: Angiosperms
- Clade: Eudicots
- Clade: Asterids
- Order: Ericales
- Family: Ericaceae
- Genus: Rhododendron
- Species: R. wattii

Binomial name
- Rhododendron wattii Cowan

Species of plant

Rhododendron wattii is a species of plant in the family Ericaceae. It is endemic to India.

== Taxonomy ==
This species is highly questionable. It is not in cultivation, and is known only from a single drawing by Sir George Watt, made when he collected it on "Ching Sow in Manipur at 9,000 ft." in 1882. The mountain has not been identified since under this name. At least one recent expedition to the area searching for this plant has failed to find it, even though the area is still largely unexploited . Seed collected at the time of the original sighting failed to produce plants of the same description, suggesting that this species was either a small local population or a single specimen of hybrid origin between R. macabeanum and R. arboreum.
