= David Hooper (chemist) =

David Hooper (1858 – 31 January 1947) was an English pharmaceutical chemist who served as a quinologist at the cinchona plantations in Ootacamund in India. He wrote extensively on Indian medical plants and economic botany.

== Life and work ==
Hooper was born in Redhill, Surrey and studied in Chelmsford. He received a bronze medal for the best herbarium during his studies in 1878. He became a pharmaceutical chemist, winning a Pereira medal in 1880. He was posted quinologist to Madras in 1884 and before going there he studied Dutch methods of planting and quinine manufacture. He worked at Ootacamund until 1896 briefly also managing the cinchona plantations and serving as government botanist. He completed the Materia Medica of Madras (1891) which was begun by Moodeen Sheriff but incomplete due to his death. Hooper's work as a quinologist involved examining alkaloids in plants. He took an interest in traditional herbal remedies and isolated the alkaloid vasicine from Adhatoda vasica during this period. He published extensively on his work such as on the tannins of acacias. He was involved in producing the three-volume Pharmacographia Indica along with William Dymock (1832-1892), and Charles Warden (1851-1900). He then worked as an officiating reporter on economic products and in 1902 he served as government chemist. He received a Hanbury Gold Medal, given for research in natural history and drug chemistry in 1907. He also held a position as a curator of the economic and art section of the Indian Museum until his retirement in 1914. During World War I he was involved in supervising chemical work in ammunition production. In 1919 he worked at Bristol University examining plants from Asia for their chemicals.

While working in Ootacamund he met Hannah Carr, the daughter of the Baptist minister Thomas Evans and married her in 1887. They had two sons and three daughters. He died at Bromley and was buried at Islington.
