= Uday Chand Dutt =

Indian physician (1834–1884)

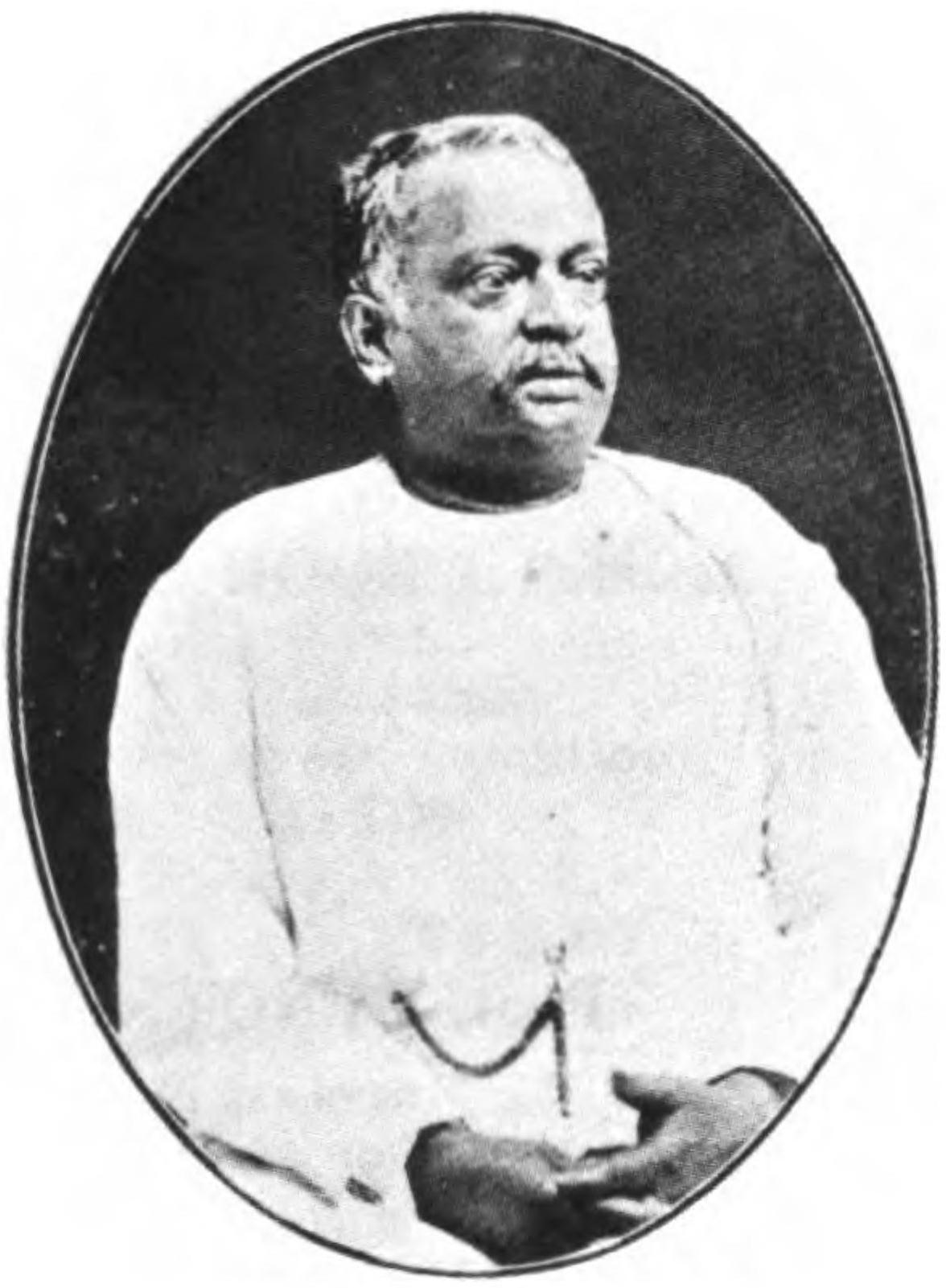

Uday Chand Dutt, also known as Udoy Chand Dutt (1834–1884) was a medical doctor and expert on Ayurveda who served as a civil medical officer in Serampore, Bengal, India. He authored The Materia Medica of the Hindus, a major English translation of Sanskrit works on traditional Indian medicine, first published in 1870. The book includes translations from several Sanskrit sources, and later editions added a glossary of botanical names prepared by George King. Dutt also assisted George Watt in producing his Dictionary of the Economic Plants of India, and his work is widely cited. A revised edition published in 1877 incorporated contributions by Binod Lall Sen, Kaviraj Ashutosh Sen, and Kaviraj Pulin Krishna Sen (Kavibhushan).

Dutt also wrote other books including Nidana: A Sanskrit System of Pathology. This was a translation of a Sanskrit work called Nidāna compiled by a low-caste Hindu named Madhava Kara for use by those classes which did not have access to the works of Charaka and Susruta.
