= Moodeen Sheriff =

Indian surgeon and practitioner of native medicine

Moodeen Sheriff, the Anglicized form of Mohideen Sheriff (died 21 February 1891) was an Indian surgeon and practitioner of herbal medicine. He worked in Madras and was the posthumous author of the Materia Medica of Madras. He was known for his expertise and knowledge of native herbal medicine and contributed to the works on economic botany by Sir George Watt. He worked for many years at the Triplicane Dispensary and was conferred the title of Khan Bahadur in 1870.

Sheriff graduated from the Madras Medical College in the 1850s and worked at the Triplicane Dispensary in 1858 where he worked until his retirement on 7 July 1889. Sheriff served as "Native Surgeon" and was made an Honorary Assistant Surgeon in December 1869. Sheriff contributed notes to the Madras Quarterly Journal of Medicine and corresponded with other physicians and pharmacists of the period. Sheriff prepared a Supplement to the Pharmacopoeia of India (1869) which included names of medicinal plants in fourteen Indian languages and was involved in selecting drugs to be exhibited at the Calcutta International Exhibition of 1883. After his death, the Materia Medica of Madras that he was working on was completed by David Hooper, the government quinologist at Ootacamund. A portrait was placed at Royapettah Hospital and in 1894 a prize was instituted at the Madras Medical College in his memory.
