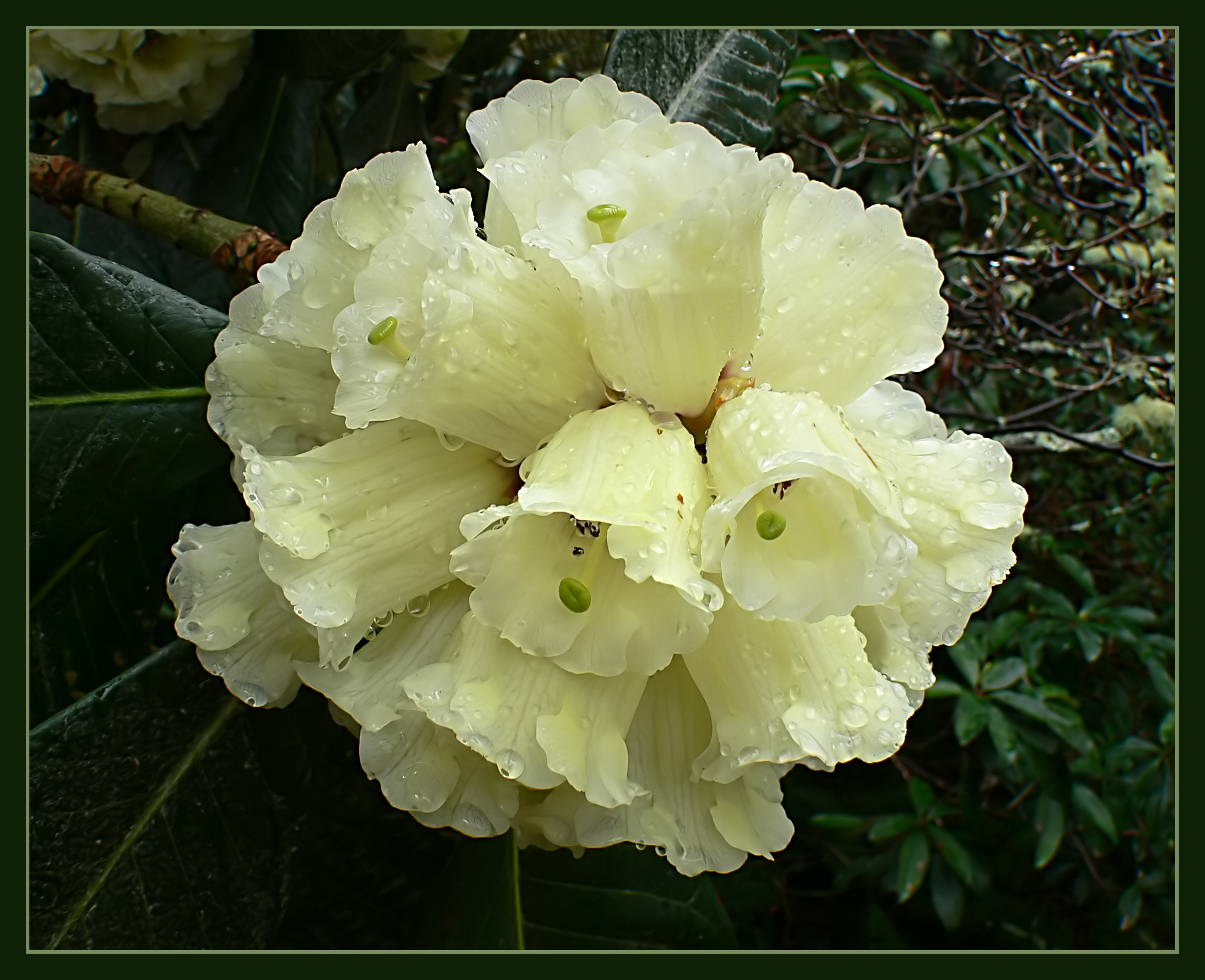

Scientific classification
- Kingdom: Plantae
- Clade: Tracheophytes
- Clade: Angiosperms
- Clade: Eudicots
- Clade: Asterids
- Order: Ericales
- Family: Ericaceae
- Genus: Rhododendron
- Species: R. macabeanum

Binomial name
- Rhododendron macabeanum G.Watt ex Balf.f.

= Rhododendron macabeanum =

Species of plant

Rhododendron macabeanum, the McCabe rhododendron, is a species of flowering plant in the heath family, Ericaceae. It is native to Assam and Manipur in northeastern India. It is a large evergreen shrub or small tree growing to 12 m (39 ft) in height, with leathery leaves up to 30 cm (12 in) in length. The felted undersides are a grey or buff colour. The flowers, borne in trusses in spring, are bell-shaped, pale to deep yellow, with a purple basal blotch.

In cultivation in the UK Rhododendron macabeanum has gained the Royal Horticultural Society's Award of Garden Merit. It is hardy down to −10 °C (14 °F) but requires a sheltered spot in dappled shade, and an acid soil enriched with leaf mould.

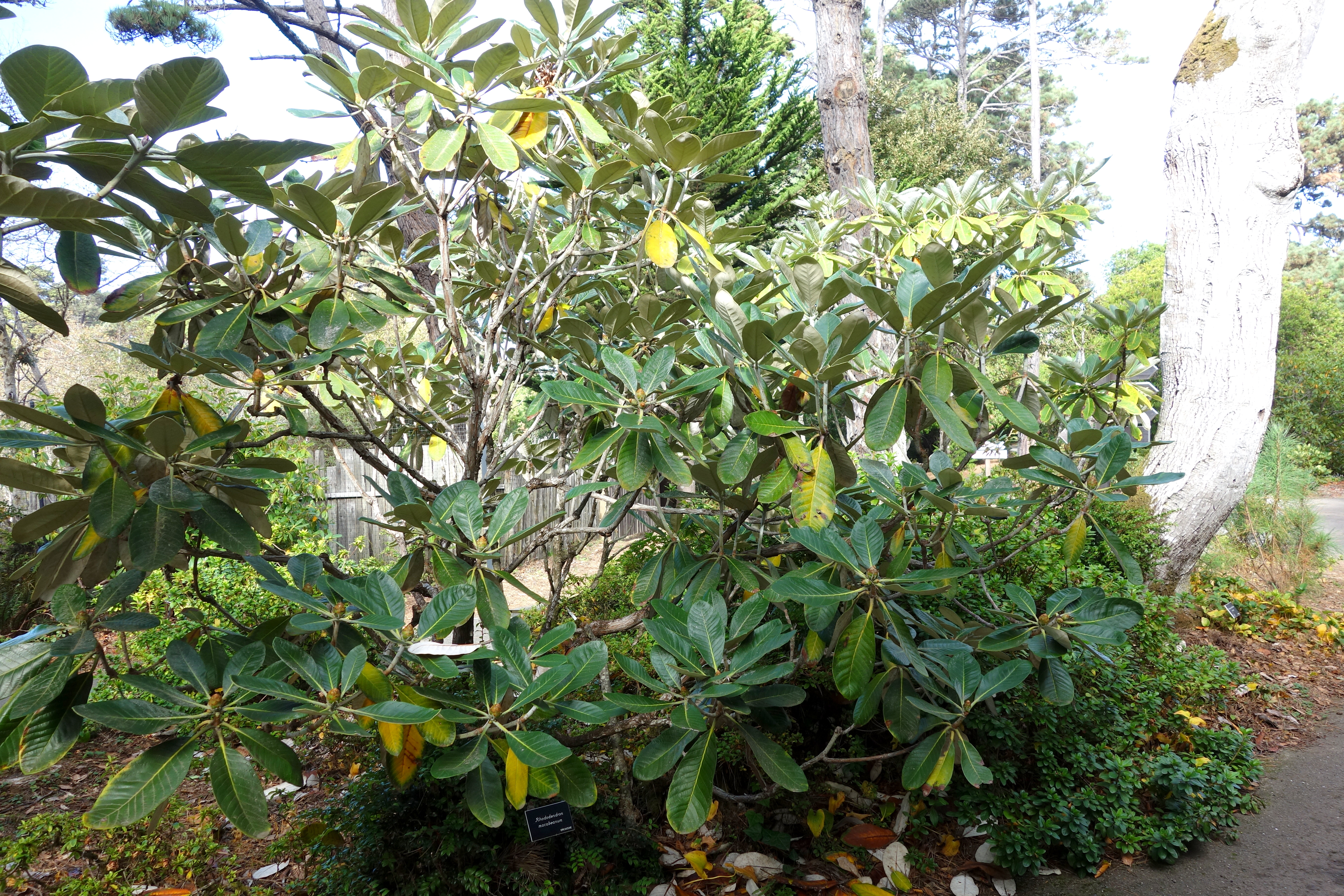
Mendocino Coast Botanical Gardens

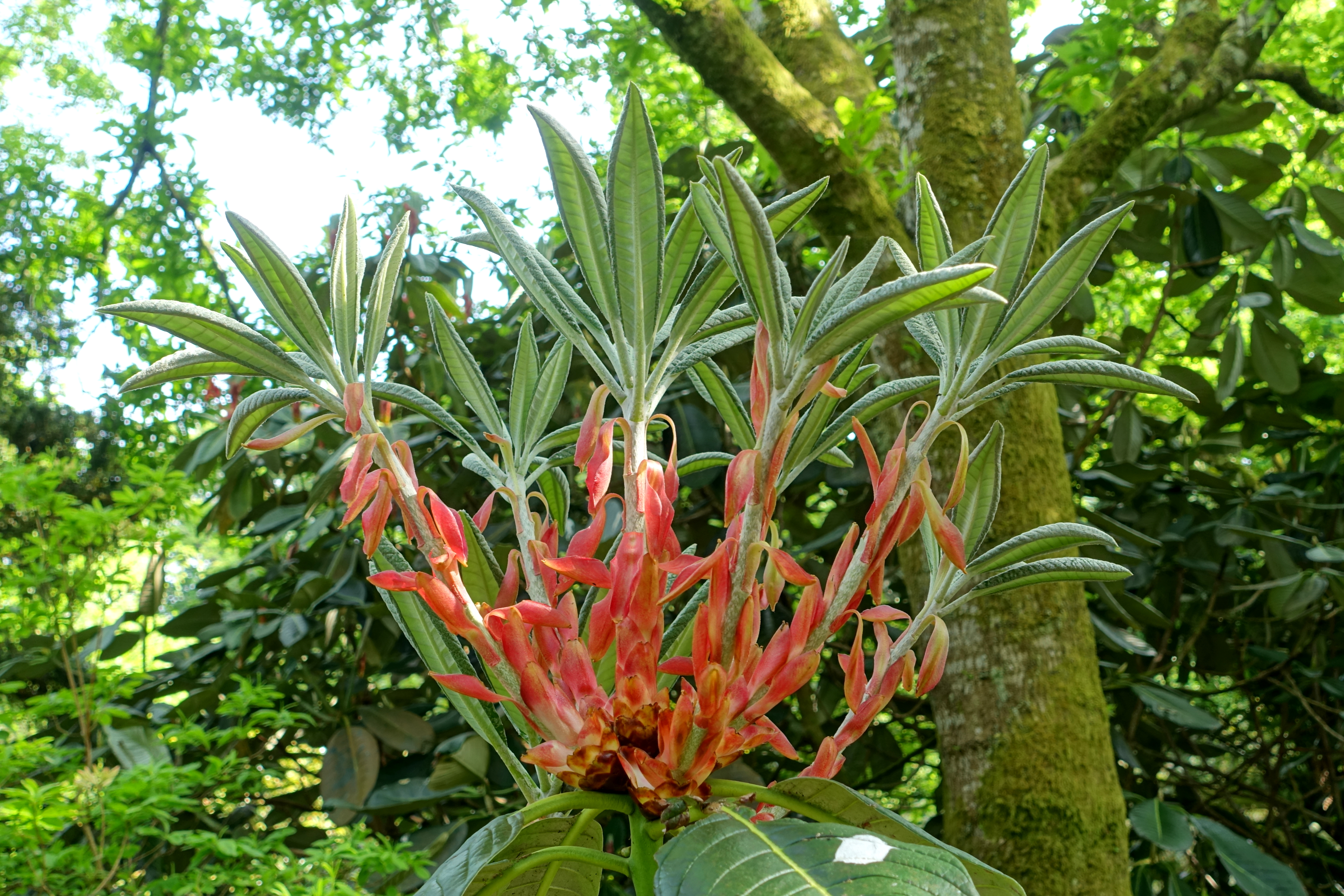
Hybrid in Trengwainton Gardens

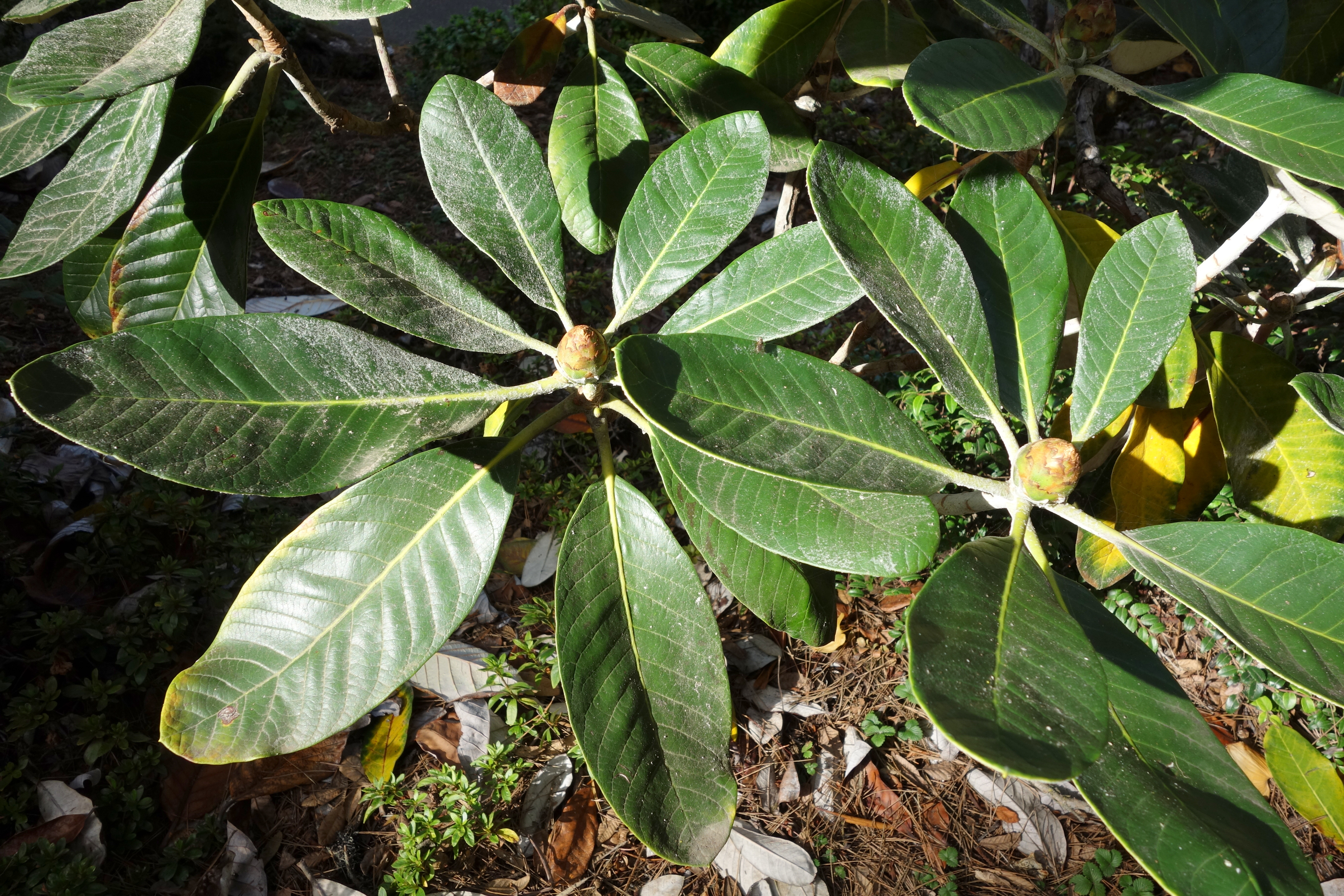
Mendocino Coast Botanical Gardens

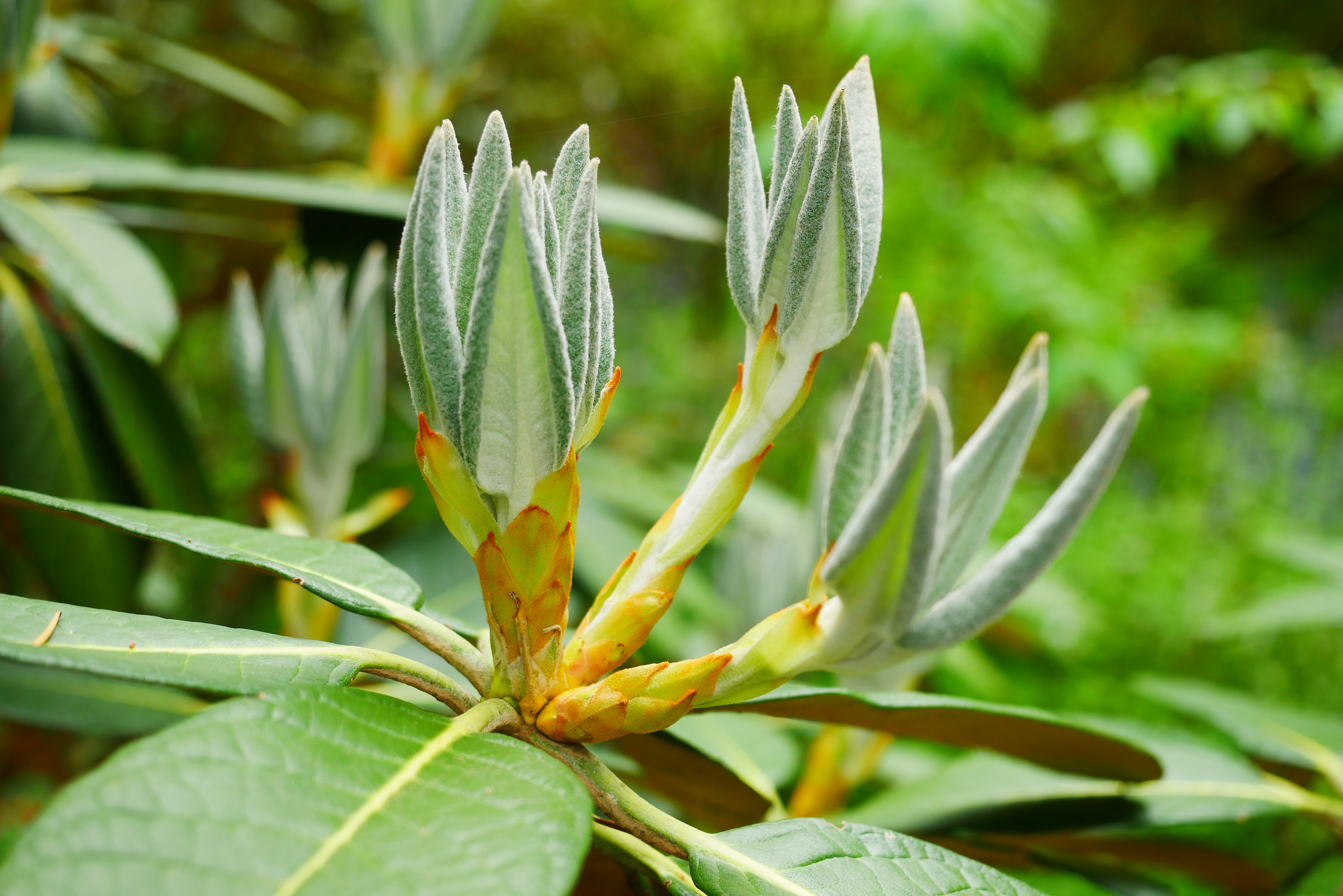
Alpine form

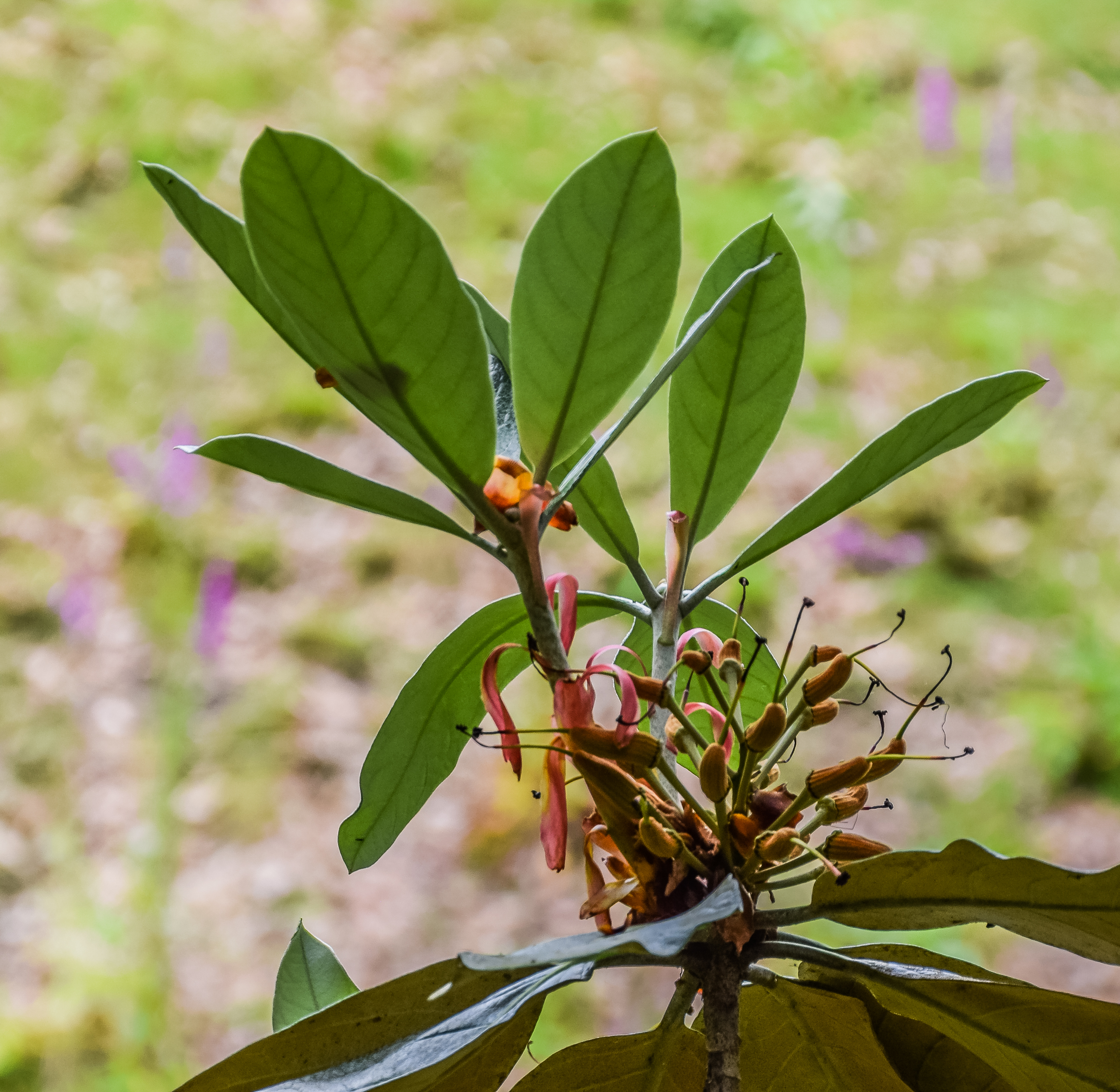
In Hackfalls Arboretum

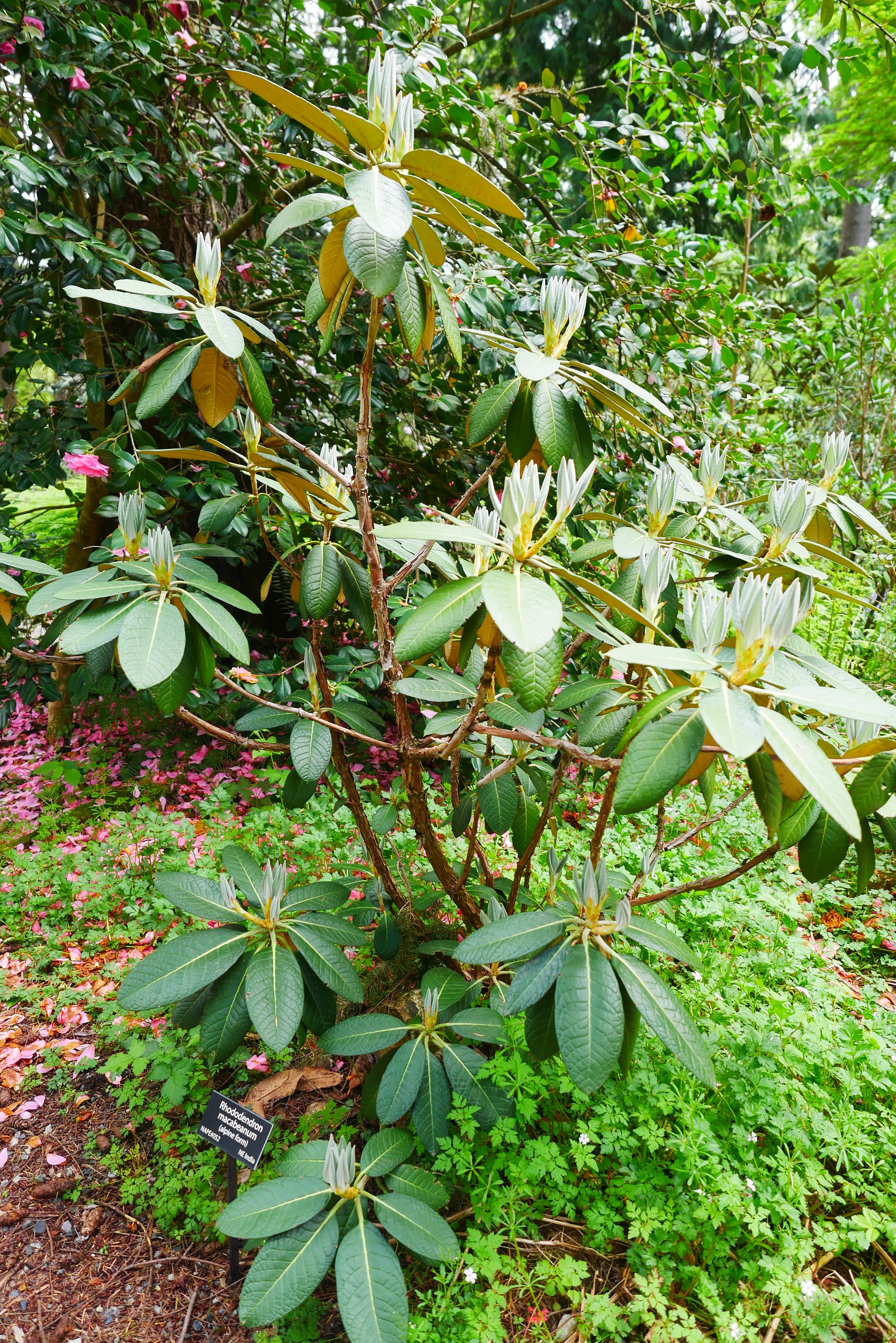
Alpine form
