= Kanny Lall Dey =

Physician and pharmacist from Bengal

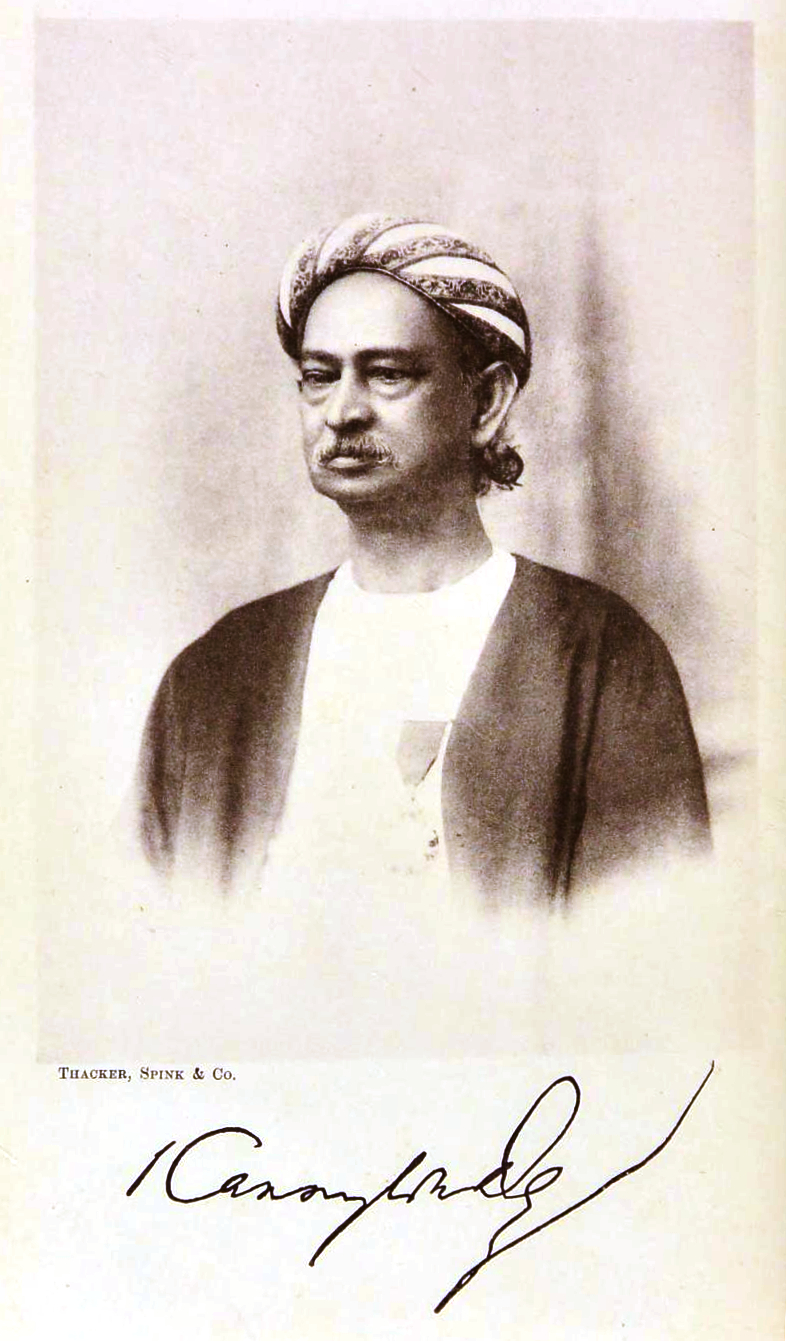

Kanny Lall Dey or Kanhai Lal De CIE (24 September 1831 – 16 August 1899) was a physician and pharmaceutical chemist from Bengal who wrote a major compilation of Indian medicinal plants and promoted the use of traditional medicines along with more modern approaches in treatments.

Dey was born in Calcutta where his father Rai Radhanath Dey was the Deputy Collector. As a young boy he took an interest in chemistry and went to study medicine at the Calcutta Medical College. After obtaining a diploma at the age of 22 he joined government service as a sub-assistant surgeon with the Bengal Medical Establishment. He also became an assistant to the professor of chemistry and acted as chemical examiner to the government. He held this position till 1869 while also teaching medical jurisprudence. In 1862 he became Professor of chemistry in the Presidency College, Calcutta and served as Chemical Examiner to Government in 1877 when Dr F. N. Macnamara was on furlough. At the International Exhibition of 1862 at London, Kanny Lall contributed a collection of medicinal oils and drugs and received two medals. He also contributed to the Great Exhibition of 1878 at Paris. He also contributed descriptions to the Pharmacopoeia of India. Wishing that Indian medical officers would gain a knowledge of India's Materia Medica, he set about preparing a text on the topic in 1877. At the Calcutta Exhibition of 1883-84, he was a judge for about fifteen sections.

Dey was titled Rai Bahadur in 1872 and recognized in 1863 by the Pharmaceutical Society of Great Britain and made an Honorary Member, a "distinction which is reserved ... for the world's fifty most eminent men of science related to pharmacy." In 1880 he was elected Fellow of the Chemical Society of London and the Society of Science, Letters and Arts of London. In 1886, he was a corresponding Fellow of the College of Physicians, Philadelphia. In 1881 he was invited to attend the International Pharmaceutical and Medical Congress at London but religious beliefs prevented him from boarding a ship. In 1884 he was invested as a Companion of the Most Eminent Order of the Indian Empire.

Kanny Lall Dey collaborated with Sir George Watt and Sir George King; and was along with them a member of the Indigenous Drugs Committee appointed by the Government of India.

== See also ==
List of physicians
