= Thomas Hanbury =

English businessman, gardener and philanthropist (1832–1907)

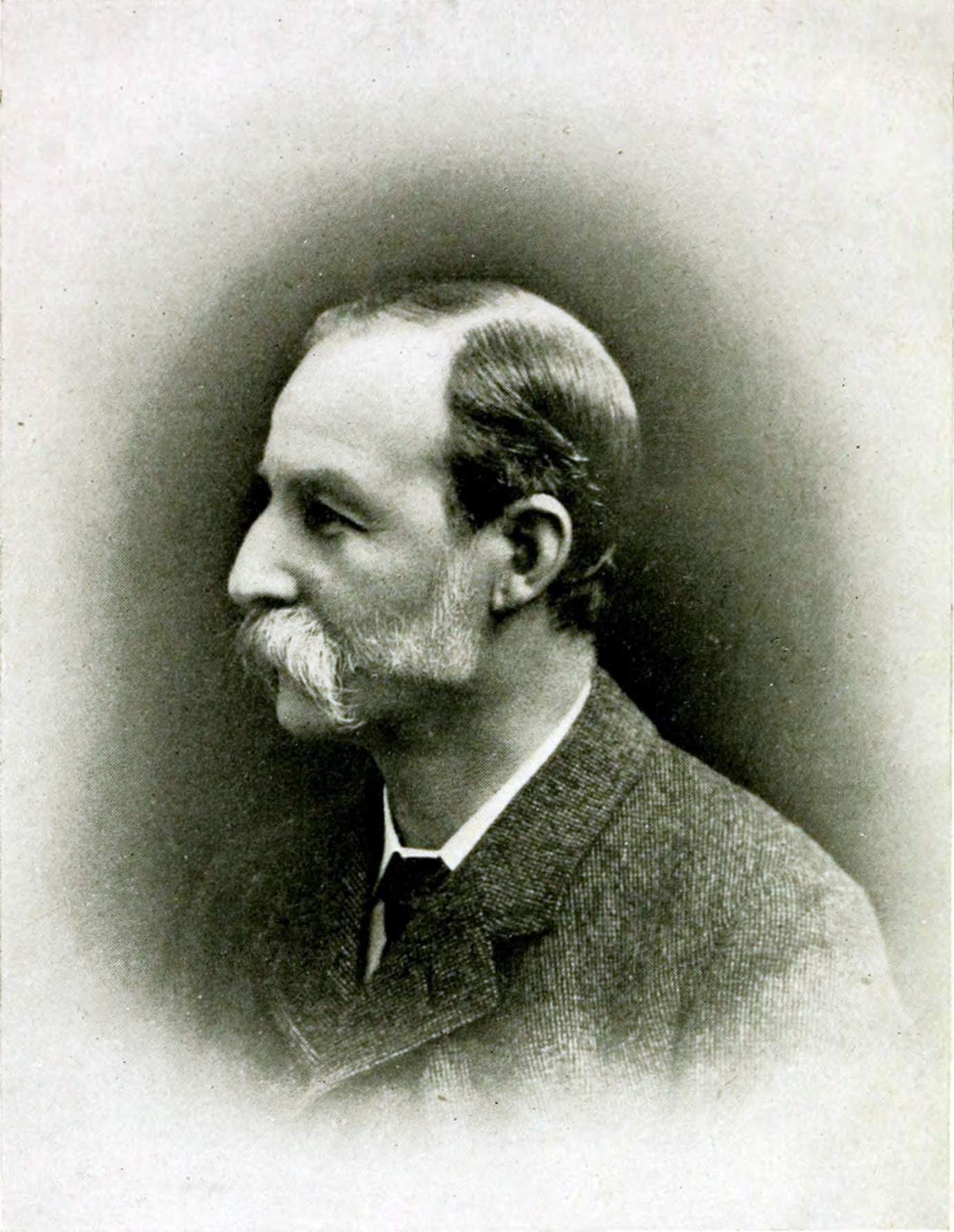
- Portrait of Thomas Hanbury from the 1912 edition of Hortus Mortolensis
- Born: 21 June 1832; London
- Died: 9 March 1907 (aged 74); La Mortola, Italy Riviera
- Resting place: La Mortola
- Occupations: Entrepreneur, philanthropist
- Known for: Giardini Botanici Hanbury, Ventimiglia

Sir Thomas Hanbury (21 June 1832 – 9 March 1907) was an English businessman, gardener and philanthropist. He built the Giardini Botanici Hanbury, or Hanbury botanical gardens, at Mortola Inferiore, between Ventimiglia and Menton, on the coast of Italy near to the border with France. Upon the death of George Fergusson Wilson in 1902, Hanbury purchased Oakwood, Wilson's experimental garden, and donated it to the Royal Horticultural Society as the basis of what would become RHS Garden Wisley.

== Early life ==
Thomas Hanbury was born on 21 June 1832 at Bedford Road, Clapham, Surrey. He was the fourth child and third son of a pharmaceutical chemist, Daniel Bell Hanbury (1794–1882), and his wife Rachel, née Christy, (c. 1802–1876). His eldest brother was the botanist and pharmacognosist Daniel Hanbury (1825–1875). The Hanburys were Quakers, and members of the family had been members of the Society of Friends since its beginnings in the seventeenth century. His great-aunt was the philanthropist and centenarian Elizabeth Hanbury. Thomas Hanbury was sent to predominantly Quaker schools, first in Croydon, and then in Epping. He remained a Friend all his life.

== China ==
From 1849 Hanbury worked for the tea brokers William James Thompson & Sons in Mincing Lane, London. In 1853 he travelled to Shanghai, which had opened to foreign commerce in 1843. With three partners and with the financial backing of his uncle, he started Hanbury & Co., merchants in silk and tea. The partnership dissolved in 1857, and Hanbury and Frederick Bower entered into a new one, Bower, Hanbury & Co., which diversified into currency trading and cotton broking. Hanbury became extremely wealthy, and was the largest holder of property in Shanghai.

Hanbury arrived in China at a time of widespread civil unrest. In 1854 there were five separate rebellions within the country: the Nien Rebellion, the Red Turban Rebellion (1854–1856), the Miao Rebellion, the Small Knife Society and the vast Taiping Rebellion (1850–64), which has been described as the "most gigantic man-made disaster" of the nineteenth century. The Taiping rebels had taken Shanghai in 1851, but lost it to Qing dynasty forces in January 1853. The Small Knife Society occupied old Shanghai and many surrounding villages from 1854 to February 1855.

The European residents of Shanghai lived in self-governing settlements or concessions outside the city walls, in physical and social isolation from the local population. Hanbury took the unusual step of learning Mandarin Chinese. He travelled within the country and was soon trusted and respected by local people. When he finally left Shanghai in 1871, his Chinese acquaintances and friends brought him so many parting gifts that he begged them to stop.

Hanbury was a member of the Anglo-American Municipal Council of Shanghai and helped set up a hospital and plant gardens in the concession. He was a director of the first railway line to be built in China, the short-lived Woosung Railway. The first telegraph message from Shanghai to Hong Kong was sent from his office.

Hanbury financed the Eurasia School in the 1880s and later renamed it the Hanbury Schools for Boys and Girls, which were precursors to Shanghai Shixi High School.

== La Mortola ==
Hanbury visited Europe between 1866 and 1869, and in 1867 travelled on the Côte d'Azur. He saw and purchased the abandoned villa of the Orengo di Roccasterone family at Mortola, where he planned to make a botanical garden with the help of his brother Daniel.

Hanbury married Katharine Aldam Pease (1842–1920) of Westbury-on-Trym, now a suburb of Bristol, in 1868. They travelled to China in 1869, where Hanbury wound up his business, and returned to live at La Mortola in 1871. The Orengo villa was restored, and Daniel had already begun planting the gardens, which eventually extended over 18 of the 45 hectares of the estate, and came to be known as the Giardini Botanici Hanbury. The couple had four children: Cecil, Horace, Daniel and Hilda.

=== The Giardini Botanici Hanbury ===
In December 1868 Hanbury employed as head gardener the botanist and garden designer Ludwig Winter, then 22 years old, who remained at La Mortola until 20 June 1875. From 1873 Hanbury also employed a curator of the gardens. The first of these was Gustave Rutschi, from 1873 to 1876. He was followed by Gustav Cronemeyer, compiler of the first published catalogue of 1889, and curator from 1883 to 1892. When Cronemeyer died in 1892, Kurt Dinter took over and remained until his departure for German South-West Africa in 1897. From then until the outbreak of the First World War in 1914, Alwin Berger was curator.

The gardens received many visitors. Among these was Queen Victoria, in 1882; others included her son Prince Arthur, Duke of Connaught with his wife Princess Louise Margaret of Prussia; his brother Prince Leopold, Duke of Albany; his sister Princess Beatrice; Princess Eugenie; King Albert of Saxony and Queen Carola; Prince Ernest of Saxe-Coburg; the then Prince of Naples; and Kuo Sung Tao, the first Qing dynasty minister to be accredited in Europe.

== Death ==
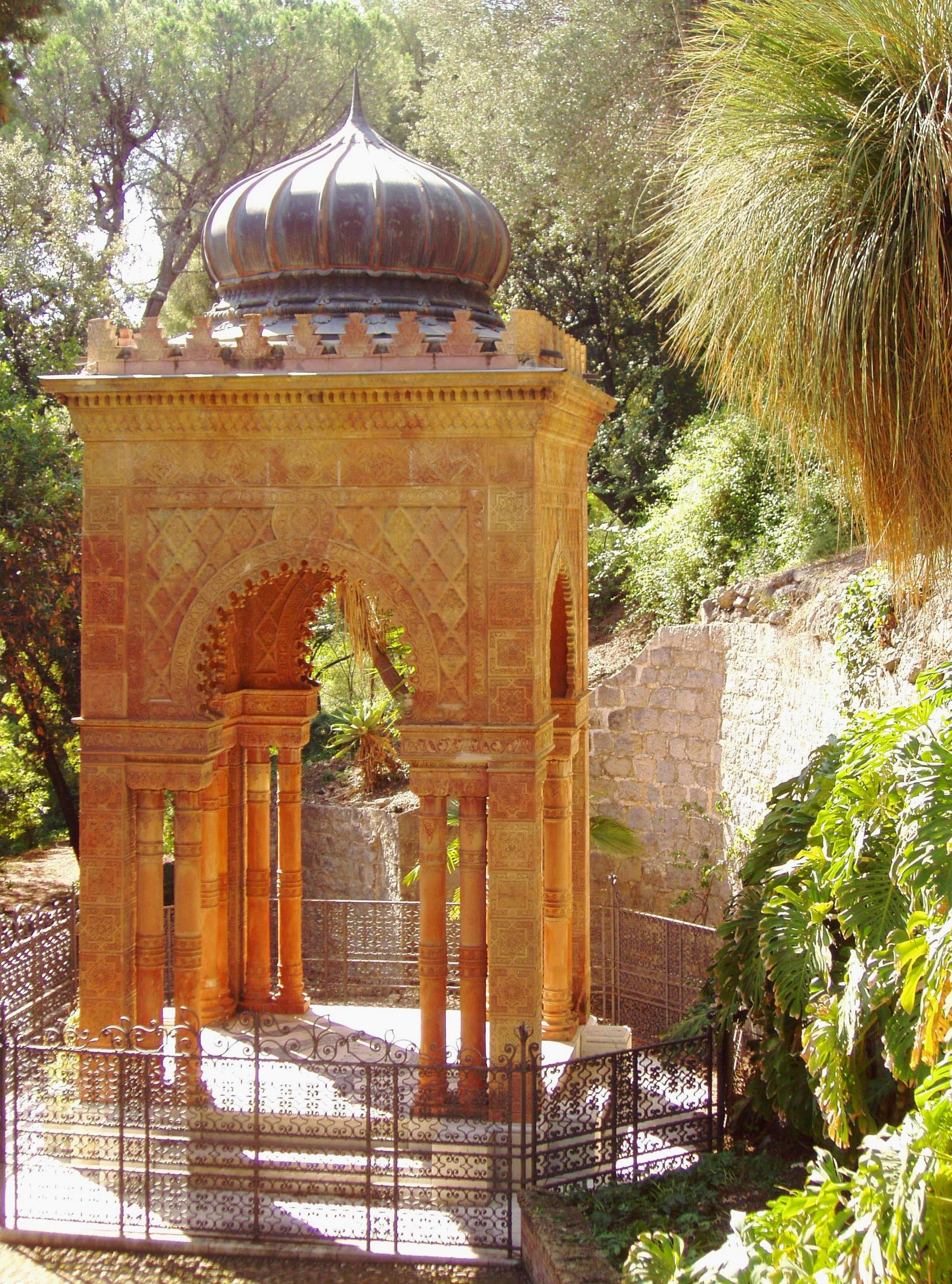
Mausoleum pavilion of the Hanburys in the gardens of Villa Orengo at La Mortola

Hanbury died at La Mortola on 9 March 1907. He was buried in the gardens under a pavilion in moresco style.
