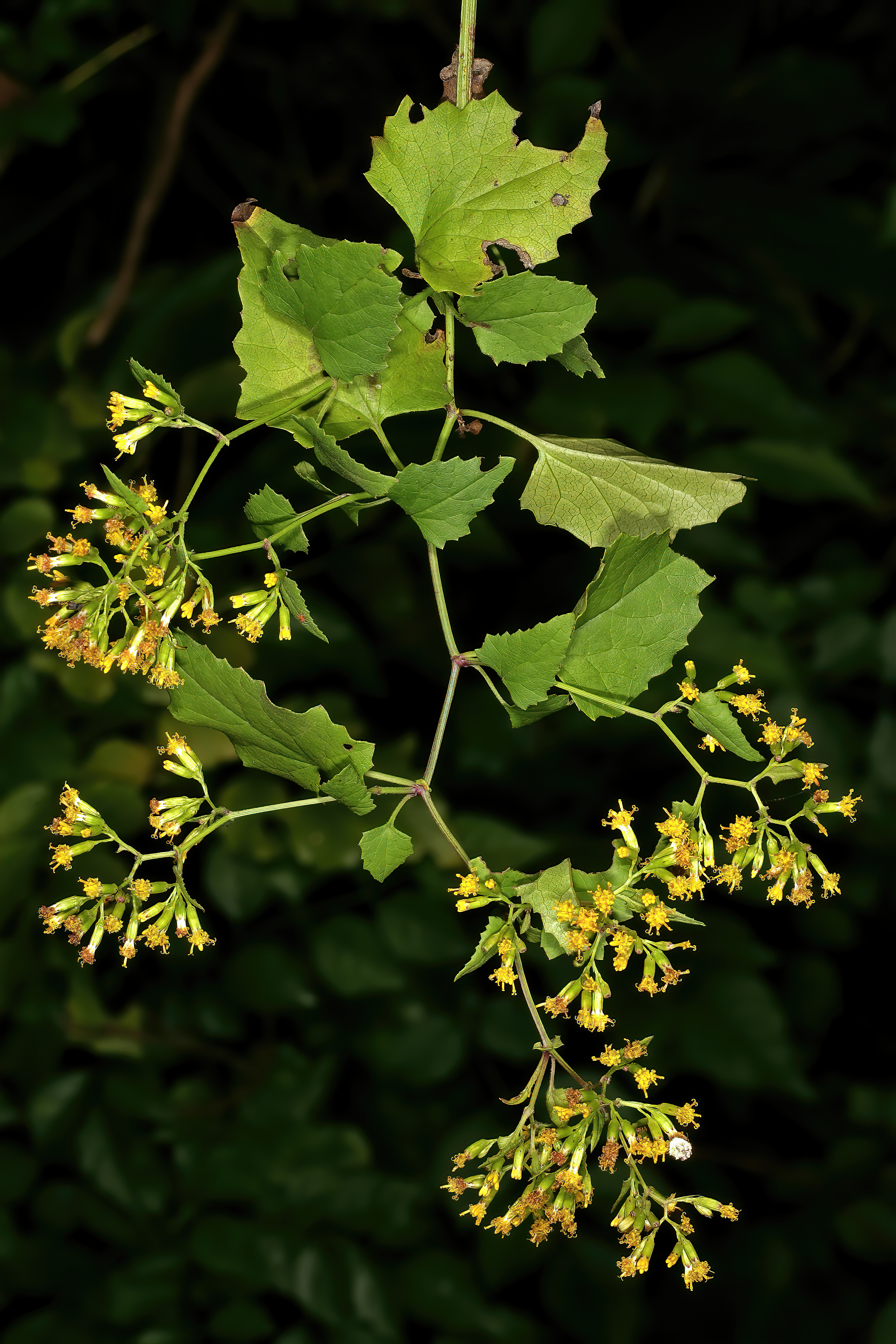

Scientific classification
- Kingdom: Plantae
- Clade: Tracheophytes
- Clade: Angiosperms
- Clade: Eudicots
- Clade: Asterids
- Order: Asterales
- Family: Asteraceae
- Genus: Senecio
- Species: S. deltoideus

Binomial name
- Senecio deltoideus Less.

= Senecio deltoideus =

Species of flowering plant

Senecio deltoideus, also known as Canary creeper or climbing ragwort, is a climbing herb native to Southern Africa and Eastern Africa. Its name "deltoideus" refers to the leaves being shaped like a triangle.

== Description ==
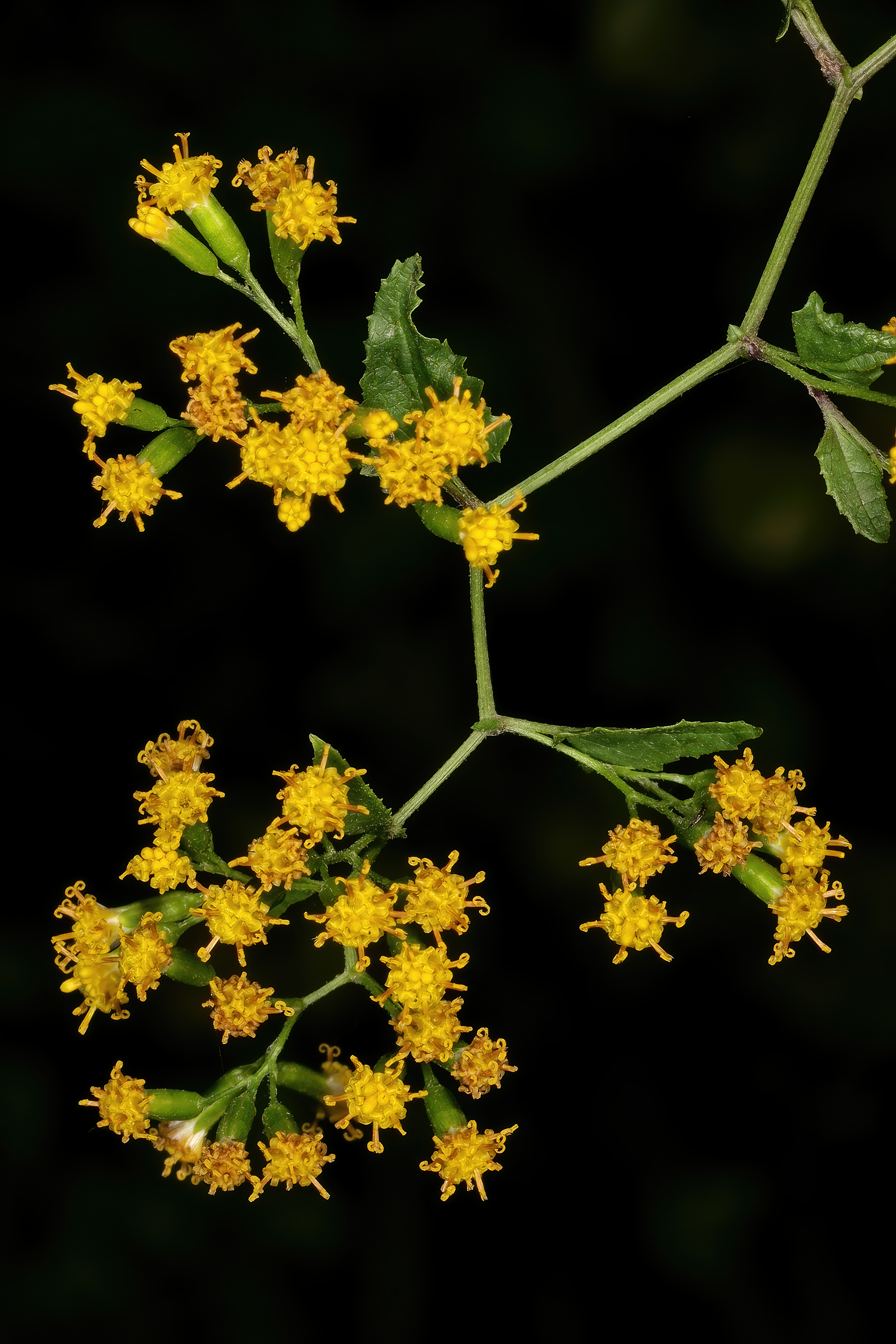
Discoid flowers

A slender climber, the plant forms clumps on the ground and in the underbrush of a scrubland, and is several feet long. Its leaves are dull green, serrated and broadly ovate, which become silvery and paler on the undersides. False, leaflike stipules occur at the bottom of the petioles. The capitula is bright yellow, that is produced in multitude of branched flowers.

== Habitat ==
Native to Kenya, Tanzania, Malawi, Mozambique, Zimbabwe, Eswatini and South Africa, the plant is generally found in rocky areas within montane grassland, ecotones between forest and grassland, ericoid scrub, riparian zones and along waysides in areas receiving high precipitation.

== See also ==
- Delairea odorata, related climber
