= Alwin Berger =

German botanist (1871-1931)

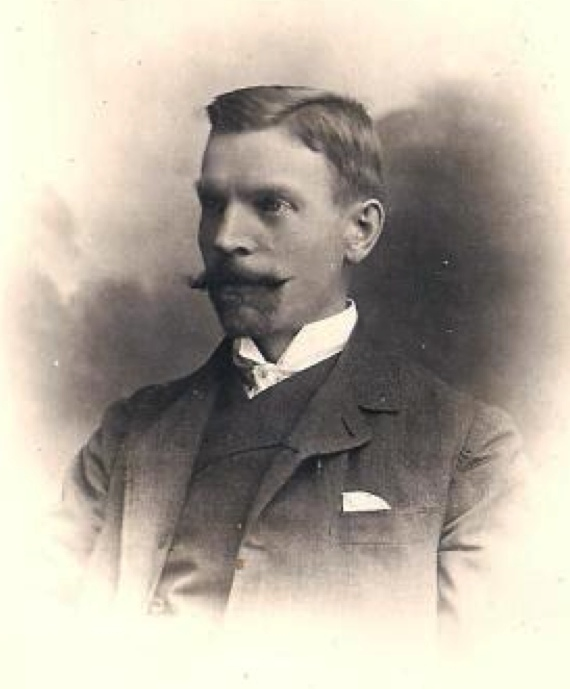
- Berger in 1906
- Born: 28 August 1871; Möschlitz, Schleiz, German Empire
- Died: 20 April 1931 (aged 59); Stuttgart, Germany
- Known for: Curator of Giardini Botanici Hanbury; Scientific classification Taxonomy
- Scientific career
- Fields: Botany
- Institutions: Giardini Botanici Hanbury
- Author abbrev. (botany): A.Berger

Alwin Berger (28 August 1871 – 20 April 1931) was a German botanist best known for his contribution to the nomenclature of succulent plants, particularly agaves and cacti. Born in Germany he worked at the botanical gardens in Dresden and Frankfurt. From 1897 to 1914, he was curator of the Giardini Botanici Hanbury, the botanical gardens of Sir Thomas Hanbury at La Mortola, near Ventimiglia in northwestern Italy, close to the border with France. After working in Germany from 1914 to 1919, Berger studied in the United States for three years, before spending his final years as director of the department of botany of the natural history museum in Stuttgart

His main work, Die Agaven, published in 1915, described 274 species of agave, divided into 3 subgenera, Littaea, Euagave and Manfreda. He also recognised a new genus of cactus, Roseocactus, in 1925.

The genera Bergerocactus (Cactaceae) and Bergeranthus (Mesembryanthemaceae) are named in his honour.

== Publications ==
The principal publications of Alwin Berger include:

- Systematische Übersicht der kultivierten Kleinien. Neudamm: Neumann, 1904/5.
- Florula Mortolensis. An enumeration of the plants growing wild at La Mortola. Ventimiglia: Billi, 1905.
- Proposed congratulatory address to Sir Thomas Hanbury ... of la Mortola, Ventimiglia : prepared for the celebration of his Seventy-fifth birthday, 21st June 1907. [S.l.]: [S.n.], 1907.
- Sukkulente Euphorbien. Beschreibung und Anleitung zum bestimmen der kultivierten Arten, mit kurzen Angaben über die Kultur. Stuttgart: Eugen Ulmer, 1907.
- Mesembrianthemen und Portulacaceen. Beschreibung und Anleitung zum Bestimmen der wichtigsten Arten, mit kurzen Angaben über die Kultur. Stuttgart: Eugen Ulmer, 1908.
- Liliaceae - Asphodeloideae - Aloineae : Mit 817 Einzelbildern in 141 Figuren und 1 Tafel. In: Adolf Engler, Das Pflanzenreich, regni vegetabilis conspectus IV 38 III. ii. Leipzig: Wilhelm Engelmann, 1908.
- Einige neue afrikanische Sukkulenten. Leipzig: W. Engelmann, 1910.
- Stapelieen und Kleinien, einschliesslich einiger anderer Verwandter Sukkulenten. Beschreibung und Anleitung zum bestimmen der wichtigen Arten mit kurzer Angabe über die Kultur. Stuttgart: Eugen Ulmer, 1910.
- Hortus Mortolensis : enumeratio plantarum in horto Mortolensi cultarum: Alphabetical catalogue of plants growing in the garden of the late Sir T. Hanbury at La Mortola, Ventimiglia, Italy. London: West, Newman, 1912.
- Die Agaven: Beiträge zu einer Monographie. Jena: Verlag von Gustav Fischer, 1915.
- A Taxonomic Review of Currants and Gooseberries. Genova; N.Y., 1924.
- Die Entwicklungslinien der Kakteen. Jena: Gustav Fischer, 1926.
- Eine neue Aristolochia aus Bolivien. Stuttgart: Württ. Naturaliensammlung, 1927.
- Kakteen, Anleitung zur Kultur und Kenntnis der wichtigsten eingeführten Arten. Stuttgart: Eugen Ulmer, 1929.
- Crassulaceae. Leipzig, 1930.
