= Mortola Inferiore =

- Frazione
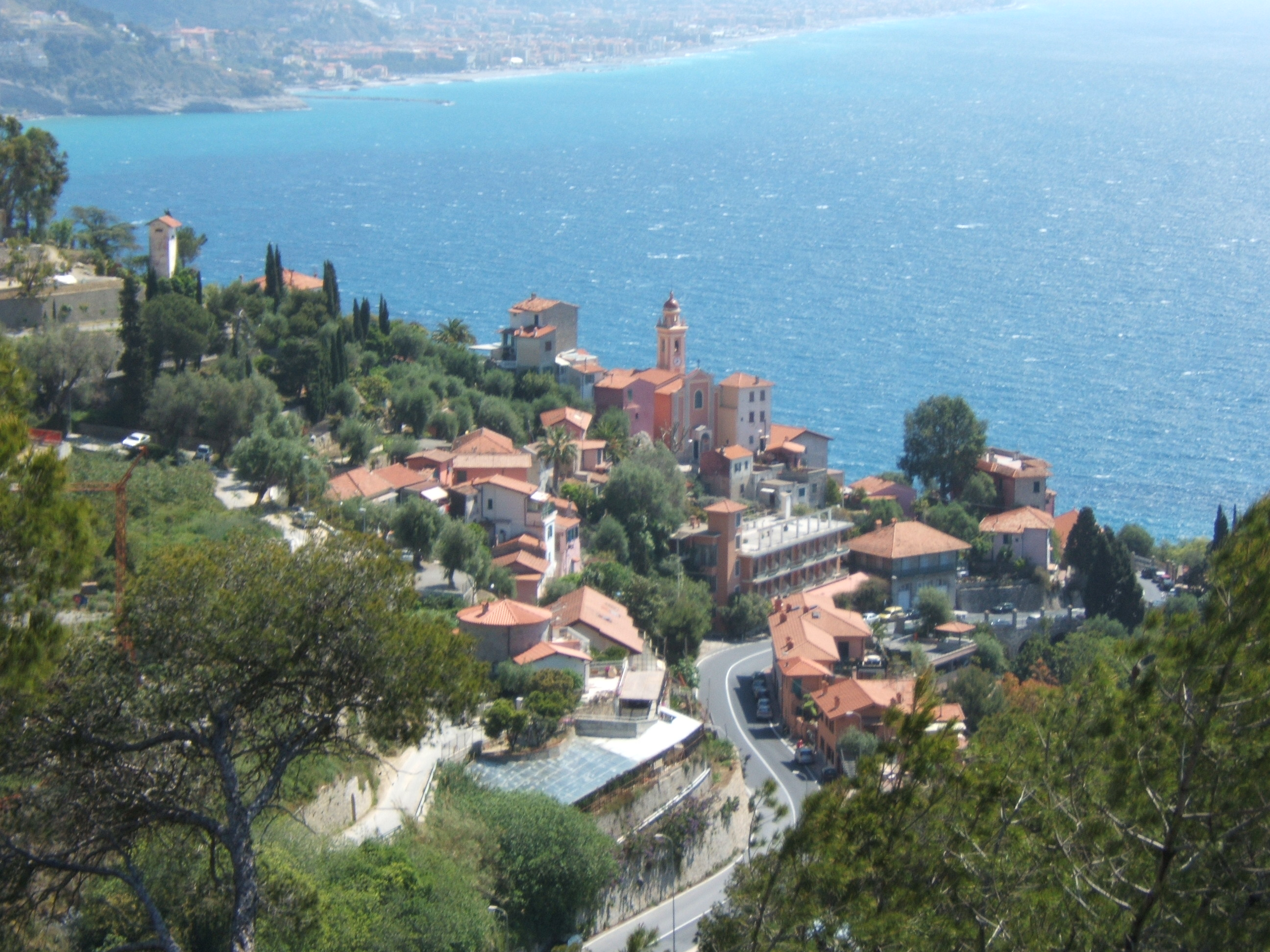

- Location of Mortola Inferiore in Italy
- Coordinates: 43.785°N 7.555°E
- Country: Italy
- Region: Liguria
- Province: Imperia
- Comune: Ventimiglia
- Time zone: UTC+1 (CET)
  - Summer (DST): UTC+2 (CEST)
- Postal code: 18039
- Dialing code: 0184

Mortola Inferiore, often known as La Mortola, is a frazione of the comune of Ventimiglia, in the province of Imperia, in Liguria, Italy. It lies on the road from Ventimiglia to the French border. It is home to the Giardini Botanici Hanbury, or Hanbury botanical gardens, created in the 19th century by Sir Thomas Hanbury.
