= Ouvrage L'Agaisen =

Museum in France

- Part of Maginot Line, Alpine Line
- Southeast France
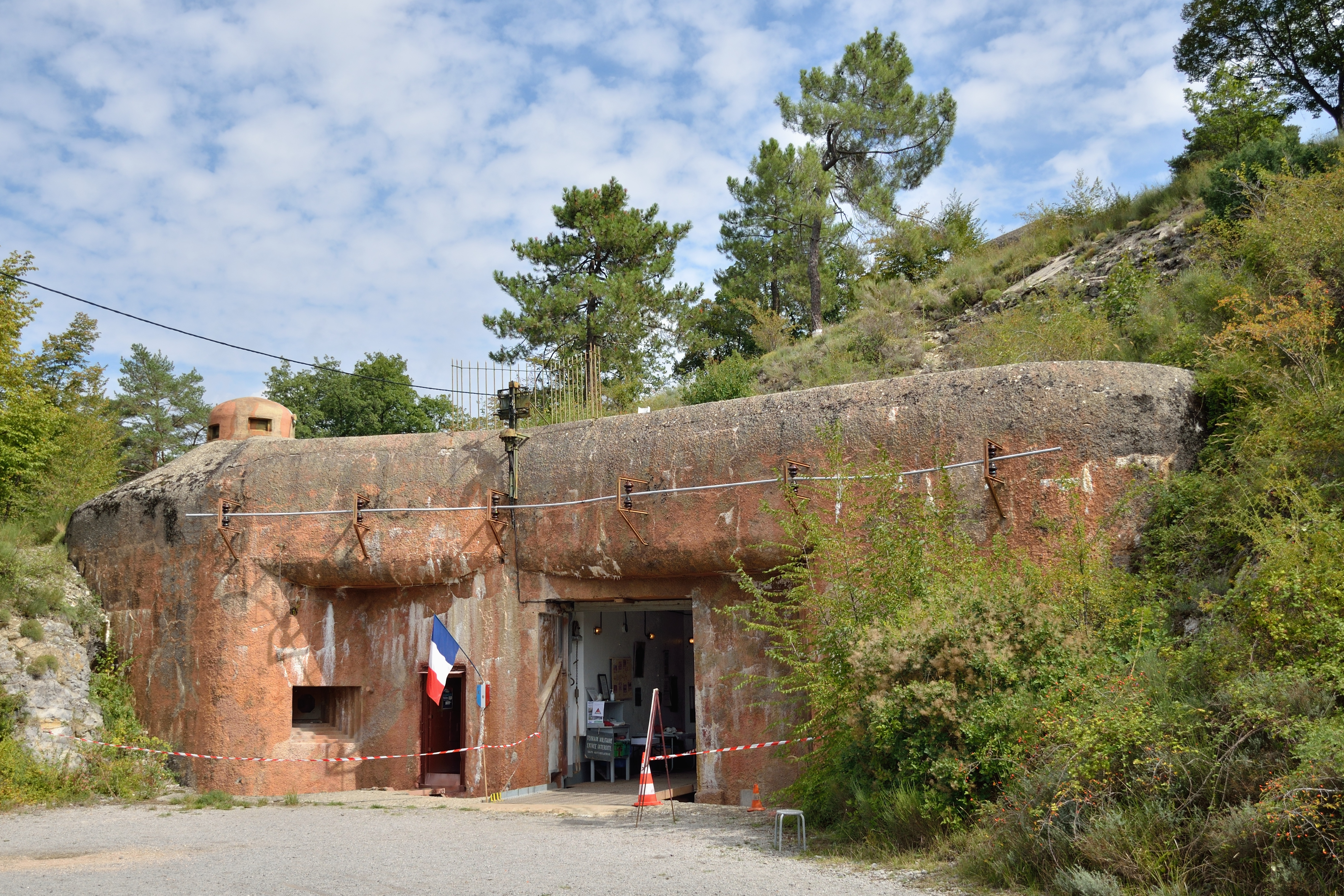

Site information
- Type: Gros Ouvrage
- Code: EO3
- Owner: Town of Sospel
- Controlled by: France
- Open to the public: Yes
- Condition: Preserved

Location
- Coordinates: 43.88697°N 7.45421°E

Site history
- Built: 1930-1935 (equipped 1935–1937)
- Built by: Marting, Roussel (under CORF oversight)
- In use: 1935-1991
- Materials: Concrete, steel, rock excavation
- Battles/wars: Italian invasion of France, Operation Dragoon

Garrison information
- Garrison: 95th BAF, 158th RAP
- Occupants: French Army

Monument historique
- Official name: Ouvrage de l'Agaisen EO III
- Type: Fortification
- Designated: 25 August 2016
- Reference no.: PA06000047

Ouvrage L'Agaisen is a work (gros ouvrage) of the Maginot Line's Alpine extension, the Alpine Line, also known as the Little Maginot Line. The ouvrage consists of one entry block, two artillery blocks and one observation block above Sospel. Additional blocks were planned but not built. The ouvrage was built at the top of Mount Agaisen, overlooking, at an altitude of 750 metres (2,460 ft), the Bévéra valley and Sospel from the north.

It saw significant action during the Italian invasion of France in June 1940 at the start of World War II. Its Block 3's 75 mm gun turret alone fired an 1821 rounds in 1940, playing a crucial role in repelling the Italian troops advance in the Nice region. After the occupation of the Free Zone in 1942, the site fell under Italian control, and later into German hands who turned it against the Allies following the Allied invasion of Southern France in August 1944. As the Germans retreated in October 1944, they sabotaged the installations to prevent their use by the advancing Allies. Nevertheless, American forces swiftly restored the position and used it against the retreating Germans in one of the final military operations associated with the Maginot Line.

The ouvrage was built between 1930 and 1935, and was equipped from 1935 to 1937. It has an unusual 75 mm gun turret in Block 3. L'Agaisen possesses an instruction casemate that was used to allow soldiers to practice attack and defense skills. The garrison numbered about 300 officers and men. The work was primarily garrisoned by troops from the 95th Bataillon Alpin de Forteresse (BAF) and the 158th Régiment d'Artillerie de Position (RAP).

Maintained in operational condition during the Cold War to be used for the training of engineering personnel of the French army, it has been maintained by a volunteer association since 1992 and is now open for visits. It has been listed as French national heritage site since 2016.

== Description ==
On November 6, 1926, the “Commission de défense des frontières” (CDF), chaired by General Adolphe Guillaumat released its comprehensive “Rapport sur l'organisation défensive des frontières” (Report on the Defensive Organization of France's Borders). This report laid out a broad strategy for securing all of France's borders, including the North, the Ardennes, the Jura, the Alps, and the Mediterranean. Specifically, for the Nice region, the report recommended blocking the coastline and valleys leading to Nice, with particular emphasis on fortifying Menton, Sospel, and the Vésubie and Tinée valleys. Each combat block was designed to be autonomous, with its own ammunition stores, rest room, command post, as well as its ventilation and air filtration system. On 19 March 1929, the French Minister of War approved the program of works to be built in the south-east of France and, in particular, in the Alpes-Maritimes. Ouvrage l'Agaisen was built between November 1930 and December 1934, beginning with a contractor named Marting and completed by Roussel. The construction cost was 24.6 million francs, of which 2.7 million francs were for the access road. Given that firing positions for enemy heavy artillery were rare in the mountains, the level of protection for large fortifications in the Alpine line were at level 3: the block slabs are 2.5 meters thick (enough to withstand two 300 mm shell impacts), exposed walls are 2.75 m, and other walls, foundations, and floors are one meter. For blocks armed with a turret, the slab's protection level was increased to a concrete thickness of 3.5 m (enough to withstand two 420 mm shell impacts). The interior of the exposed slabs and walls is also covered with 5 mm of sheet metal to protect personnel from concrete spalling. The underground galleries run parallel with the ridge connecting the three combat blocks, the barracks under the summit. Block 4, an observation block, is at the extreme east end of the ridge:

- Block 1 (entry): one machine gun cloche, one grenade launcher cloche and two machine gun embrasures equipped with Model 1924/1929D machine guns.
- Block 2 (artillery): one machine gun cloche, one grenade launcher cloche, one twin machine gun cloche, one twin machine gun embrasure, two 75 mm/31cal gun embrasures and two 81 mm mortar embrasures, firing to the southwest. It included an upper floor with two optical stations and a radio that allowed direct communications with the entry block of the Ouvrage Saint-Roch. Its 75 mm gun and 81 mm mortars covered St Roch and Ouvrage Castillon.
- Block 3 (artillery): one machine gun cloche, one twin machine gun cloche, one twin 75 mm/31cal retractable gun turret and one twin machine gun embrasure. The turret has a 360-degree field of fire from the summit.
- Block 4 (observation): one observation cloche, two machine gun embrasures. It is located almost 200 m (660 ft) from the combat blocks.

A fifth block with four 81 mm mortars was never built. Three observation posts were associated with l'Agaisen, including the petit ouvrage Champ de Tir de l'Agaisen.

== History ==
The strong points of the Alpine Line and the French and Italian dispositions, prior to the Italian invasion of France, 10 June 1940. L'Ouvrage Agaisen is numered 21 in the Fortified Sector of the Maritime Alps.

During the Italian invasion of France in June 1940 the 75 mm turret fired more than 1800 shots in support of French forces. The heavy machine gun cloche in Block 2 fired on Italian forces in the area of the advanced post at Castes Ruines located on the opposite bank of the Bévera river in Sospel. The ouvrage took fire from Italian 305 mm artillery without significant damage. A crater caused by an Italian bomb existed until the 1990s.

Some of the fort's armament was removed under the terms of the Armistice of 22 June 1940, but the ouvrage was maintained by French forces through the war, albeit in a militarily decommissioned capacity. L'Agaisen was occupied by German forces after their withdrawal from the war in 1943, remaining until the allied invasion of Southern France in 1944. The Germans fired on the advancing 517th Parachute Infantry Regiment with the 75 mm turret in October, abandoning the position on October 28, 1944, after sabotaging some of the equipment. The American 442nd Infantry Regiment, composed of mostly Japanese-American soldiers, occupied the site in November 1944. During the Battle of Authion in April 1945 the 75 mm turrets of l'Agaisen and Monte Grosso were used in support of American and French forces in the area. An abundance of French 75 mm ammunition, incompatible with American 76 mm guns, encouraged the reconditioning and used of the turret guns. Agaisen’s 75 mm turrets were the only turrets of the Maginot line used by the French (1940), the Germans (1944) and the Allies (1945) for combat operations during the war.

After the war l'Agaisen was reconditioned using equipment from Barbonnet and Castillon. Equipment was upgraded through the 1950s and new mortars were delivered in 1962. Through the 1980s the position was kept under care of the French Army with a view to preservation and was decommissioned in 1991. In 1992 the Groupe Technique Agaisen (GTA) was formed to collaborate on preservation and restoration. L'Agaisen was transferred to the ownership of the town of Sospel in 2007.

L'Agaisen may be visited during open monument days or by prior arrangement for group visits.

== See also ==
- List of Alpine Line ouvrages

== Bibliography ==
- Allcorn, William (2003). The Maginot Line 1928–45. Oxford: Osprey Publishing. ISBN 1-84176-646-1.
- Garraud, Philippe (2007). "La politique de fortification des frontières de 1925 à 1940 : logiques, contraintes et usages de la « Ligne Maginot »". Guerres Mondiales et Conflits Contemporains (in French). 226 (2): 3–22. doi:10.3917/gmcc.226.0003. ISSN 0984-2292.
- Garraud, Philippe (2015-09-29). "La construction de la ligne Maginot alpine et son emploi en 1940 : un système défensif novateur et efficace". Guerres Mondiales et Conflits Contemporains (in French). 259 (3): 93–114. doi:10.3917/gmcc.259.0093. ISSN 0984-2292.
- Kaufmann, J.E.; Kaufmann, H.W. (2006). Fortress France: The Maginot Line and French Defenses in World War II. Stackpole Books. ISBN 0-275-98345-5.
- Kaufmann, J.E.; Kaufmann, H.W.; Jancovič-Potočnik, A.; Lang, P. (2011). The Maginot Line: History and Guide. Pen and Sword. ISBN 978-1-84884-068-3.
- Klingbeil, Pierre-Emmanuel (2005). Le front oublié des Alpes-Maritimes (15 août 1944 – 2 mai 1945) (in French). SERRE EDITEUR. ISBN 978-2-86410-422-3.
- Mary, Jean-Yves; Hohnadel, Alain; Sicard, Jacques (2001). Hommes et Ouvrages de la Ligne Maginot, Tome 1 (in French). Paris: Histoire & Collections. ISBN 2-908182-88-2.
- Mary, Jean-Yves; Hohnadel, Alain; Sicard, Jacques (2001b). Hommes et ouvrages de la ligne Maginot, Tome 2 : Les formes techniques de la fortification Nord-Est (in French). Paris: Histoire & Collections. ISBN 2-908182-97-1.
- Mary, Jean-Yves; Hohnadel, Alain; Sicard, Jacques (2009). Hommes et Ouvrages de la Ligne Maginot, Tome 4 – La fortification alpine (in French). Paris: Histoire & Collections. ISBN 978-2-915239-46-1.
- Mary, Jean-Yves; Hohnadel, Alain; Sicard, Jacques (2009b). Hommes et Ouvrages de la Ligne Maginot, Tome 5 (in French). Paris: Histoire & Collections. ISBN 978-2-35250-127-5.
- Cima, Bernard; Cima, Raymond (1994). Ouvrage de l'Agaisen. En suivant le guide (in French). Menton: B. et R. Cima. ISBN 978-2-9508505-0-8.
- Aime, Jean-Christian (2024). Ouvrage du Mont-Agaisen: de la conception à la sauvegarde (in French). Nice: Association EO3-Agaisen. ISBN 978-2-9595391-0-7.
