= Grimaldi (Ventimiglia) =

- Frazione
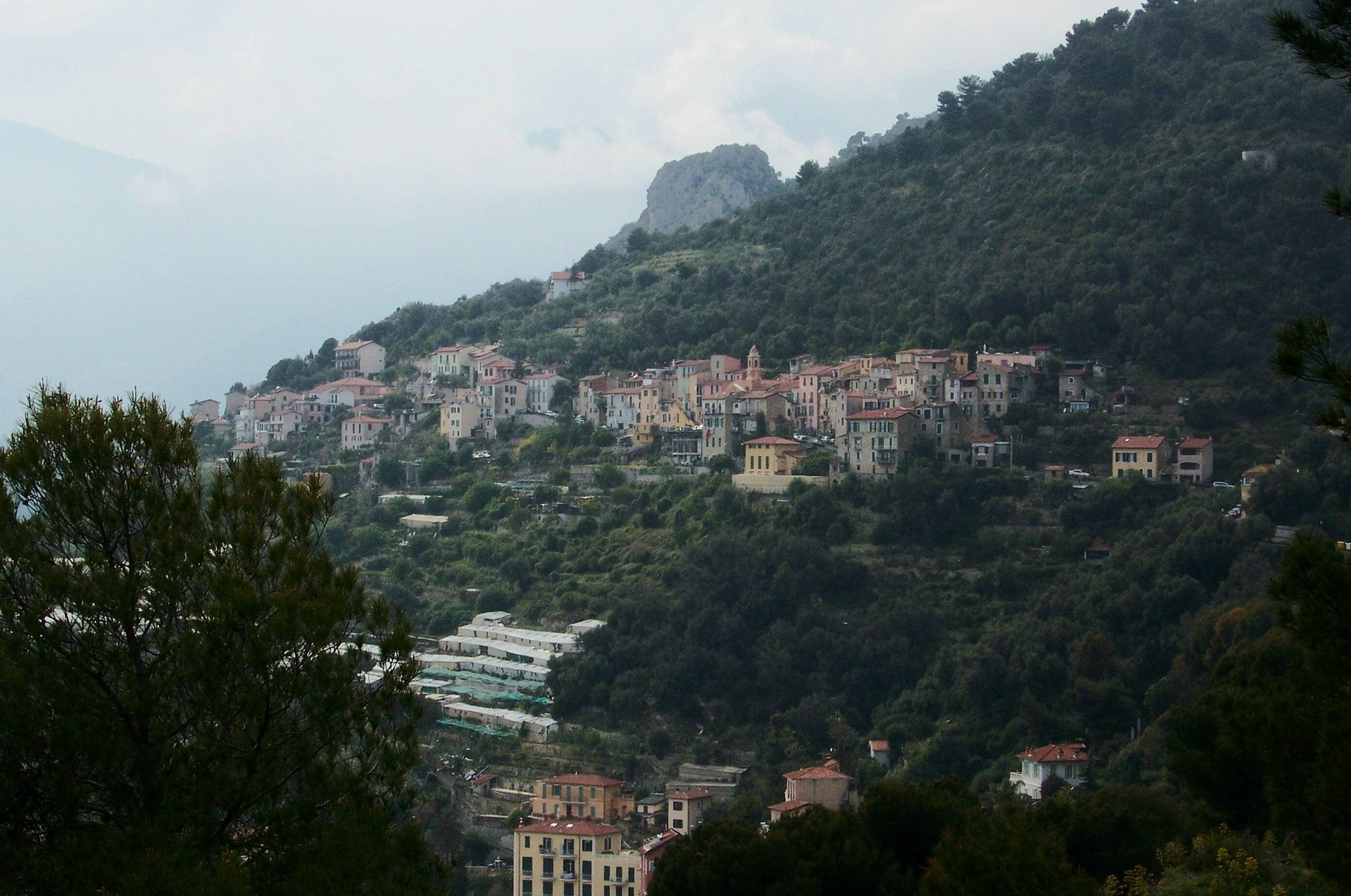

- Location of Grimaldi in Italy
- Coordinates: 43°47′13″N 7°32′20″E
- Country: Italy
- Region: Liguria
- Province: Imperia (IM)
- Comune: Ventimiglia
- Elevation: 220 m (720 ft)

Population (2021)
  - Total: 281
- Demonym: grimaldini
- Time zone: UTC+1 (CET)
  - Summer (DST): UTC+2 (CEST)
- Postal code: 18039
- Dialing code: 0184
- Saint day: 1 October

Grimaldi is a frazione of 281 inhabitants in the municipality of Ventimiglia, in the province of Imperia. It is located near the French border of Ponte San Luigi. The oldest inhabited centre, located at 220 m, takes the name of Grimaldi Superiore, to distinguish it from the houses built along the State Road 1 (SS1) Aurelia, which makes up Grimaldi Inferiore.

== Etymology ==
The origin of the toponym Grimaldi would derive from the Prince of Monaco Charles I who, during 1351, purchased these lands between the Vallone della Mortola and Garavan (Menton) and the top of the hill. Over the centuries the area changed its name several times: from "Grimalde" (quoted in 1514) to "Grimaude" (1655), and again "Grimardi" in 1760 until the current version of "Grimaldi".

== History ==
James Henry Bennett was an English doctor who helped popularize the French Riviera as a Winter holiday destination in the 19th century with his 1861 book Winter and Spring on the Shores of the Mediterranean.

"In 1865 I bought in Grimaldi, in Italy, some terraces planted with lemon and olive trees, some bare rocks and an old ruined tower. All this is located a hundred meters above sea level, on the rocky slope overlooking the road to Genoa, a short distance from the border of Ponte San Luigi. The terrain, facing south-west, is protected from the north winds and offers perhaps the most beautiful view possible of the [sic] amphitheater of Menton".

He will immediately get to work and create the first acclimatization garden on the Riviera preceding the Hanburys.

On 7 December 1944, a German patrol of the 34th Infantry Division (Wehrmacht), led by a local spy, broke into the "Vittoria" hotel and captured three families who had found shelter there. The twelve prisoners were then taken out of the hotel and shot.

Historically Grimaldi followed the events of Ventimiglia.

== Main sights ==
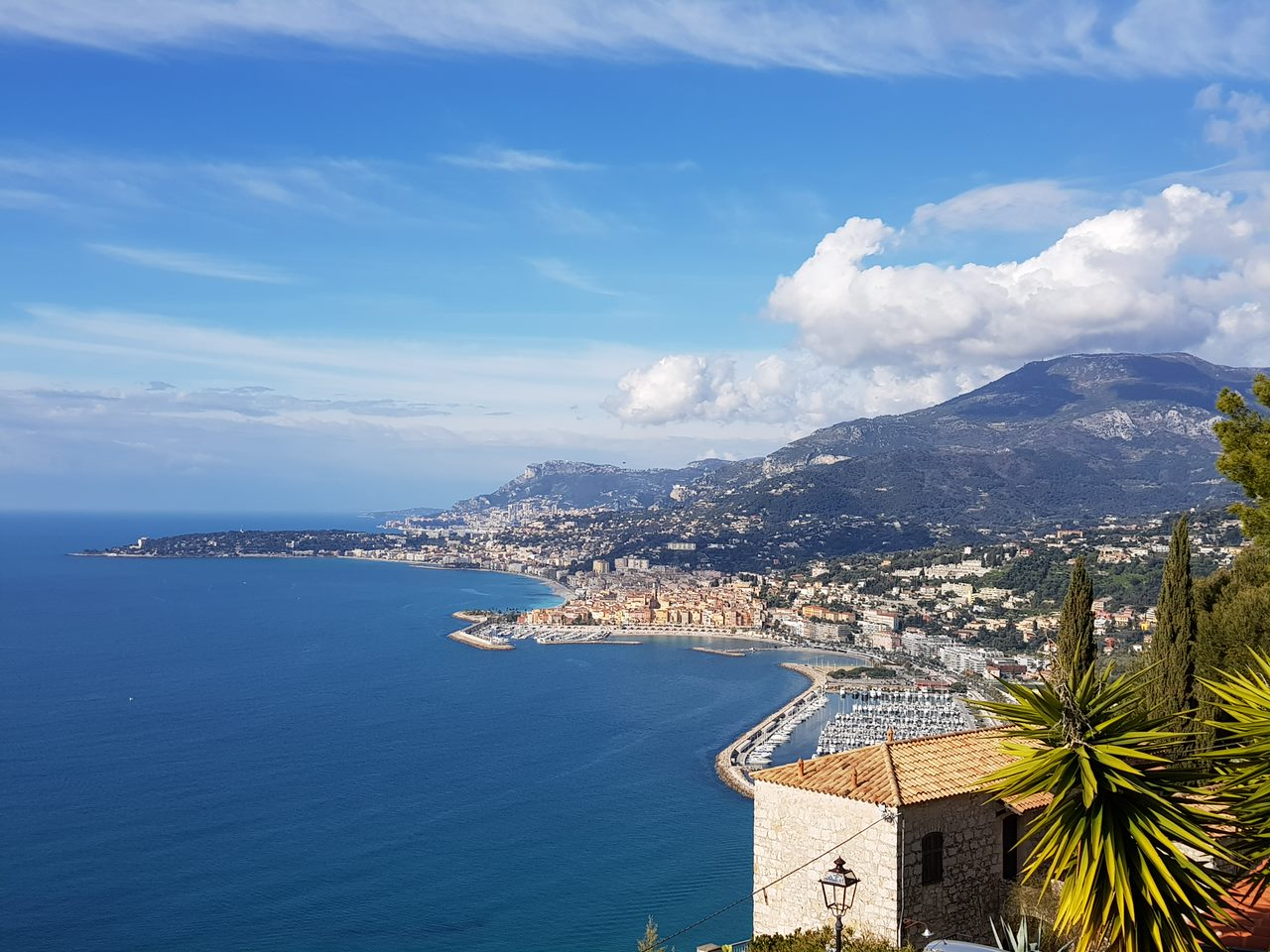
View of Menton and French Riviera from Grimaldi

Due to its position and height, Grimaldi has views of Menton, the Principality of Monaco and the French Riviera. During clear weather, the full coast of France, Tuscany and the island of Corsica are visible.

The caves of the Balzi Rossi have proved rich in palaeolithic remains of the Quaternary period. Remains of a family of Cro-Magnon people were discovered, with several skeletons of men, women and children.

The Giardini Botanici Hanbury (Hanbury Botanical Gardens), surrounding the villa of Sir Thomas Hanbury, La Mortola, are the biggest in Italy, with a number of varieties of tropical and sub-tropical species that thrive in this mild climate.

== Monuments and places of interest ==
=== Religious architectures ===
The local parish church, located in the historic centre, is dedicated to the Guardian Angels; the parish was established in 1947.

=== Civil architectures ===
The Voronoff castle is located in corso Mentone 50 in the hamlet of Grimaldi Inferiore. It owes its notoriety to the French surgeon and researcher of Russian extraction Serge Voronoff

=== Military architectures ===
The Grimaldi tower (also known as the Dogana tower, the Saracen tower and the Corsi tower).

=== Natural areas ===
In the nearby locality of the Balzi Rossi, in the so-called "Grotta dei Fanciulli", there have been Cro-Magnon finds.

In Grimaldi and its surroundings there are protected areas of particular naturalistic value: the southern part, along the last stretch of State Road SS1 Aurelia, in the hamlet of Mortola Inferiore, falls in part in the SCI (Site of Community Importance) IT 1316118 of Capo Mortola, while the paths north of the built-up area of the hamlet of Grimaldi Superiore falls within the SCI IT 1315717 of Monte Grammondo and the Bevera torrent.

The site of Capo Mortola is represented by a strip of coast in which the natural vegetation has a "relict" character within a notably man-made territory, but which preserves the Hanbury Botanical Garden, a botanical garden of international importance.

The site of Monte Grammondo and the Bevera torrent is a landscape of interest for the presence of significant forms of superficial karst erosion. In general, it is an area of geologic tension between the Mediterranean and Alpine domains, with a presence of endemics. There are habitats of interest, which include the blooming of orchids. There are also the presence of disjoint stations of Paeonia officinalis and Acis nicaeensis, rare species, proposed by the Liguria Region for inclusion in Annex II of Directive 92/43 CEE. There are also several species protected by international directives / conventions. The presence of Ocellated lizard (Timon lepidus), a very rare species in Italy and having its eastern limit in Liguria, for which the conferment of priority species has been proposed (for the Italian populations only). Of interest in Liguria of this type of environment, is the river area known as the "meanders of the Bevera".

Between the villages of Grimaldi and the French town of Garavan (Menton) there is a path called Passo della Morte (Pass of Death), travelled since the nineteenth century by those who want to go to France without having documents in order.

== See also ==
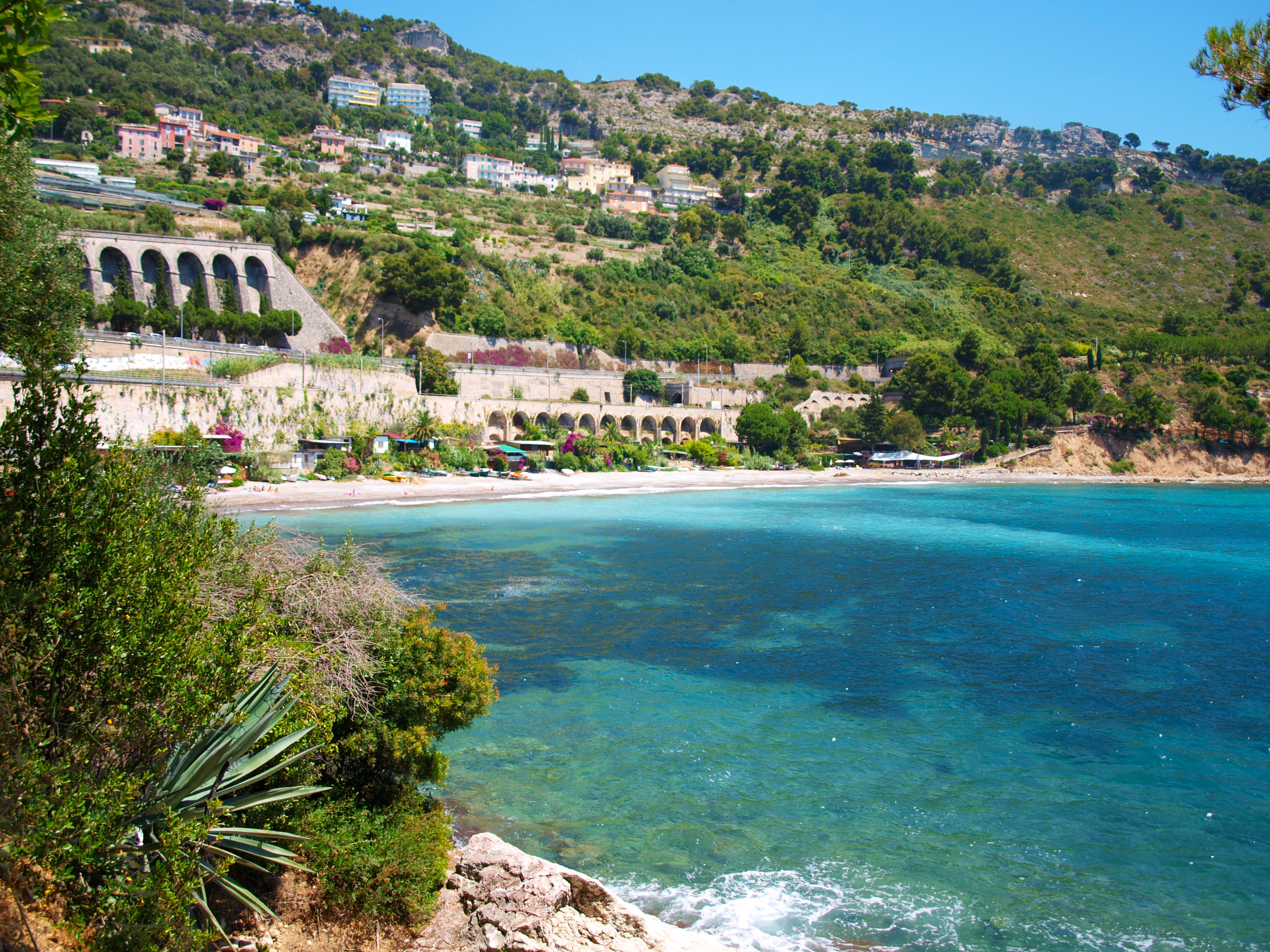
Darsanun, beach near Grimaldi Inferiore

- Liguria
- Province of Imperia
- Ventimiglia
- Balzi Rossi caves
- Hanbury Botanical Garden
- House of Grimaldi
