= Old Sospel Bridge =

Bridge in Sospel, France

Old Sospel Bridge Vieux Pont de Sospel
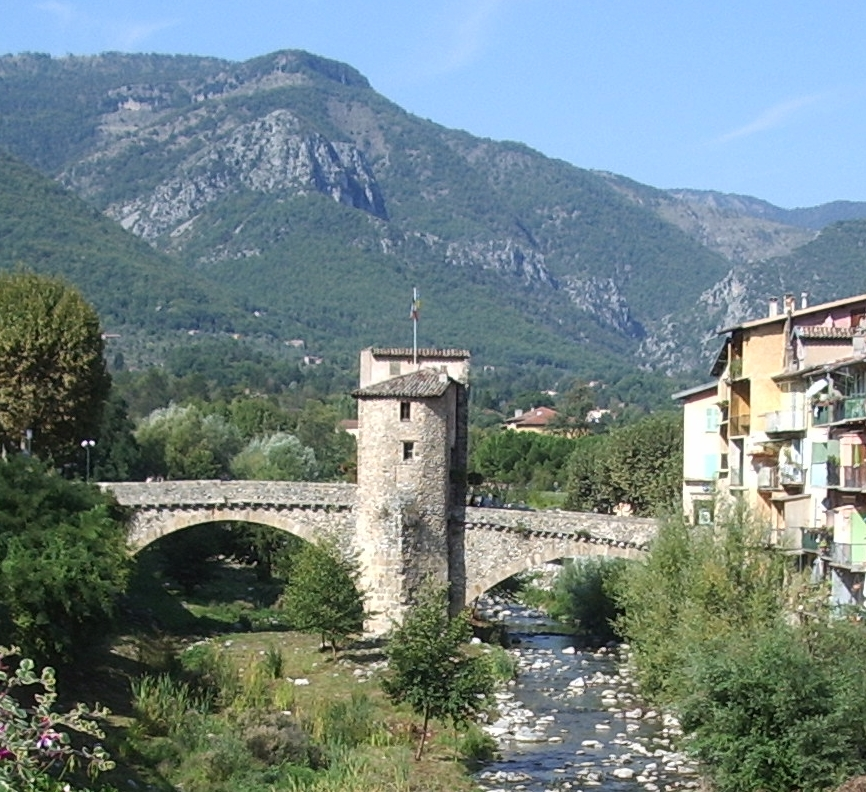
- Coordinates: 43.87799031°N 7.44917126°E
- Crosses: Bévéra
- Locale: Sospel, Alpes-Maritimes, France

Characteristics
- Design: Fortified arch bridge

Location
- Interactive map of Old Sospel Bridge

The Old Sospel Bridge (French: Vieux Pont de Sospel) is a bridge castle in Sospel, above the Bévéra river, in France.

== History ==
In the Middle Ages, Sospel was the chief town of the Lantosque valley viguerie and the county of Ventimiglia.

In 1217, a deed was drawn up "in Cespello ultra pontem" for the construction of a bridge, either in wood or stone.

A masonry bridge was first mentioned in 1522, when the first arch collapsed and had to be rebuilt.
