= Venus figurines of Balzi Rossi =

Upper Palaeolithic stone figurines

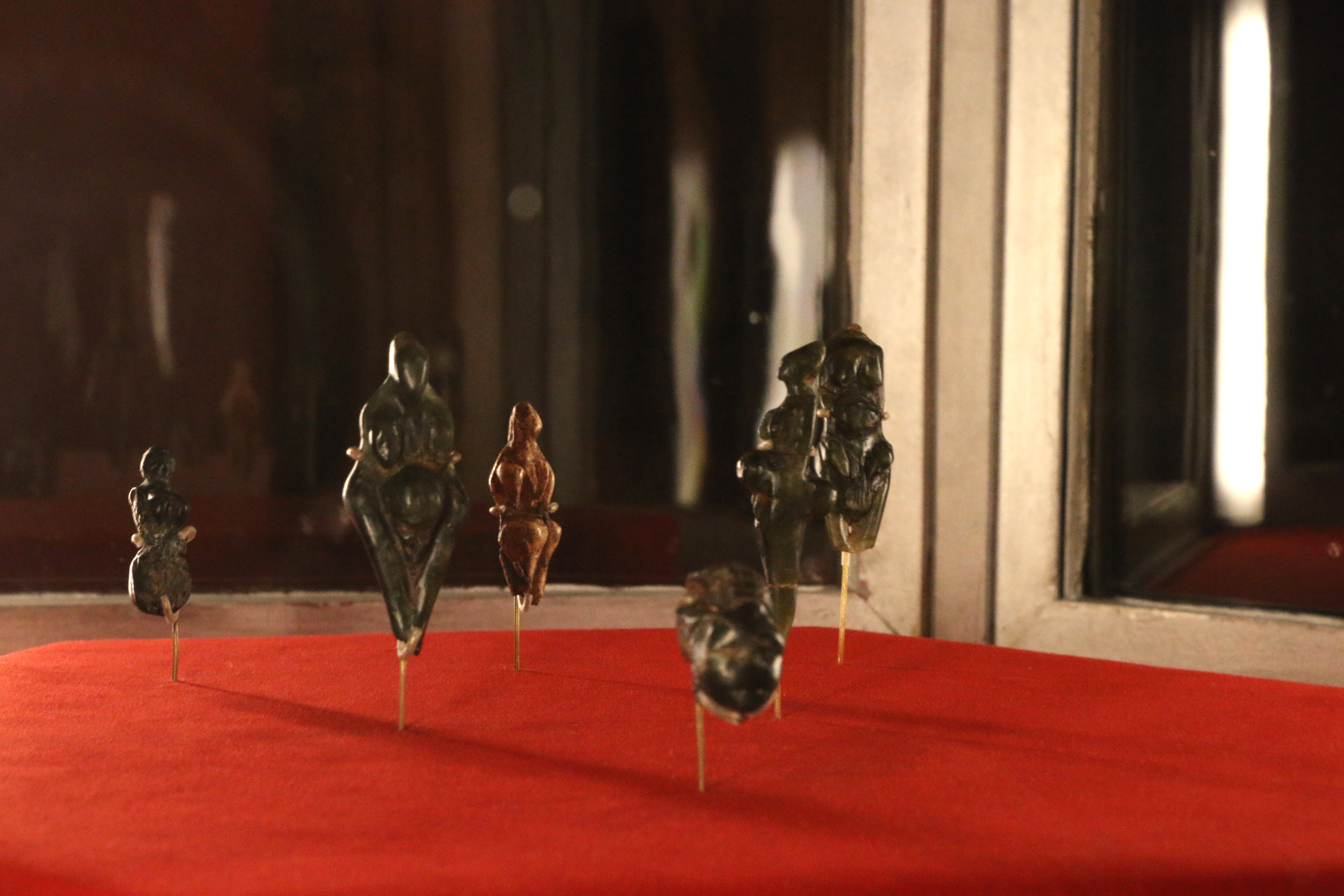
- Some of the Venus figurines
- Type: Stone figurines
- Material: Soapstone
- Height: Between 2.4 and 7.5 cm (1–3 in)
- Created: 24,000 to 19,000 years BP
- Discovered: c. 1889; Balzi Rossi, Ventimiglia, Liguria, Italy; 43.784°N 7.534°E
- Discovered by: Louis Jullien
- Present location: Musée d'Archéologie Nationale (Salle Piette) in Saint-Germain-en-Laye, France

The Venus figurines of Balzi Rossi (also: Venus figurines of Grimaldi, Venus figurines from the Balzi-Rossi-Caves) are thirteen Palaeolithic sculptures of the female body, from the caves near Grimaldi, Ventimiglia, Italy. Additionally, two small depictions of the human head were discovered at the same place. The age of these figurines cannot be determined because of missing archaeological context data. It is usually accepted that these figurines stem from the Gravettian, about 24,000 to 19,000 years old. Most of the sculptures consist of soapstone and are between 2.4 and 7.5 centimetres (1–3 inches) in height.‍

Between 1883 and 1895, the figurines were discovered by the antique dealer Louis Alexandre Jullien at the cave complex Balzi Rossi ('red rocks') at the Ligurian coast. Eight of these sculptures are housed in the museum Saint-Germain-en-Laye near Paris.

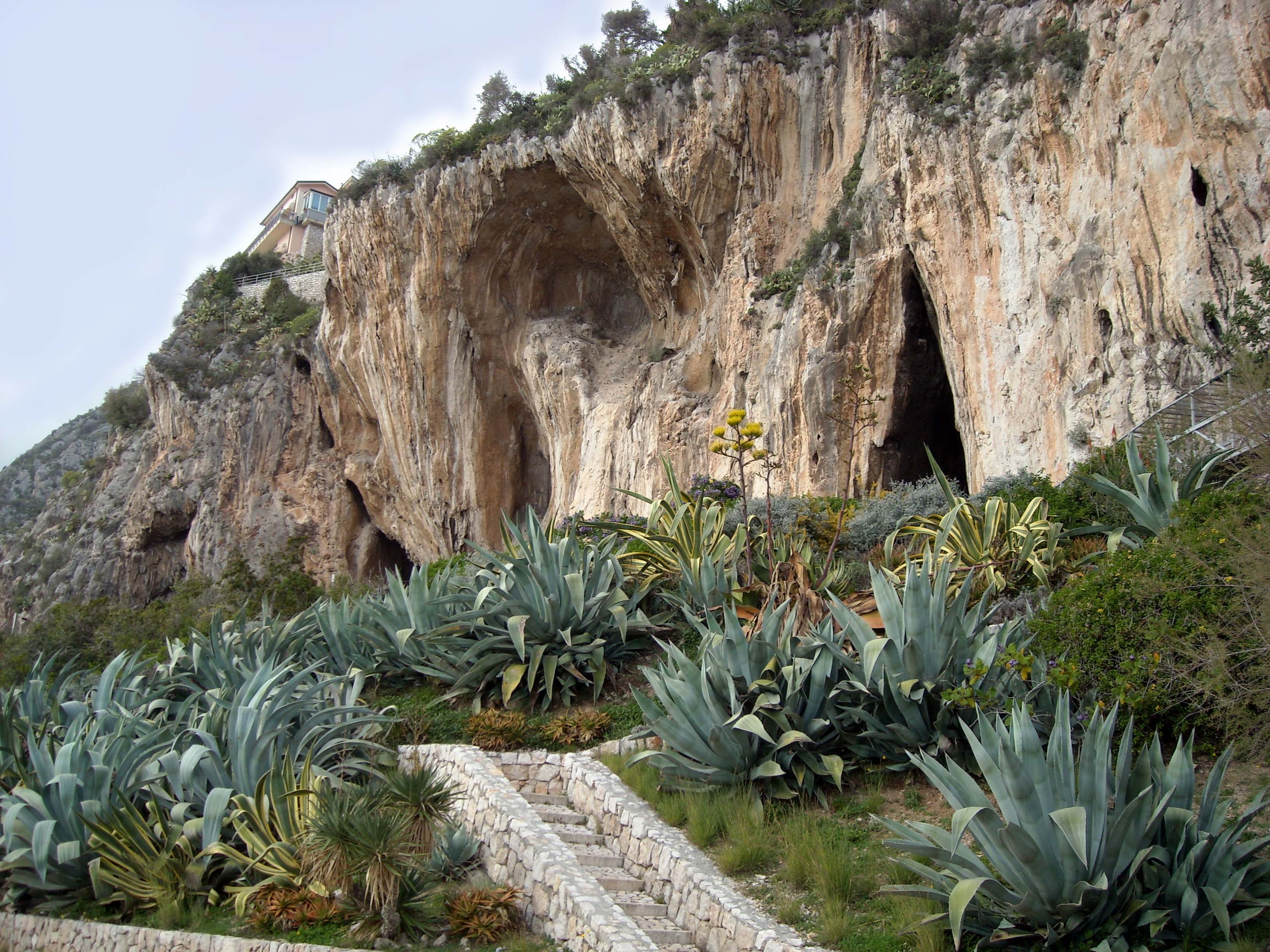
Balzi Rossi cave where the Venus figurines were found

== See also ==
- Venus figurines – Prehistoric statuette depicting a woman
- Grimaldi man – Hominin fossil
