= Col de Turini =

Mountain pass in the French Alps

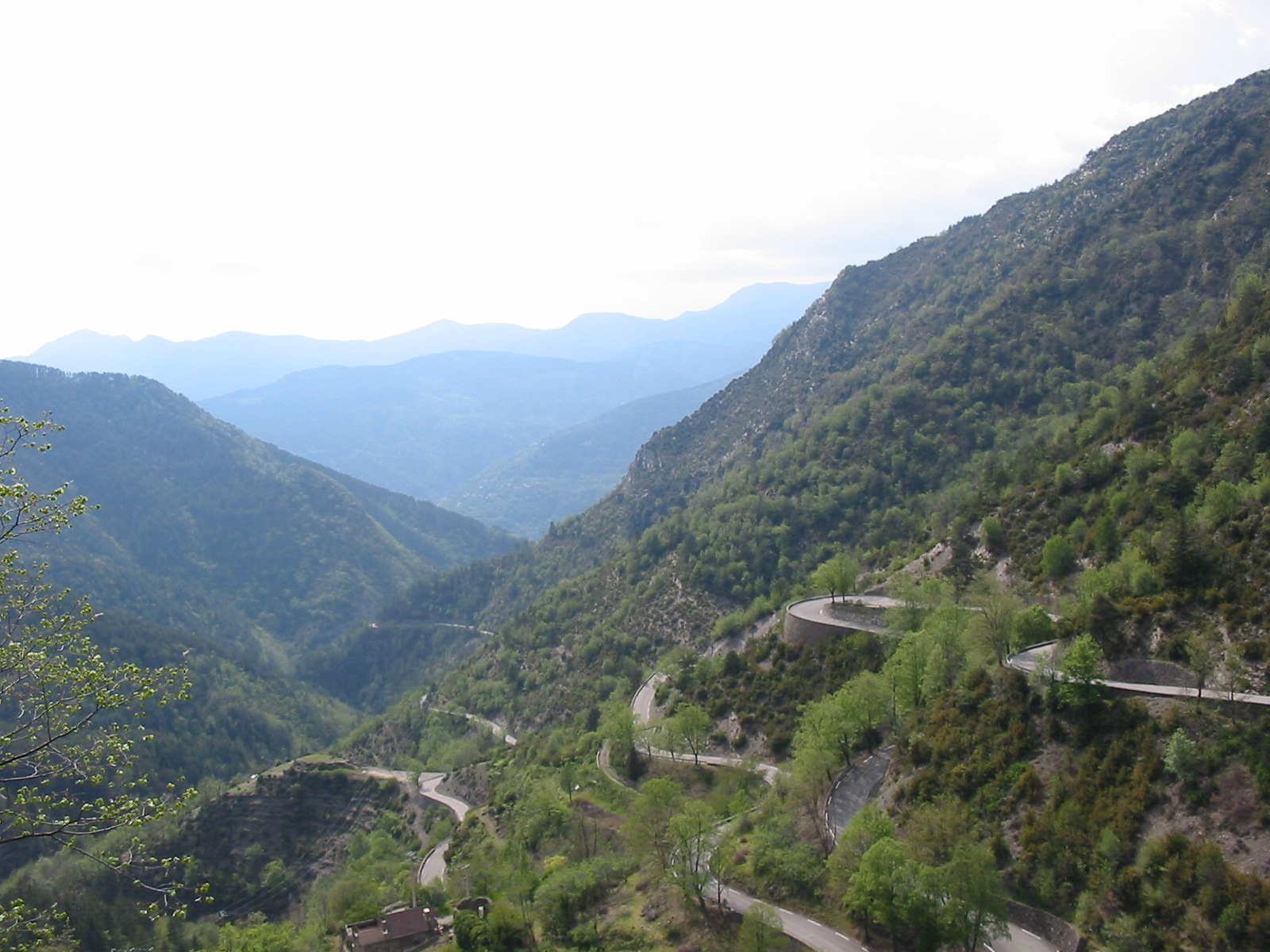

- Location within Alps
- Elevation: 1,607 m (5,272 ft)

Location
- Location: Alpes-Maritimes, France
- Range: Alps
- Coordinates: 43°58′40″N 07°23′30″E

The Col de Turini (el. 1607 m) is a high mountain pass in the Alps in the department of Alpes-Maritimes in France. Situated entirely in the Arrondissement of Nice, the road connects Lantosque in the commune La Bollène-Vésubie with Sospel in the commune Moulinet. It is the major road link between the river valley of the Vésubie and the Bévéra valley. It is notorious for its many hairpins and scenic landscapes.

== Auto racing ==
The Col de Turini features every year in the Monte Carlo Rally, held in January, as the setting of a 31-kilometre (19 mi) stage. The stage is run from La Bollène-Vésubie up to the summit of the mountain pass, and descending to Sospel, or the reverse trajectory. Known for its narrow road with many hairpin turns, the Col de Turini is the technical centrepiece of the rally. Until a few years ago, race pilots drove up the mountain pass at night, with thousands of fans watching the so-called "night of the long knives" as it was called, due to the strong high beam lights cutting through the night.

The Col de Turini featured in the first episode of Top Gear series 10 when the presenters intended to search the greatest driving road in the world.

== Cycling ==
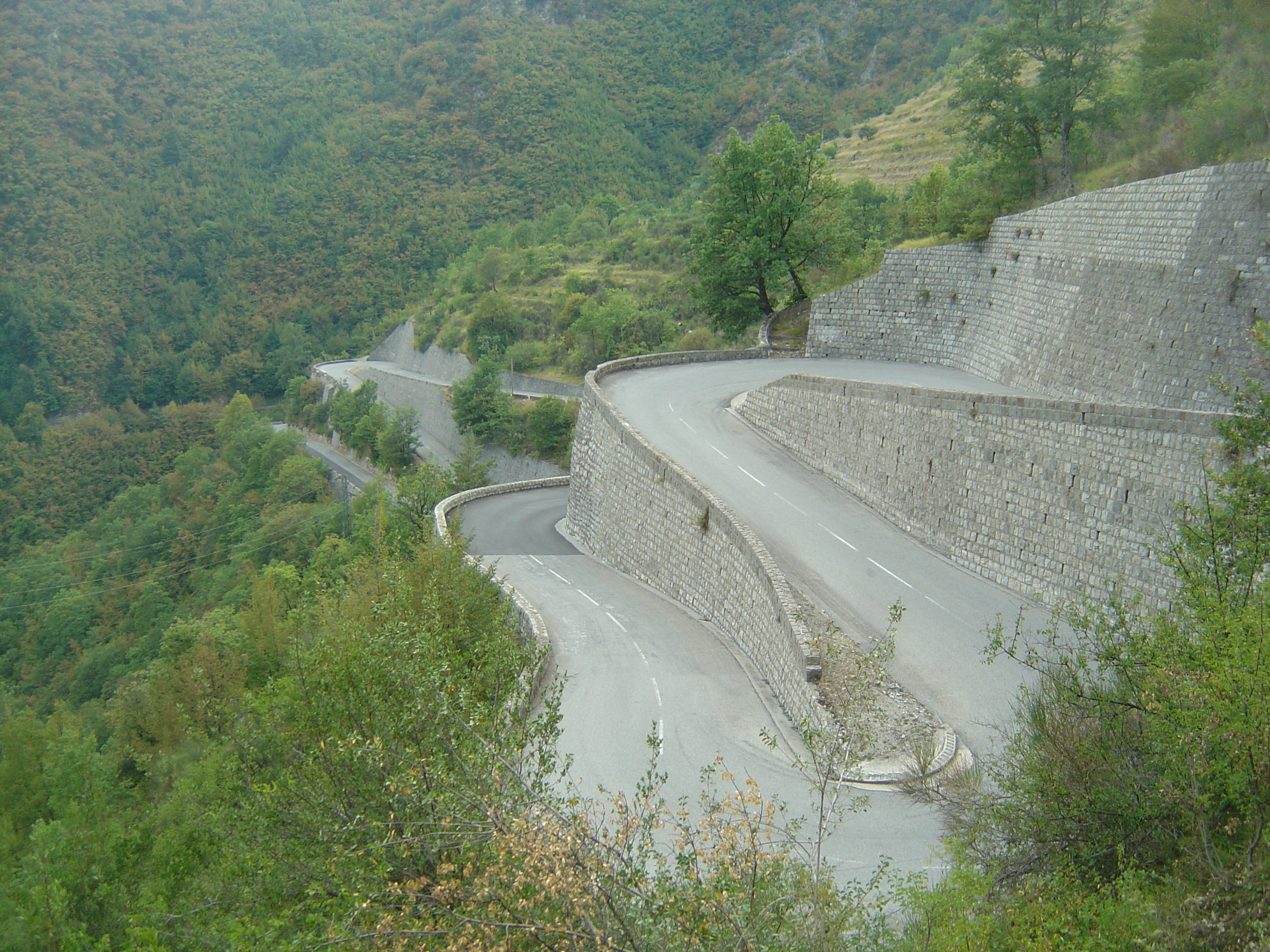
The Col de Turini's hairpin curves, pictured before Moulinet, on the southeastern part of the mountain pass.

The Col de Turini is occasionally included in cycling races. The western side of the col, starting in Lantosque in the Vésubie valley, is 15.3 km with an average gradient of 7.2% and a maximum gradient of 9%.

The southeastern ascent, starting in Sospel, is 24.1 km with an average gradient of 5.2% and a maximum gradient of 8%.

It featured four times in the Tour de France, always mid-race: in 1948, 1950, 1973 and 2024. In 2019, the Col de Turini was included in the Paris–Nice stage race. It hosted the finish of the seventh stage, climbed by its western ascent.

Appearances in the Tour de France:

Year	Stage	Start	Finish	Leader at the summit
1948	12	Sanremo	Cannes	Louison Bobet (FRA)
1950	15	Toulon	Menton	Jean Robic (FRA)
1973	10	Embrun	Nice	Vicente López Carril (ESP)
2020	2	Nice	Nice	Anthony Perez (FRA)
2024	20	Nice	Col de la Couillole	Richard Carapaz (ECU)

Appearances in Paris–Nice:

Year	Stage	Start	Finish	Leader at the summit
2019	7	Nice	Col de Turini	Daniel Martínez (COL)
2022	7	Nice	Col de Turini	Primož Roglič (SLO)

== See also ==
- List of highest paved roads in Europe
- List of mountain passes
