= Basséra =

- Location within France Location within Provence-Alpes-Côte d'Azur

Location
- Country: France

Physical characteristics
- Source
  - location: Maritime Alps
- Mouth
  - location: Bévéra
  - coordinates: 43°53′12″N 7°29′17″E
- Length: 8.5 km (5.3 mi)

Basin features
- Progression: Bévéra→ Roya→ Ligurian Sea

The Basséra (French pronunciation: [baseʁa]) is a short mountain river that flows through the Alpes-Maritimes department of southeastern France. It is 8.5 km (5.3 mi) long. Its source is in the Maritime Alps, and it flows into the river Bévéra, itself a tributary of the Roya, near Sospel.
