= Ouvrage Monte Grosso =

- Part of Maginot Line, Alpine Line
- Southeast France

Site information
- Controlled by: France

Location
- Coordinates: 43.9136°N 7.46309°E

Site history
- Built by: CORF
- In use: Abandoned
- Materials: Concrete, steel, rock excavation
- Battles/wars: Italian invasion of France, Operation Dragoon

Ouvrage Monte Grosso is a work (gros ouvrage) of the Maginot Line's Alpine extension, the Alpine Line, also known as the Little Maginot Line. The ouvrage consists of one entry block, four artillery blocks and two observation blocks facing Italy. It was the largest ouvrage in the Alps It is part of the fortifications surrounding Sospel, which protect the approaches to Nice from the north.

== Description ==
Monte Grosso, like L'Agaisen to the southeast, features gun turrets on a commanding height, at 967 meters. Monte Grosso possesses two turrets, one of 75mm and a unique 135mm turret, both retractable. Monte Grosso was built between November 1931 and June 1935, by a contractor named Borie. The cost was 40.4 million francs, of which 4.6 million francs were for the access road.

- Block 1 (entry): one machine gun cloche, one grenade launcher cloche and three machine gun embrasures.
- Block 2 (artillery): one machine gun cloche, one twin machine gun embrasure, two 75mm/29cal gun embrasures and two machine gun embrasures.
- Block 3 (mortar): one machine gun cloche and four 81mm mortar embrasures.
- Block 4 (artillery): one machine gun cloche and one twin 75mm/33cal gun turret.
- Block 5 (artillery): one grenade launcher cloche and one twin 135mm howitzer turret.
- Block 6 (infantry): one observation cloche, one machine gun cloche and two twin machine gun embrasures.
- Block 7 (infantry): one observation cloche, one machine gun cloche and twin machine gun embrasure.

An additional block near the entrance with a GFM cloche and two 75mm mortars was never built. The galleries extend along the length of the Monte Grosso ridge.

== History ==
On 15 June 1940, as Italian troops advanced into France, Monte Grosso fired on Italian mortar positions. On the 20th, it received fire from Italian 149mm guns, with a hit on its 75mm turret. The gun remained in operation

== See also ==
- List of Alpine Line ouvrages

== Bibliography ==
- Allcorn, William. The Maginot Line 1928-45. Oxford: Osprey Publishing, 2003. ISBN 1-84176-646-1
- Kaufmann, J.E. and Kaufmann, H.W. Fortress France: The Maginot Line and French Defenses in World War II, Stackpole Books, 2006. ISBN 0-275-98345-5
- Kaufmann, J.E., Kaufmann, H.W., Jancovič-Potočnik, A. and Lang, P. The Maginot Line: History and Guide, Pen and Sword, 2011. ISBN 978-1-84884-068-3
- Mary, Jean-Yves; Hohnadel, Alain; Sicard, Jacques. Hommes et Ouvrages de la Ligne Maginot, Tome 1. Paris, Histoire & Collections, 2001. ISBN 2-908182-88-2 (in French)
- Mary, Jean-Yves; Hohnadel, Alain; Sicard, Jacques. Hommes et Ouvrages de la Ligne Maginot, Tome 4 - La fortification alpine. Paris, Histoire & Collections, 2009. ISBN 978-2-915239-46-1 (in French)
- Mary, Jean-Yves; Hohnadel, Alain; Sicard, Jacques. Hommes et Ouvrages de la Ligne Maginot, Tome 5. Paris, Histoire & Collections, 2009. ISBN 978-2-35250-127-5 (in French)
