= James Henry Bennett =

English doctor

James Henry Bennett (1816–1891) was an English medical doctor who helped popularize the French Riviera as a winter holiday destination in the 19th century with his 1861 book Winter and Spring on the Shores of the Mediterranean. Bennett has been described by the Menton Tourist Board as the "Inventor of the Menton resort".

Bennett studied medicine in Paris, and after working as a doctor for 25 years contracted tuberculosis. Bennett went to the small coastal village of Menton in the South of France, close to the Italian border in 1859, wanting to "...die in a quiet corner, like a wounded denizen of the forest". Bennett's health greatly improved, and he visited Italy the next year, but found the "unhygienic state of the large towns of that classical land undid the good previously obtained". He returned to Menton and started a medical practice. Completely healed, he returned to England in the summer to see his patients. His routine would be to spend winter in Menton and take a holiday in April and May to study the Mediterranean climate and vegetation, traveling to Genoa, in Italy, before returning to England in the summer.

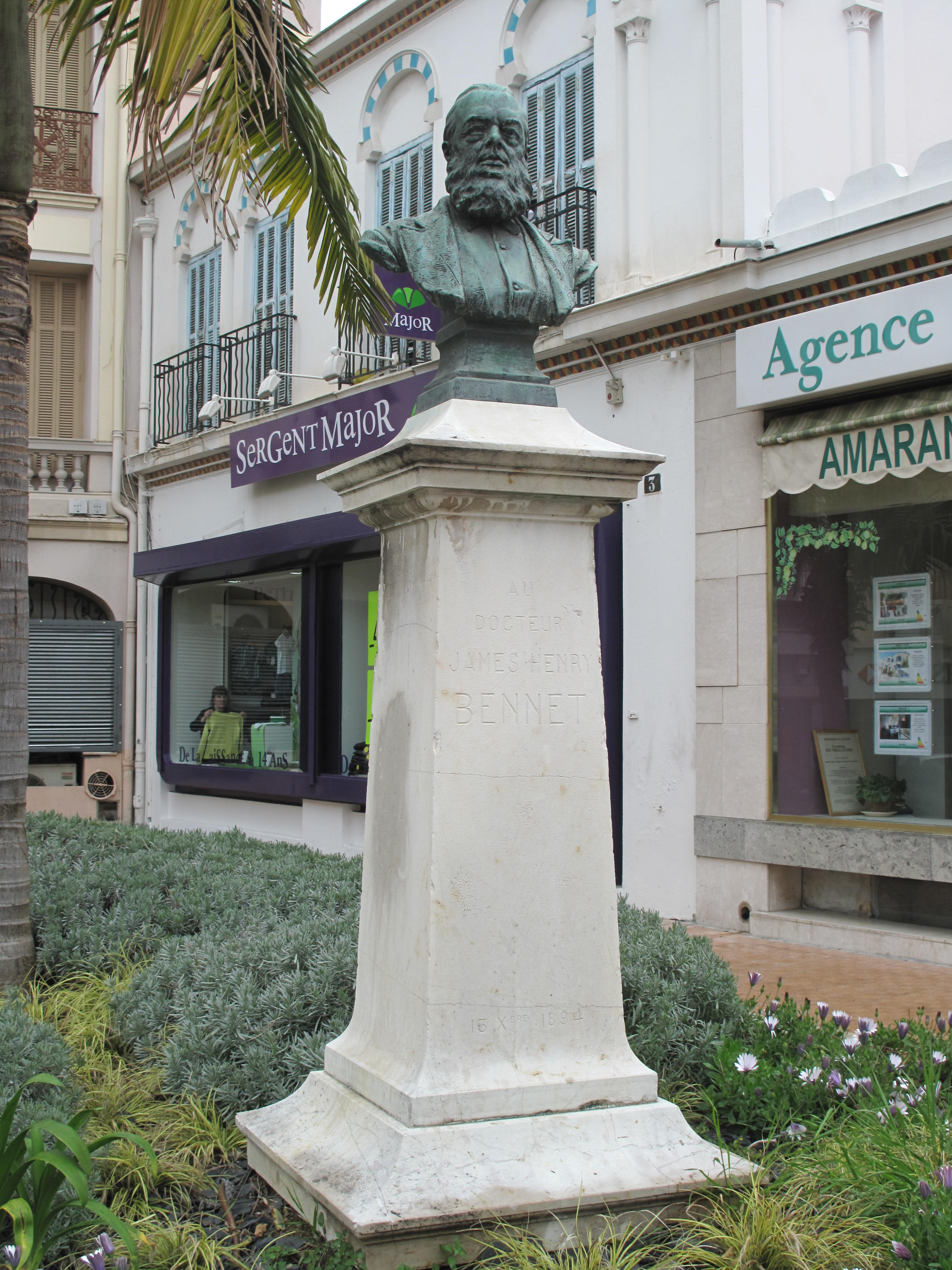
A monument to Bennet in Menton

Menton was connected by rail to Paris in 1869, which greatly increased the Alpes-Maritimes popularity as a destination for visitors. The construction of a rail link in 1861 between Nice and Ventimiglia, in Italy, allowed travelers to avoid the coastal road, which had previously been subject to dangerous mudslides. Bennett still advised his patients to come to Menton by road to "enjoy the wonderful spectacle." At the foothills of the Alps, Menton was sheltered from the winds and cold and heavy rain that characterised the region's weather. Enjoying a winter in mild weather provided a psychological boost for Bennett's patients; he wrote that they were "so charmed by the sun, the spectacle of nature and vegetation, they almost forgot their troubles." Bennett described the attractions of Menton and the South of France to his patients, finding that invoking the "...beauties of nature, the magnificence of the sun ...the intoxication of the ever-changing sea, they were able to face the long and difficult journey to the south". Bennett felt that the hot and dry climate of the French Riviera as well as a proper diet cured tuberculosis sufferers.

With the publication of Bennett's books, Menton's popularity as a destination greatly increased. His books were translated into German and also published in the United States. From "two or three hotels" in Menton in 1861, over 30 hotels had been built by 1875.

Notable patients of Bennett's included Robert Louis Stevenson and Queen Victoria. Bennett bought a ruined tower with land on the hills above Menton, creating an eight-acre garden. He would also travel to San Remo and Marseille to meet experts in horticulture. Bennett's garden was even visited by Queen Victoria and her youngest daughter, Princess Beatrice.

A street in Menton, Rue Henry Bennett, is named for him, and a monument in his honour was erected in Menton's Rue Partouneaux.

== Bibliography ==
- Winter and Spring on the Shores of the Mediterranean (1861)
- A Practical Treatise on Uterine Diseases
- Nutrition in Health and Disease
- A Review of the Present State of Uterine Pathology
- On the Treatment of Pulmonary Consumption In Its Connexion with Modern Doctrines
