= Ouvrage Champ de Tir =

- Part of Maginot Line, Alpine Line
- Southeast France

Site information
- Controlled by: France
- Open to the public: No

Location
- Coordinates: 43.89123°N 7.45093°E

Site history
- Built by: CORF/MOM
- In use: Abandoned
- Materials: Concrete, steel, rock excavation
- Battles/wars: Italian invasion of France, Operation Dragoon

Ouvrage Champ de Tir, also known as Champ de Tir de l'Agaisen (Agaisen firing range) is a lesser work (petit ouvrage) of the Maginot Line's Alpine extension, the Alpine Line. It is located at an altitude of 672 metres (2,205 ft), less than 1 kilometer to the northwest of Ouvrage l'Agaisen. The ouvrage consists of two entry blocks and one infantry block, sited to control the valley of the Nieya and to observe for l'Agaisen.

== Description ==
- Block 1 (entry): one machine gun embrasure.
- Block 2 (infantry): one machine gun embrasure.
- Block 3 (infantry): one Machine gun cloche and one twin machine gun embrasure.

The ouvrage is closed to the public.

== See also ==
- List of Alpine Line ouvrages

== Bibliography ==
- Allcorn, William. The Maginot Line 1928-45. Oxford: Osprey Publishing, 2003. ISBN 1-84176-646-1
- Kaufmann, J.E. and Kaufmann, H.W. Fortress France: The Maginot Line and French Defenses in World War II, Stackpole Books, 2006. ISBN 0-275-98345-5
- Kaufmann, J.E., Kaufmann, H.W., Jancovič-Potočnik, A. and Lang, P. The Maginot Line: History and Guide, Pen and Sword, 2011. ISBN 978-1-84884-068-3
- Mary, Jean-Yves; Hohnadel, Alain; Sicard, Jacques. Hommes et Ouvrages de la Ligne Maginot, Tome 1. Paris, Histoire & Collections, 2001. ISBN 2-908182-88-2 (in French)
- Mary, Jean-Yves; Hohnadel, Alain; Sicard, Jacques. Hommes et Ouvrages de la Ligne Maginot, Tome 4 - La fortification alpine. Paris, Histoire & Collections, 2009. ISBN 978-2-915239-46-1 (in French)
- Mary, Jean-Yves; Hohnadel, Alain; Sicard, Jacques. Hommes et Ouvrages de la Ligne Maginot, Tome 5. Paris, Histoire & Collections, 2009. ISBN 978-2-35250-127-5 (in French)
