= Sospel Cathedral =

Cathedral in Sospel, France

Coordinates: 43°52′37″N 7°26′49″E

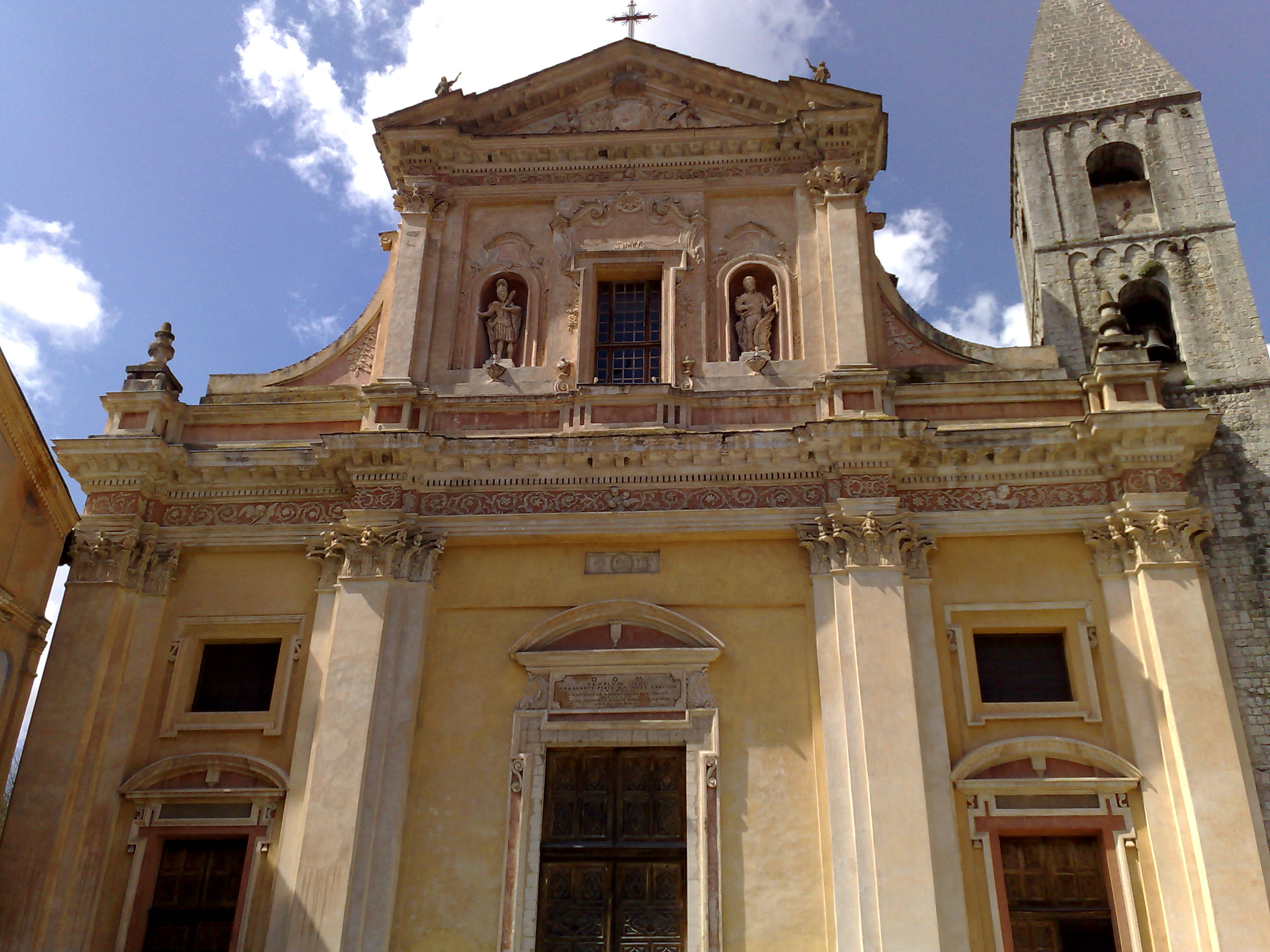
Sospel's former Cathedral, St. Michael's

Sospel Cathedral (French: Cocathédrale Saint-Michel de Sospel) is a Roman Catholic church and former cathedral in the town of Sospel, France.

It was formerly the seat of the schismatic Bishopric of Sospel, created in 1378 from the Diocese of Ventimiglia during the Great Schism as the Avignon-obedience seat of the effectively split bishopric (the 'Italian' part remaining loyal to Rome with seat in Ventimiglia) and restored to Rome's papal rule and Ventimiglia's diocesan authority (after three anti-bishops) in 1412; formally recognized as abolished under the Concordat of 1801. It is now in the Diocese of Nice.

Apart from a belltower of either the 11th or the 13th century, from the Lombard period of Sospel's history, the cathedral was built between 1642 and 1762, and is claimed to be the largest building in the Alpes-Maritimes. The Renaissance façade is from 1642, and contains in two niches the statues of the town's protectors, Saint Hippolytus and Saint Absende. Inside, the principal feature is the altarpiece in carved wood in three panels, containing the figure of the "Immaculate Virgin of Sospel". It is by the artist François Brea, of a family of artists from Nice, from the 15th or early 16th century.
