= Monte Grammondo =

Mountain in Italy

- Mont Grandmont
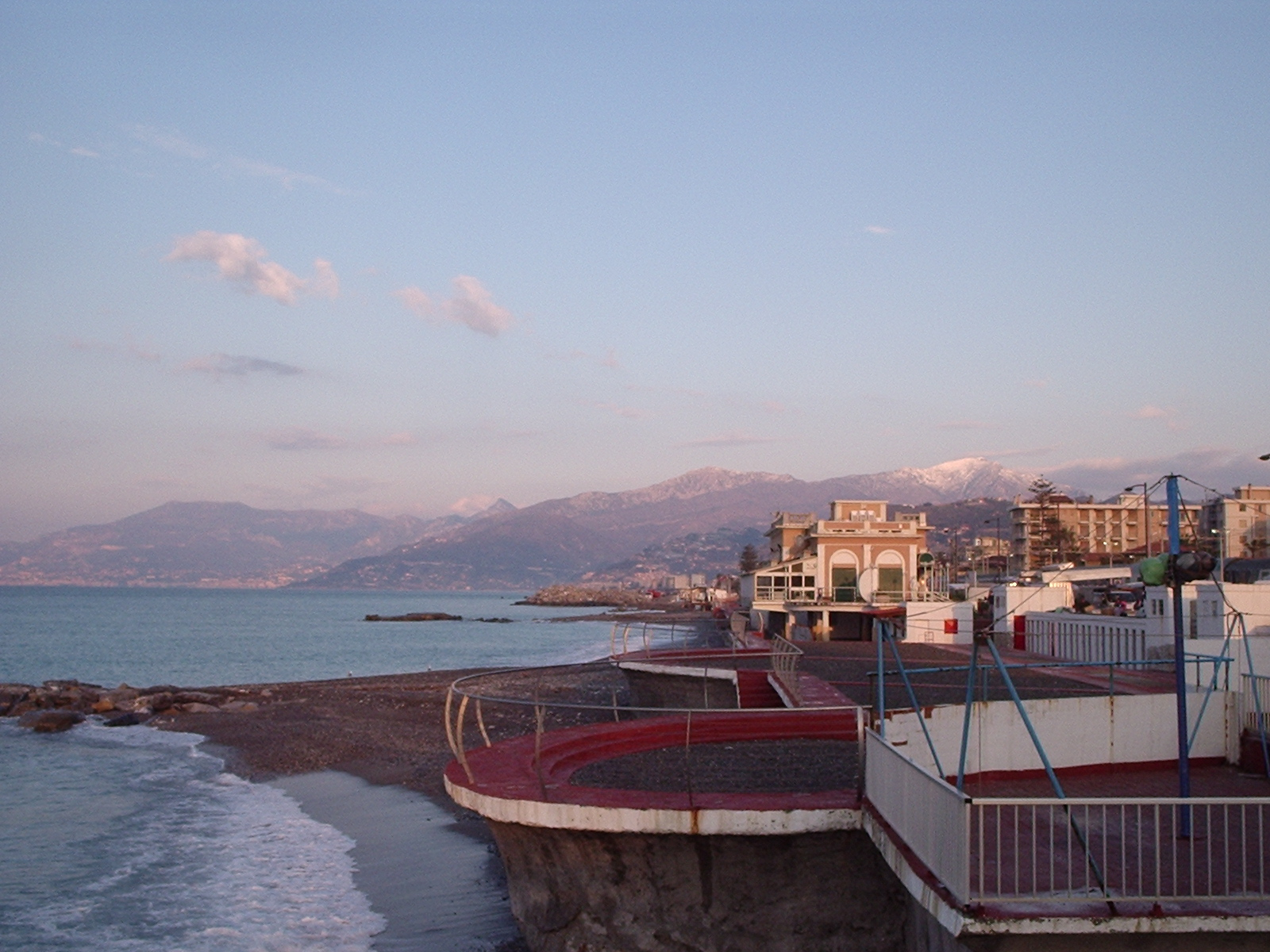
- Monte Grammondo snow-clad seen from Bordighera

Highest point
- Elevation: 1,378 m (4,521 ft)
- Prominence: 671
- Isolation: 9.33 km (5.80 mi)
- Coordinates: 43°50′29″N 07°30′31″E

Geography
- Location within Alps
- Location: Liguria, Italy; Provence-Alpes-Côte d'Azur, France
- Parent range: Alps

Monte Grammondo is a mountain in Liguria, northern Italy, part of the Alps.

== Geography ==
The mountain is located in the provinces of Imperia in Italy and Alpes-Maritimes in France. It lies at an altitude of 1378 metres.

=== SOIUSA classification ===
According to the SOIUSA (International Standardized Mountain Subdivision of the Alps) the mountain can be classified in the following way:

- main part = Western Alps
- major sector = South Western Alps
- section = Maritime Alps
- subsection = (Fr:Préalpes de Nice/It:Prealpi di Nizza)
- supergroup = (Fr:Groupe Rocaillon-Grand Braus/It: Gruppo Rocaillon-Grand Braus)
- group = (Fr:Chaîne Grand Baus-Razet-Grandmont/It:Catena Braus-Razet-Grandmont)
- code = I/A-2.II-A.2

== Access to the summit ==
Grammondo's top can be reached on foot from Bevera valley starting from the villages of Sospel (in France), Olivetta, Torri, San Pancrazio or Villatella (Italy), and also from Castellar and Castillon, located in the valleys nearby Menton (France).

== Conservation ==
The Italian slopes of Monte Grammondo, along with most of the Ligurian part of Bévéra valley, belongs to a SIC (Site of Community Importance) called M. Grammondo T. Bevera (code IT 1315717).
