= Ouvrage Castillon =

- Part of Maginot Line, Alpine Line
- Southeast France
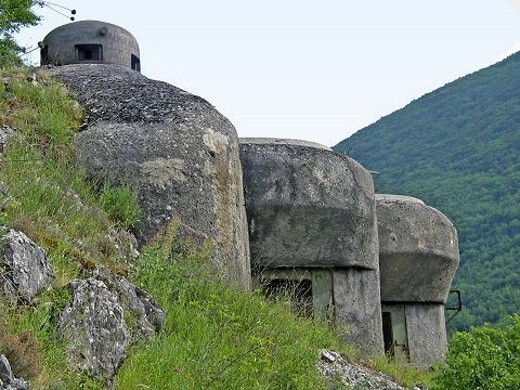

Site information
- Controlled by: France
- Open to the public: No

Location
- Coordinates: 43.83743°N 7.45828°E

Site history
- Built: 1931
- Built by: CORF
- In use: Abandoned
- Materials: Concrete, steel, rock excavation
- Battles/wars: Italian invasion of France, Operation Dragoon

Ouvrage Castillon is a work (gros ouvrage) of the Maginot Line's Alpine extension, the Alpine Line, also called the Little Maginot Line. The ouvrage consists of one entry block, two infantry blocks, and two artillery blocks in a narrow ridge just to the west of Castillon, Alpes-Maritimes. It was built on the original site of Castillon, destroyed by an earthquake in 1887. It is the next gros ouvrage in the line to the north of Ouvrage Sainte-Agnès, and is within firing range of the Mediterranean coastline.

Ouvrage Castillon was built by a contractor named Borie from November 1931 to October 1934 at a cost of 15.6 million francs. Castillon was manned in 1940 by 344 men under the command of Captain Finton.

== Description ==
Castillon was arranged on multiple levels, with the combat blocks significantly higher than the entry block, which is directly off paved road. However, because of the vulnerability of its supply line, Castillon was provided with two levels of utility, supply and magazine space, capable of holding four times the usual quantities of supplies and munitions.

- Block 1 (entry): three machine gun embrasures.
- Block 2 (ventilation), unoccupied.
- Block 3 (artillery block): one machine gun cloche, one grenade launcher cloche, two 75mm/1929 guns and two 81mm mortars.
- Block 4 (infantry block): one machine gun cloche, one grenade launcher cloche, one twin machine gun cloche and one twin machine gun embrasure.
- Block 5 (combat block): one machine gun cloche and one grenade launcher cloche one twin machine gun embrasure.
- Block 6 (infantry block): one machine gun cloche and two 81mm mortars.

=== Advanced posts ===
Castillon was associated with two avants-postes located about halfway between the ouvrage and the Italian frontier. These posts were built by MOM (Main d’Œuvre Militaire) in 1930 to a lesser standard than the CORF (Commission d'organisation des régions fortifiées)-built main line ouvrage. The avant-poste Baisse-de-Scuvion 43°51′01.9″N 07°28′24.18″E at an altitude of 1,018 metres (3,340 ft) controlled Mont-Mulcier and the Col de Cuore, with 32 men assigned. The post consisted of one entry block, one observation block with an observation cloche, and one block with a machine gun port, connected by a gallery with limited accommodations. The avant-poste Pierre-Pontue 43°50′34.33″N 07°28′52.82″E to the south at an altitude of 1,122 metres (3,681 ft) was larger, although it too was assigned 32 men. Pierre-Pontue comprised two entry blocks, one observation block with an observation cloche, and two casemates with machine gun ports. A modest set of galleries connected the blocks.

Five observation posts were attached to Castillon, including Mont-Ours-Sud, Baisse-du-Loup and Croix-de-Fossa.

== History ==
The Italian Modena Division attacked toward Castillon beginning on 22 June 1940 as part of an advance on Sospel, but was unable to advance before the armistice of 25 June. Italian troops attacked the avants-postes at Pierre-Pontue and Scuvion, but were discouraged by fire from Castillon itself on the 22nd. Further action took place the next day around the avants-postes, which were supported by fire from Ouvrage Barbonnet and Ouvrage Mont Agel as well as Castillon.

In 1944, Castillon was a center of German resistance to Operation Dragoon. On 10 September 1944 Castillon was attacked by American troops, supported by land and naval artillery, largely destroying the entry block, which faced toward the guns, and heavily damaging the combat blocks. The French battleship Lorraine participated in the bombardment. Castillon was abandoned by the Germans on 25 October 1944.

Castillon's war damage was repaired in the 1950s as part of a program to restore many of the gros ouvrages to military usefulness against an advance through Italy by the Warsaw Pact. However, by the 1970s nearly all ouvrages were decommissioned and sold. Castillon had already been decommissioned in 1964. The ouvrage is owned by the commune of Castillon, but is presently abandoned.

== See also ==
- List of Alpine Line ouvrages

== Bibliography ==
- Allcorn, William. The Maginot Line 1928-45. Oxford: Osprey Publishing, 2003. ISBN 1-84176-646-1
- Kaufmann, J.E. and Kaufmann, H.W. Fortress France: The Maginot Line and French Defenses in World War II, Stackpole Books, 2006. ISBN 0-275-98345-5
- Kaufmann, J.E., Kaufmann, H.W., Jancovič-Potočnik, A. and Lang, P. The Maginot Line: History and Guide, Pen and Sword, 2011. ISBN 978-1-84884-068-3
- Mary, Jean-Yves; Hohnadel, Alain; Sicard, Jacques. Hommes et Ouvrages de la Ligne Maginot, Tome 1. Paris, Histoire & Collections, 2001. ISBN 2-908182-88-2 (in French)
- Mary, Jean-Yves; Hohnadel, Alain; Sicard, Jacques. Hommes et Ouvrages de la Ligne Maginot, Tome 4 - La fortification alpine. Paris, Histoire & Collections, 2009. ISBN 978-2-915239-46-1 (in French)
- Mary, Jean-Yves; Hohnadel, Alain; Sicard, Jacques. Hommes et Ouvrages de la Ligne Maginot, Tome 5. Paris, Histoire & Collections, 2009. ISBN 978-2-35250-127-5 (in French)
