= Ciotti =

- Pronunciation: Italian: [ˈtʃɔtti]
- Language: Italian, Megleno-Romanian

Origin
- Region of origin: Italy

Ciotti is an Italian surname. It is also present in Megleno-Romanian. Notable people with the surname include:

== Politics ==
- Dumitru Ciotti (1882/1885–1974), Megleno-Romanian activist
- Éric Ciotti (born 1965), French right-wing politician (Mayor of Nice)
- Pompeo Ciotti (1858–1915), Italian socialist

== Sport ==
- Dragutin Ciotti (1905–1974), Croatian gymnast
- Giulio Ciotti (born 1976), Italian high jumper
- Nicola Ciotti (born 1976), Italian high jumper
- Pietro Ciotti (born 1999), Italian footballer

== Other fields ==
- Giovanni Battista Ciotti (1560–1625), Italian publisher
- Luigi Ciotti (born 1945), Italian priest
- Nicholas Ciotti (1944–2003), American mobster
- Roberto Ciotti (1953–2013), Italian musician and composer
