= Moulinet, Alpes-Maritimes =

Commune in Provence-Alpes-Côte d'Azur, France

Moulinet
- Commune
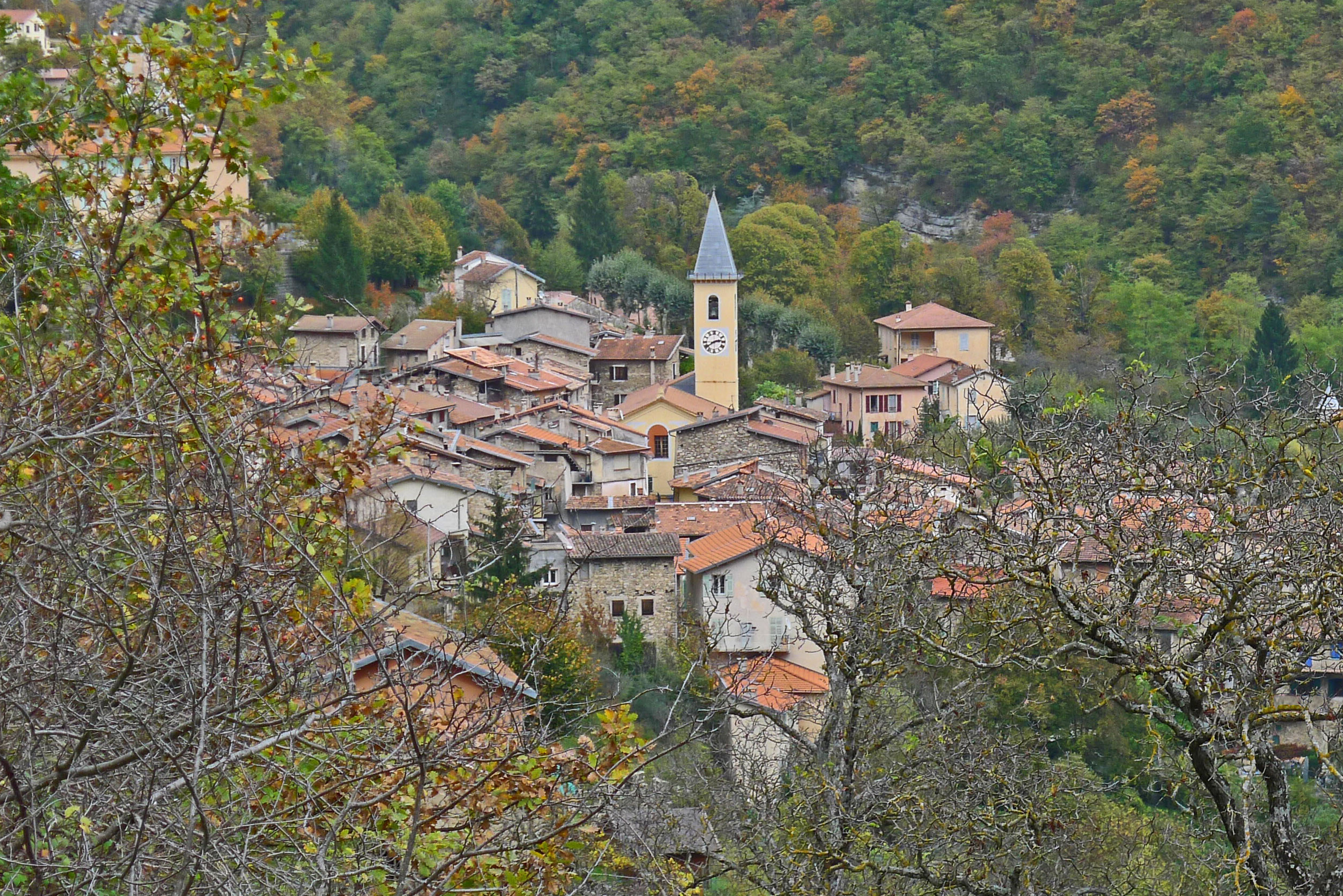
- A view of the village of Moulinet from the trail of Saint Michel

- Coat of arms
- Location of Moulinet
- Location within France Location within Provence-Alpes-Côte d'Azur
- Coordinates: 43°56′30″N 7°24′48″E
- Country: France
- Region: Provence-Alpes-Côte d'Azur
- Department: Alpes-Maritimes
- Arrondissement: Nice
- Canton: Contes
- Intercommunality: CA Riviera Française

Government
  - Mayor (2026–32): Guy Bonvallet
- Area^{1}: 41.07 km^{2} (15.86 sq mi)
- Highest elevation: 2,080 m (6,820 ft)
- Lowest elevation: 516 m (1,693 ft)
- Population (2023): 268
  - Density: 6.53/km^{2} (16.9/sq mi)
- Time zone: UTC+01:00 (CET)
  - Summer (DST): UTC+02:00 (CEST)
- INSEE/Postal code: 06086 /06380
- ^{1} French Land Register data, which excludes lakes, ponds, glaciers > 1 km^{2} (0.386 sq mi or 247 acres) and river estuaries.

Moulinet (French pronunciation: [mulinɛ]; Occitan: O Morinhet; Italian: Molinetto) is a commune in the Alpes-Maritimes department in southeastern France.

== Climate ==
Climate data for Moulinet(1981-2010), altitude: 817 m
Month	Jan	Feb	Mar	Apr	May	Jun	Jul	Aug	Sep	Oct	Nov	Dec	Year
Mean daily maximum °C (°F)	8.5 (47.3)	9.3 (48.7)	12.4 (54.3)	14.4 (57.9)	19.3 (66.7)	23.1 (73.6)	26.3 (79.3)	26.1 (79.0)	21.8 (71.2)	17.2 (63.0)	11.7 (53.1)	8.7 (47.7)	16.6 (61.8)
Daily mean °C (°F)	4.3 (39.7)	4.6 (40.3)	7.4 (45.3)	9.5 (49.1)	13.9 (57.0)	17.4 (63.3)	20.1 (68.2)	20.1 (68.2)	16.4 (61.5)	12.4 (54.3)	7.6 (45.7)	4.8 (40.6)	11.5 (52.8)
Mean daily minimum °C (°F)	0.0 (32.0)	−0.1 (31.8)	2.3 (36.1)	4.6 (40.3)	8.5 (47.3)	11.7 (53.1)	14.3 (57.7)	14.2 (57.6)	10.9 (51.6)	7.6 (45.7)	3.4 (38.1)	0.9 (33.6)	6.5 (43.7)
Average precipitation mm (inches)	82.1 (3.23)	62.6 (2.46)	63.5 (2.50)	108.9 (4.29)	99.5 (3.92)	63.3 (2.49)	48.0 (1.89)	57.7 (2.27)	98.5 (3.88)	150.9 (5.94)	142.4 (5.61)	117.8 (4.64)	1,095.2 (43.12)
Average precipitation days (≥ 1 mm)	5.7	5.1	6	9.7	9.4	7.1	5.4	5.2	6.7	8.6	7.4	6.5	82.8
Source: Infoclimat

== Population ==
Historical population
Year	Pop.	±% p.a.
1968	265	—
1975	220	−2.62%
1982	164	−4.11%
1990	193	+2.06%
1999	249	+2.87%
2007	223	−1.37%
2012	224	+0.09%
2017	273	+4.04%
2023	268	−0.31%
Source: INSEE

== See also ==
- Col de Turini
- Communes of the Alpes-Maritimes department
