= Balzi Rossi =

Caves and archaeological site in Italy

Coordinates: 43.784°N 7.534°E

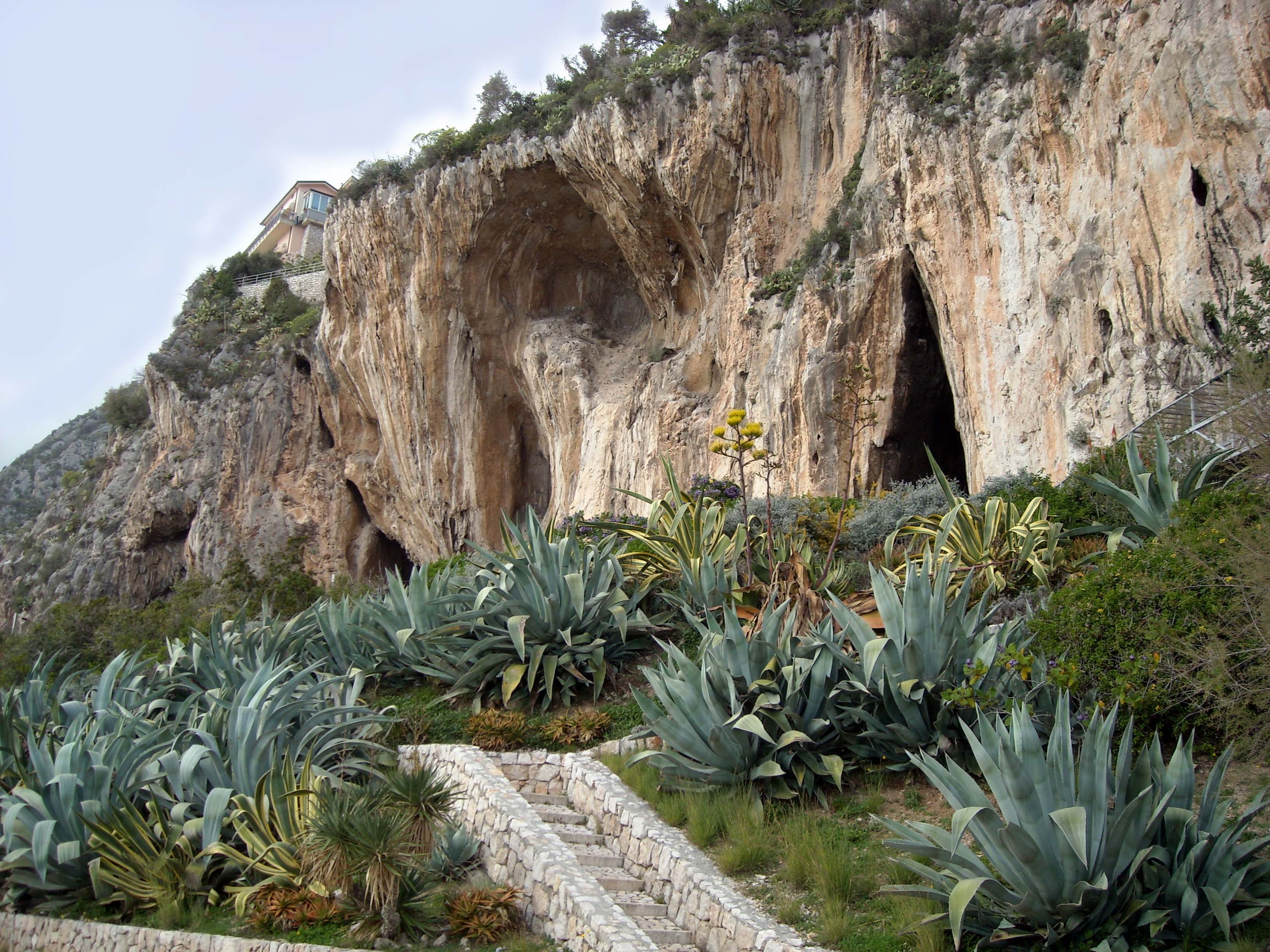
Cave entrances

The Balzi Rossi caves (Ligurian: baussi rossi "red rocks") in Ventimiglia comune, Liguria, Italy, is one of the most important archaeological sites of the early Upper Paleolithic in Western Europe. Constance Fenimore Woolson visited in 1880 the Cavillon cave overlooking the via Julia Augusta and presented an account, in her travel piece "At Mentone", of the discovery in the Balzi Rossi caves of a prehistoric skeleton and culture. It has been continually excavated by archaeologists for more than 150 years.

- Riparo Mochi remains evidence for the earliest presence of modern humans in Europe (early Aurignacian, 35,000 years ago). A hearth excavated there between 2019 and 2022, dated to about 30,800 to 29,900 years ago, provides the earliest date directly associated with the Noaillian, a Gravettian tradition, in northern Tyrrhenian Italy.
- Grimaldi Man (Gravettian, c. 25,000 years)
- Venus figurines of Balzi Rossi (Gravettian, c. 22,000 years)
