= Nicholas Ciotti =

Nicholas J. Ciotti
- Born: June 15, 1944
- Died: March 28, 2003 (age 58)
- Other name: Buddy
- Occupations: President of All Games Amusement, OK Amusement, Universal Amusement, Chicago Outfit associate
- Spouse(s): Daryl Ciotti(died 1971), Diane Ciotti (?), Mary Nolan Ciotti (until his death)
- Children: Julie and Nick and Dean (from Daryl), Jana Nolan (stepdaughter from Mary)

Nicholas J. "Buddy" Ciotti was a Chicago Outfit associate and poker machine kingpin. Ciotti was the owner of All Games Amusement Inc., which supplied illegal video gambling machines to several Chicago suburbs, including Stone Park, Northlake, Melrose Park, Franklin Park and River Grove. In 2000 he pleaded guilty in federal court to gambling conspiracy and money laundering charges. He was released from prison on August 2, 2002 and died several months later at the age of 58.
