= Bévéra =

River in France

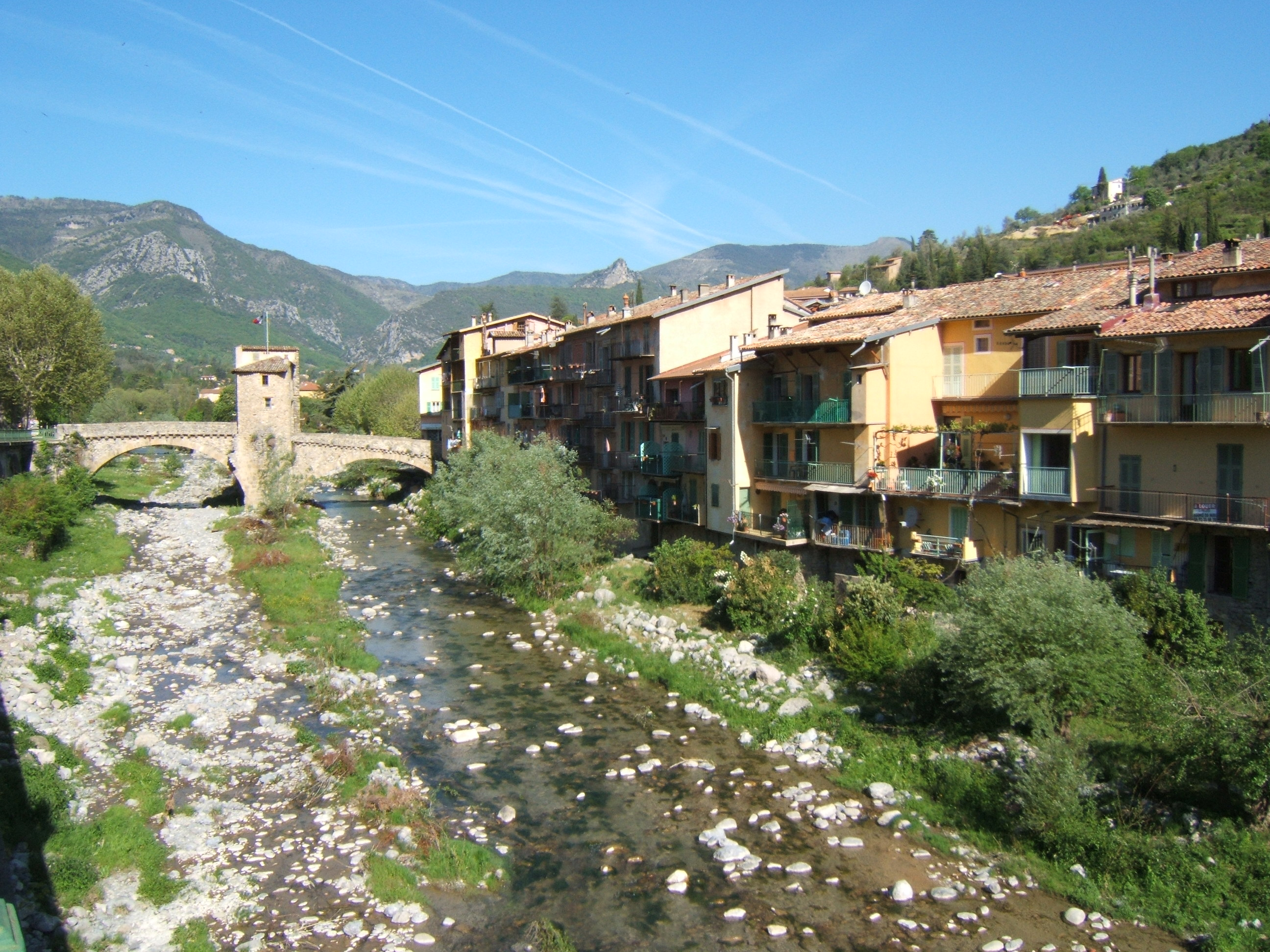

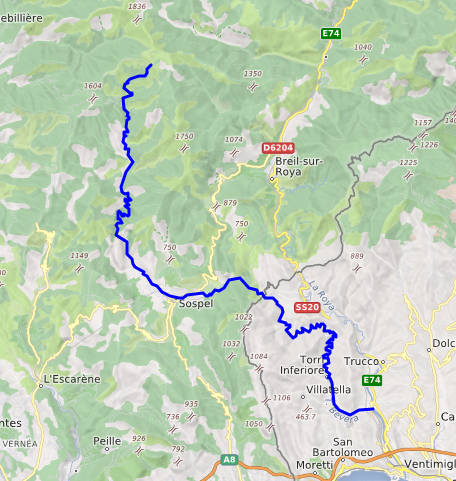

Location
- Countries: France; Italy

Physical characteristics
- Source
  - location: Maritime Alps
- Mouth
  - location: Roya
  - coordinates: 43°49′19″N 7°35′3″E
- Discharge
  - average: 2.24 m^{3}/s (79 cu ft/s)

Basin features
- Progression: Roya→ Ligurian Sea

The Bévéra (in French, pronounced [beveʁa]) or Bevera (in Italian) (Beura in Occitan and Ligurian) is a river of southeastern France and northwestern Italy.

== Geography ==
Bévéra source is in the Maritime Alps, near Moulinet in the French Alpes-Maritimes department. It flows generally southeast, through Sospel, crosses the Italian border (province of Imperia) and discharges into the river Roya, near Ventimiglia. Its length within France is 26.1 kilometres (16.2 mi). The Basséra is one of its tributaries.

== Conservation ==
Most of the Ligurian part of Bevera valley, along with the Italian slopes of Monte Grammondo, belongs to a SIC (Site of Community Importance) called M. Grammondo T. Bevera (code IT 1315717).
