= Ventimiglia =

Town in Liguria, Italy

Ventimiglia Ventemiglia (Ligurian) Ventemilha (Occitan)
- Comune
- Città di Ventimiglia
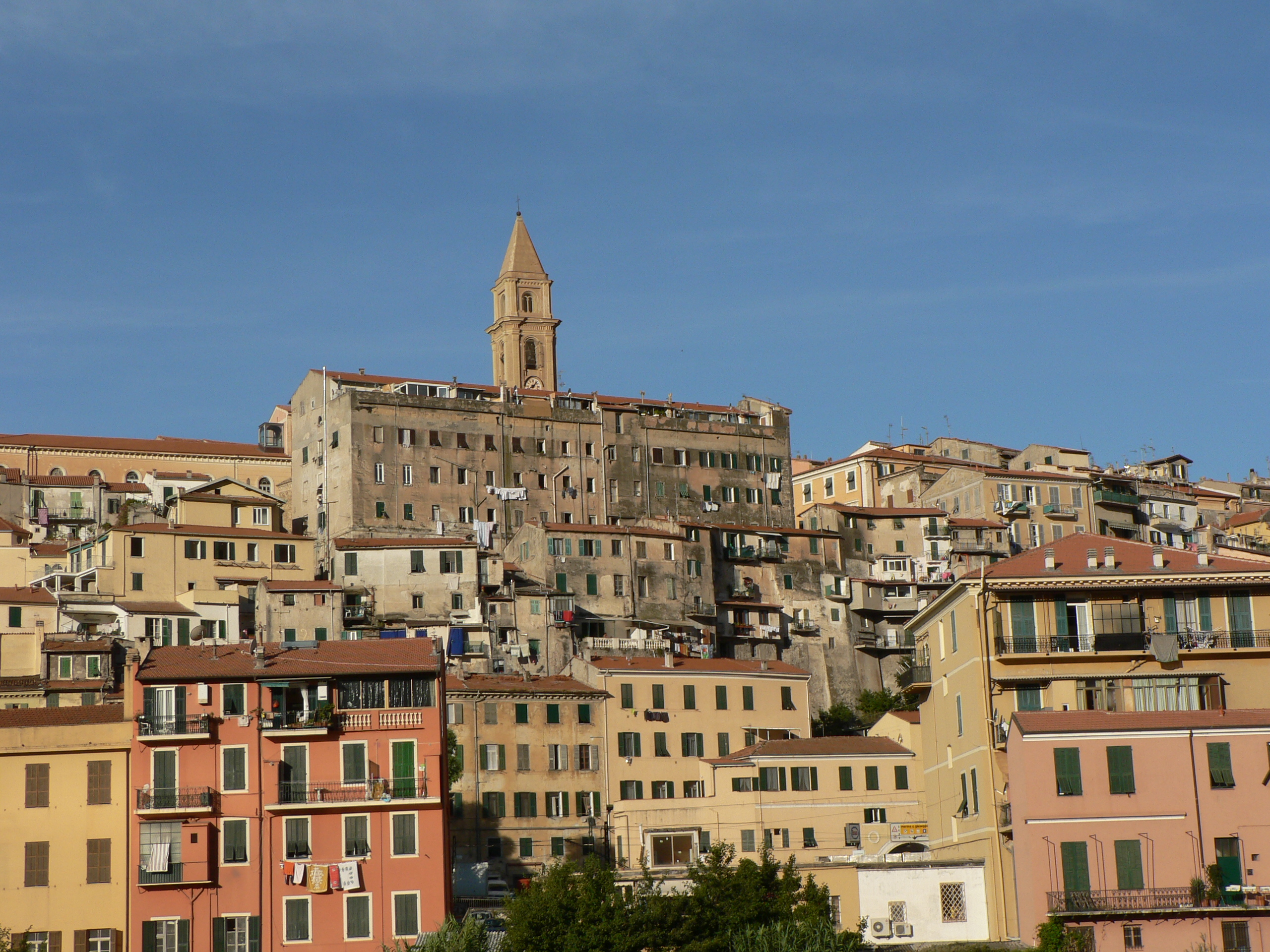
- Panorama of Ventimiglia

- Flag Coat of arms

- Location within Liguria Location within Italy
- Coordinates: 43°47′25″N 7°36′30″E
- Country: Italy
- Region: Liguria
- Province: Imperia (IM)
- Frazioni: Grimaldi, Mortola Inferiore, Mortola Superiore (i Ciotti), Latte, Carletti, Sealza, Sant'Antonio, Villatella, Ville, Calandri, San Lorenzo, San Bernardo, Seglia, Bevera, Calvo, San Pancrazio, Torri, Varase, Roverino, Porra, Trucco, Verrandi

Government
  - Mayor: Flavio Di Muro (Since 2023) (Lega)

Area
  - Total: 54.01 km^{2} (20.85 sq mi)
- Elevation: 9 m (30 ft)

Population (28 February 2017)
  - Total: 24,120
  - Density: 446.6/km^{2} (1,157/sq mi)
- Demonym(s): Ventimigliesi (ita), Ventemigliusu (lij)
- Time zone: UTC+1 (CET)
  - Summer (DST): UTC+2 (CEST)
- Postal code: 18039
- Dialing code: 0184
- Patron saint: San Secondo
- Saint day: 26 August
- Website: Official website

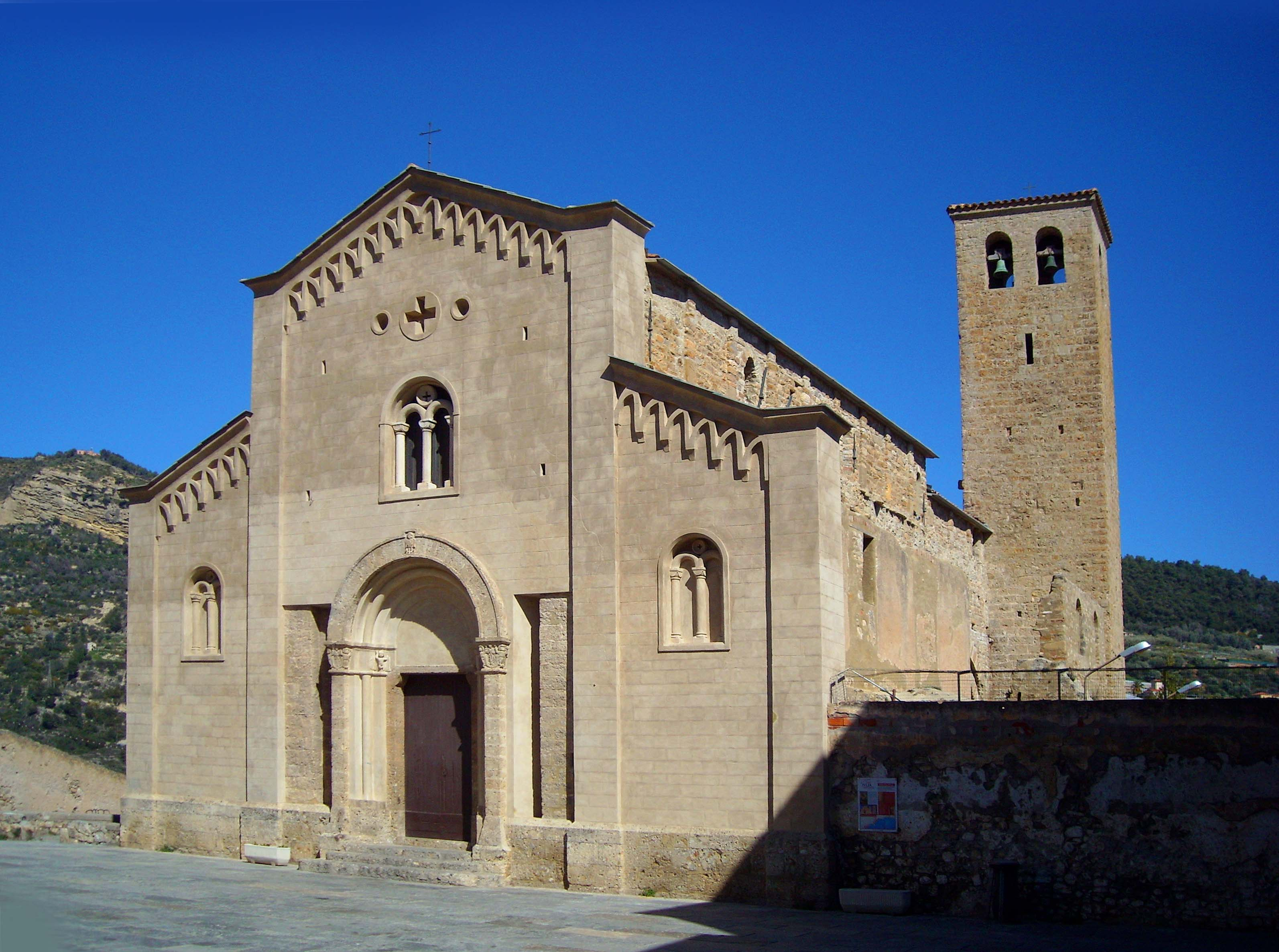
Church of San Michele Arcangelo

Ventimiglia (Italian: [ventiˈmiʎʎa]; Intemelio: Ventemiglia [veŋteˈmiʎa], Genoese: Vintimiggia; French: Vintimille [vɛ̃timij]; Provençal: Ventemilha [venteˈmiʎɔ]) is a resort town in the province of Imperia, Liguria, on the Italian Riviera in northern Italy. It is located 130 km (81 mi) west of Genoa, and 7 km (4.3 mi) from the French-Italian border, on the Gulf of Genoa, having a small harbour at the mouth of the Roia river, which divides the town into two parts. Ventimiglia's urban area has a population of 55,000.

== Etymology ==
The name Ventimiglia derives from Album Intimilium, which later became 'Albintimilium', Vintimilium, then Ventimiglia. The similarity to the phrase venti miglia ("twenty miles") is coincidental, although the town was almost exactly 20 statute miles from France between 1388 and 1860.

== History ==
Ventimiglia is the ancient Album Intimilium, the capital of the Intimilii, a Ligurian tribe.

In the Gothic Wars it was besieged by the Byzantines and the Goths, and later suffered from the raids of Rothari, King of the Lombards, but flourished again under Rodoald. In the 10th century, it was attacked by the Saracens of Fraxinet. After a period as an independent commune, it was ruled by the Counts of Ventimiglia, and often had to fight against the Republic of Genoa.

In 1139 the Genoese attacked it by land and sea and forced it to surrender; the count continued to hold the city and countship as a vassal of the victors. The city rebelled more than once against the Genoese and sided with their enemies.

In 1271 in a war with Genoa, its podestà Luca Grimaldi was captured. Ventimiglia was thus temporarily held by the dukes of Savoy (1389 and 1746) and King Ladislaus of Naples (1410). In 1505 it was annexed to the Genoese Republic, sharing its history until the early 19th century.

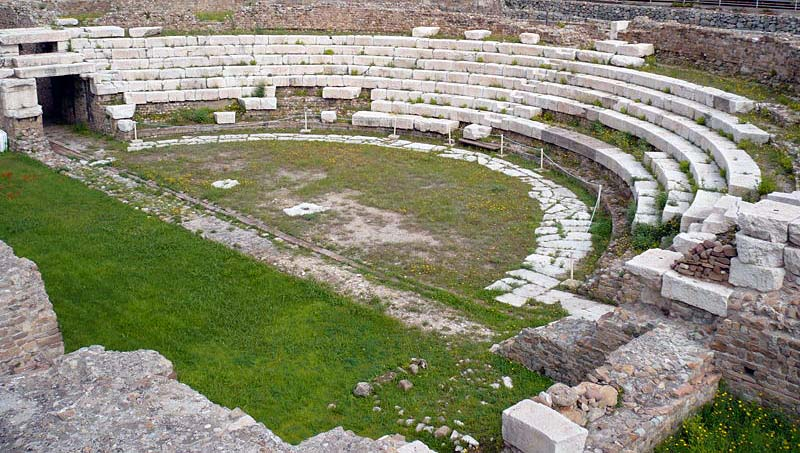
Roman theatre

In 1269 the Count of Ventimiglia, Guglielmo Pietro I Balbo married Eudossia Laskaris, daughter of Emperor Theodore II Laskaris. From them started the dynasty of the Lascaris of Tenda. They maintained the sovereign County of Tenda until 1501 when the last of them, Anne Lascaris, married Renato of Savoy (in French René de Savoie) and transferred the County to his cadet branch of the Savoy dynasty.

== Main sights ==
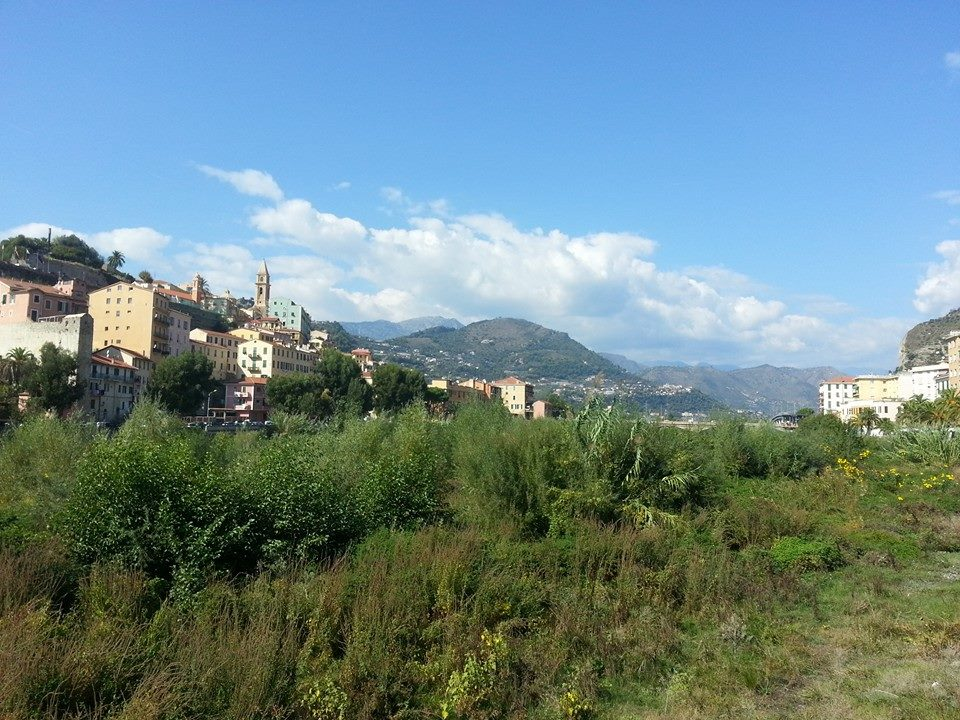
View from bridge in Ventimiglia

Remains of a Roman theatre (first half of the second century) are visible, and remains of many other buildings have been discovered, among them traces of the ancient city walls, a fine mosaic, found in 1852 but at once destroyed, and a number of tombs to the west of the theatre. The ruins of the ancient Albintimilium are situated in the plain of Nervia, c. 2 kilometres (1 mile) to the east of the modern town.

The caves of the Balzi Rossi have proved rich in palaeolithic remains of the Quaternary period. Remains of a family of Cro-Magnon people were discovered, with several skeletons of men, women and children.

Very important architecturally and historically is the ancient medieval city centre, perched on a hill overlooking the new town. The Church of San Michele Arcangelo was erected in the 10th century by the Counts of Ventimiglia on the foundations of a pagan temple. Later it was entrusted to the Benedictines of Lirins. In the 11th-12th centuries, it was rebuilt in Romanesque style. In 1628 its aisles were lost after an earthquake. It houses milestones from the old Via Iulia Augusta, two of which are used as stoups and one supports the crypt's vault.

The present Romanesque Cathedral dedicated to the Assumption, Cattedrale di Nostra Signora Assunta, with an 11th-century baptistery, see of the present Diocese of Ventimiglia-San Remo (just Ventimiglia until 1957, founded 670), is built on the ruins of an earlier Lombard church, which in turn was on the site of a Roman building, possibly a temple.

The municipal library has the second-largest collection of 17th-century manuscripts and books in Italy (the biggest collection is in Venice).

The Giardini Botanici Hanbury (Hanbury Botanical Gardens), surrounding the villa of Sir Thomas Hanbury, La Mortola, are the biggest in Italy, boasting many varieties of tropical and sub-tropical species that thrive in this mild climate.

Near Ventimiglia are the Genoese fortresses of Castel d'Appio, Forte San Paolo and Fortezza dell'Annunziata.

== Tourism ==
Ventimiglia is a popular summer destination for tourists on the French Riviera. Particularly popular all year with visitors from France is the weekly street market (held on a Friday), along the seafront of the new town, which causes major traffic congestion.

== Transportation ==
Ventimiglia is on the Via Aurelia Provincial Road, and has a junction on the A10 Motorway.

The Ventimiglia railway station connects the line from Genoa to France with the Marseille–Ventimiglia railway and the line to Cuneo.

== International relations ==
There is a Royal Spanish honorary consulate in Ventimiglia.

=== Twin towns – Sister cities ===
Ventimiglia is twinned with:

- (Italy) Piazza Armerina, Sicily

== See also ==
- Diocese of Ventimiglia-San Remo
- Seborga
- Biblioteca Aprosiana
