= Sospel =

Commune in Provence-Alpes-Côte d'Azur, France

- Commune
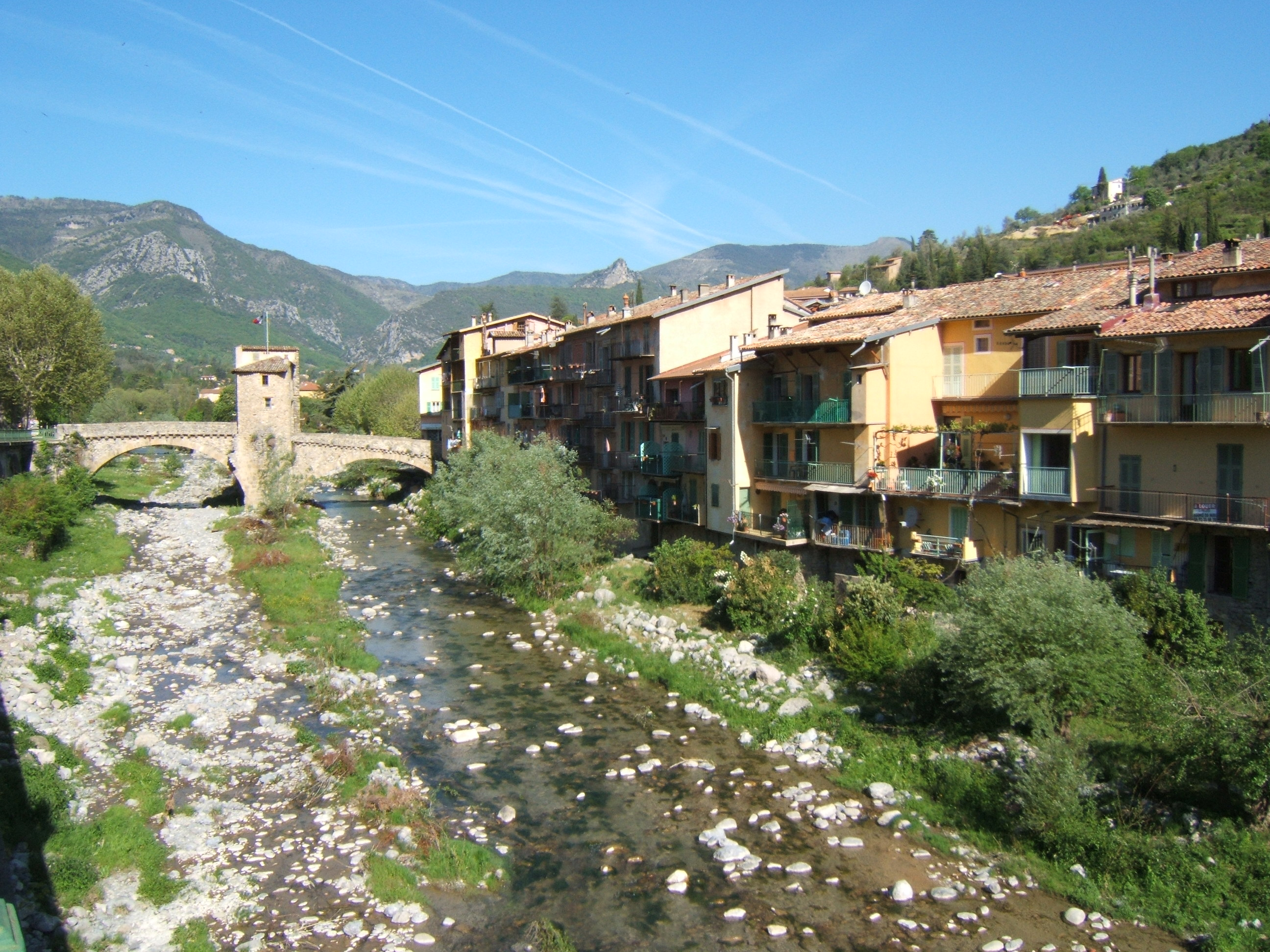
- A view of Sospel, with the River Bévéra flowing beneath the old bridge

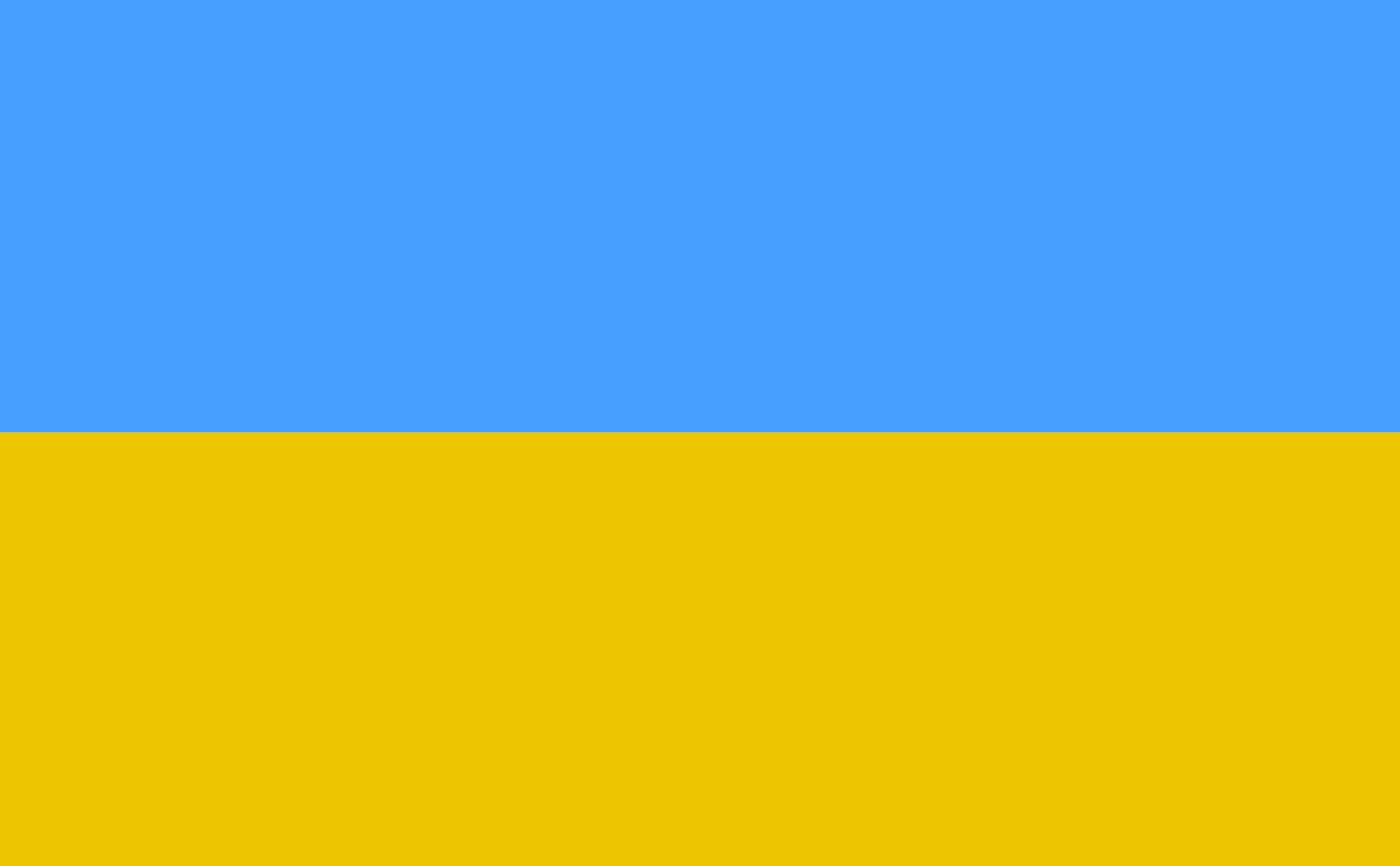
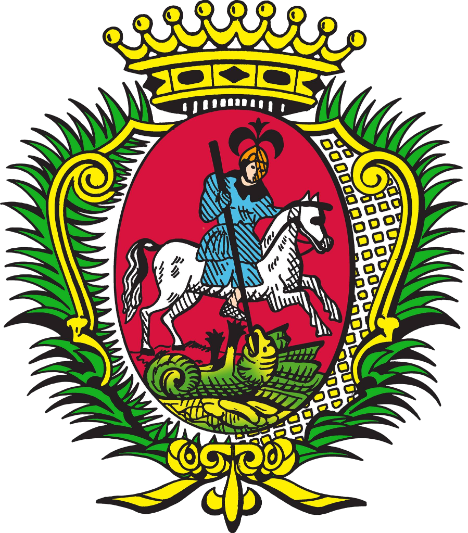
- Flag Coat of arms
- Location of Sospel
- Location within France Location within Provence-Alpes-Côte d'Azur
- Coordinates: 43°52′41″N 7°26′57″E
- Country: France
- Region: Provence-Alpes-Côte d'Azur
- Department: Alpes-Maritimes
- Arrondissement: Nice
- Canton: Contes
- Intercommunality: CA Riviera Française

Government
  - Mayor (2026–32): Christophe Brunengo
- Area^{1}: 62.39 km^{2} (24.09 sq mi)
- Elevation: 354 m (1,161 ft)
- Highest elevation: 1,737 m (5,699 ft)
- Lowest elevation: 257 m (843 ft)
- Population (2023): 3,791
  - Density: 60.76/km^{2} (157.4/sq mi)
- Time zone: UTC+01:00 (CET)
  - Summer (DST): UTC+02:00 (CEST)
- INSEE/Postal code: 06136 /06380
- ^{1} French Land Register data, which excludes lakes, ponds, glaciers > 1 km^{2} (0.386 sq mi or 247 acres) and river estuaries.

Sospel (French pronunciation: [sɔspɛl]; Mentonasc: Sospèl; Italian: Sospello) is a commune (municipality) and former schismatic episcopal seat (1381–1418) in the Alpes-Maritimes department in southeastern France near the Italian border and not far from Monte Carlo.

== History and remains ==
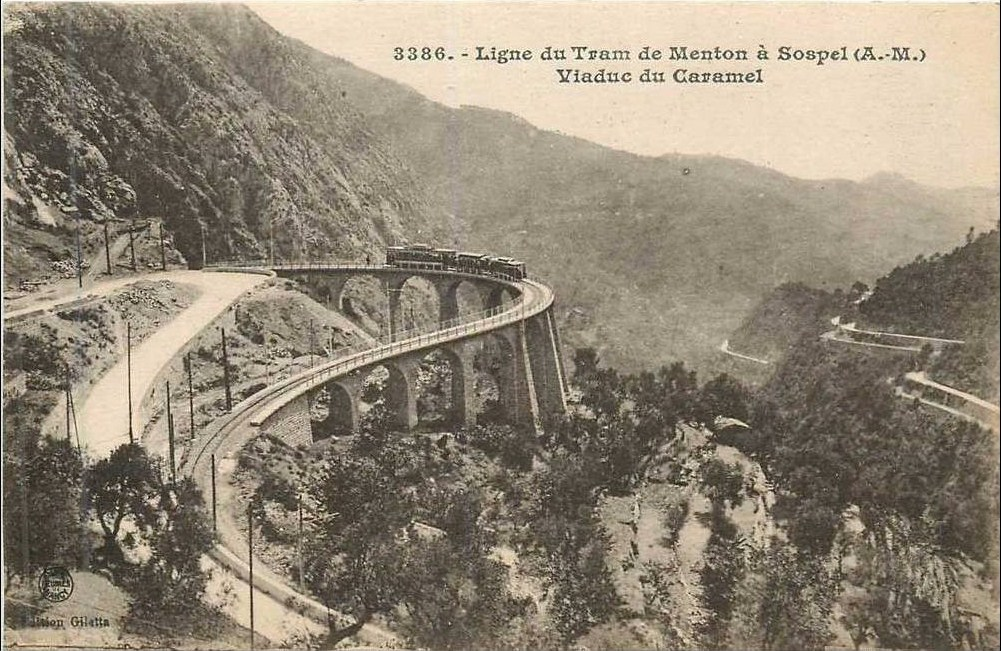
Tramway from Menton to Sospel

The town dates back to the 5th century, when it served as an important staging post on the royal road from Nice to Turin. Its main monument is the former cathedral.

- The old toll bridge used by travellers to cross the Bévéra, built in the 13th century, still stands. It was bombed by the Germans during World War II to prevent contact between the French Resistance ("The Maquis") and the Italians. Much of the town was destroyed. Renovated after World War II it now houses the tourist office.
- The ruins of a tower, part of a château (residential castle) belonging to the counts of Provence, are all that remain of the 14th century city walls.

From 1912 to 1932, Sospel had a tramway system from Menton which had a length of 17,279 meters.

== Ecclesiastical history ==
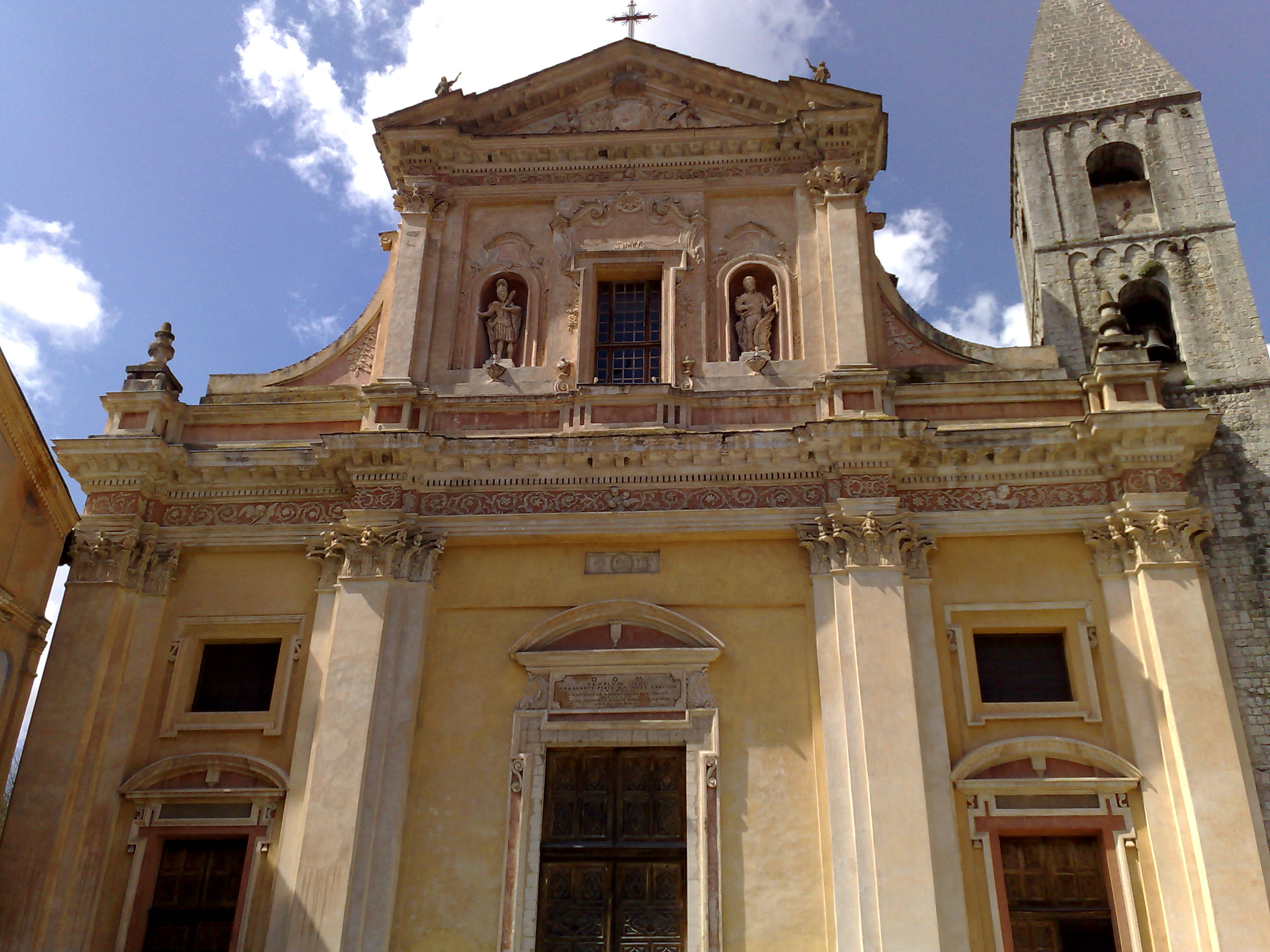
Sospel's former Cathedral

During the Western Schism, the Diocese of Ventimiglia (Vintimille in French) was split : the canonical bishop, still residing in Ventimiglia, obedient to the Pope in Rome, controlled the territories dependent of the Italian dogal Republic of Genoa, but an uncanonical line of rival anti-bishops (1381–1418), obedient to the Antipope of Avignon, established their schismatical see 'of Ventimiglia' in Sospel(lo), with sway over the diocese's 'French' territories dependent on the County of Savoy and the lordship of Tende.

Suffragan anti-bishops of (Ventimiglia at) Sospel(lo)

- Bertrando Imberti, Friars Minor (O.F.M. (2 December 1381 – death 1386)
- Pietro Marinaco, O.F.M. (27 August 1392 – 4 September 1409), next Bishop of Famagosta (on Cyprus, now a titular see as Famagusta)
- Bartolomeo de Giudici (22 June 1408 – deposed 1412 - death 1418)

After Ventimiglia's diocesan authority was restored in 1412 as the jurisdiction now known as the Diocese of Ventimiglia-San Remo, Sospel was assigned to what is now the Diocese of Nice, France, and its former cathedral was demoted to simple church.

== Population ==
Historical population

Year	Pop.	±% p.a.
1793	2,453	—
1800	2,990	+2.87%
1806	3,307	+1.69%
1822	3,620	+0.57%
1838	4,394	+1.22%
1848	4,437	+0.10%
1858	3,818	−1.49%
1861	3,936	+1.02%
1866	3,912	−0.12%
1872	3,547	−1.62%
1876	3,465	−0.58%
1881	3,425	−0.23%
1886	3,695	+1.53%
1891	3,887	+1.02%
1896	3,756	−0.68%
1901	3,570	−1.01%
1906	3,768	+1.09%

Year	Pop.	±% p.a.
1911	3,529	−1.30%
1921	3,361	−0.49%
1926	3,070	−1.79%
1931	3,705	+3.83%
1936	3,815	+0.59%
1946	2,156	−5.55%
1954	2,181	+0.14%
1962	2,321	+0.78%
1968	2,582	+1.79%
1975	1,828	−4.81%
1982	2,171	+2.49%
1990	2,592	+2.24%
1999	2,885	+1.20%
2007	3,514	+2.50%
2012	3,568	+0.31%
2017	3,831	+1.43%
2023	3,791	−0.17%

Source: EHESS and INSEE (1968-2023)

== Climate ==
Under the Köppen system, Sospel features an oceanic climate (Cfb) with warm-summer mediterranean climate (Csb) influences. Influenced by its low altitude, Sospel experiences light frosts in winter and cool nights during the summer.

Climate data for Sospel, Alpes-Maritimes, Alt : 387 m
Month	Jan	Feb	Mar	Apr	May	Jun	Jul	Aug	Sep	Oct	Nov	Dec	Year
Mean daily maximum °C (°F)	6.7 (44.1)	7.0 (44.6)	10.3 (50.5)	13.2 (55.8)	16.8 (62.2)	20.8 (69.4)	23.1 (73.6)	23.2 (73.8)	19.5 (67.1)	15.7 (60.3)	10.7 (51.3)	7.6 (45.7)	14.6 (58.2)
Daily mean °C (°F)	2.7 (36.9)	2.7 (36.9)	5.9 (42.6)	9.2 (48.6)	13.2 (55.8)	17.4 (63.3)	19.6 (67.3)	19.6 (67.3)	15.9 (60.6)	12.2 (54.0)	7.0 (44.6)	3.6 (38.5)	10.8 (51.4)
Mean daily minimum °C (°F)	−0.6 (30.9)	−1.3 (29.7)	1.6 (34.9)	4.9 (40.8)	8.9 (48.0)	13.0 (55.4)	15.4 (59.7)	15.5 (59.9)	12.1 (53.8)	8.8 (47.8)	3.7 (38.7)	0.3 (32.5)	6.9 (44.3)
Average precipitation mm (inches)	74 (2.9)	63 (2.5)	80 (3.1)	124 (4.9)	120 (4.7)	110 (4.3)	79 (3.1)	72 (2.8)	95 (3.7)	115 (4.5)	138 (5.4)	86 (3.4)	1,156 (45.3)
Source: climate-data.org

== Sospel in fiction ==
- The town of Sospel is mentioned in Daphne du Maurier's novel Rebecca, when Max de Winter declines an invitation from annoying social climber Mrs. Van Hopper on the excuse that he is driving to Sospel that day.
- In 1909 it was described in Gaston Leroux's novel, The Perfume of the Lady in Black (p. 151), as

"a picturesque little city lost between the last counterforces of the Alps, two hours and half from Mentone by coach... It is one of the most retired and quietest corners of France, the most dreaded by revenue officers and by the Alpine hunters. But the road which leads to it is one of the most beautiful in the world."

- Sospel is a setting in the 1977 mystery novel All Roads to Sospel by George Bellairs.

== See also ==
- List of Catholic dioceses in France
- List of medieval bridges in France
- Communes of the Alpes-Maritimes department

== Sources and external links ==
- GCatholic - former (anti-)bishopric
- GCatholic, with Google satellite photo-map - St.Michael's church, the former Sospel cathedral
