= Languages of France =

- Languages and dialects of metropolitan France
- Official: French
- Regional: Metropolitan France; Alsatian, Catalan, Basque, Corsican, Breton, Gallo, Norman, Picard, Walloon, Frainc-Comtou, Poitevin–Saintongeais, Champenois, Lorrain, Occitan, West Flemish, Franco-Provençal, Yenish, Lorraine Franconian; Overseas France; French Guiana Creole, Guadeloupean Creole, Martinican Creole, Réunion Creole, Shimaore, New Caledonian languages, West Uvean, Wallisian, Futunan, Tahitian, Marquesan, Maroon creoles and Amerindian languages of French Guiana
- Immigrant: Arabic, Portuguese, Spanish, Italian, German, Polish, Berber, Turkish, English, Vietnamese
- Foreign: English (39%); Spanish (13%); German (6%)
- Signed: French Sign Language
- Keyboard layout: AZERTY, BÉPO

French is the sole official language in France according to the second article of the French Constitution. French, a Gallo-Romance language, is spoken by nearly the entire population of France.

In addition to French, several regional languages are also spoken to varying degrees, such as Alsatian, an Alemannic variety (spoken by 1.44% of the national population); Basque, a language isolate; Breton, a Celtic language (spoken by 0.61%); Corsican, an Italo-Dalmatian language; and various other Gallo-Romance languages (Langues d'oïl 1.25%, Occitan 1.33%). Some of these languages are also spoken in neighbouring countries, such as Belgium, Germany, Switzerland, Italy, Andorra, or Spain.

== Status ==
The official language of the French Republic is French (art. 2 of the French Constitution) and the French government is, by law, compelled to communicate primarily in French. The government, furthermore, mandates that commercial advertising be available in French (though it can also use other languages). The French government does not otherwise mandate the use of French by private individuals or corporations or in any other media.

A revision of the French constitution creating official recognition of regional languages was implemented by the Parliament in Congress at Versailles in July 2008.

The 1999 Report written for the government by Bernard Cerquiglini identified 75 languages that would qualify for recognition under the government's proposed ratification of the European Charter for Regional or Minority Languages. Of those languages, 24 are indigenous to the European territory of the state while all the others are from overseas areas of the French Republic (in the Caribbean, Indian Ocean, Pacific Ocean and South America).

Although ratification was blocked by the Constitutional Council as contradicting the Fifth Republic's constitutional provision enshrining French as the language of the Republic, the government continues to recognise regional and minority languages to a limited extent (i.e. without granting them official status) and the Délégation générale à la langue française has acquired the additional function of observing and studying the languages of France and has had et aux langues de France added to its title. The category of languages of France (in French: langues de France) is thus administratively recognised even if this does not go so far as to provide any official status. Following his election as president, François Hollande reasserted in 2012 his campaign platform to ratify the European Charter and ensure a clear legal framework for regional languages (within a programme of administrative decentralisation that would give competencies to the regions in language policy).

The regional languages of France are sometimes called patois, but this term (roughly meaning "dialects") is often considered derogatory. Patois is used to refer to essentially oral languages, even though some have a current and/or historical use, such as Occitan, which was already being written at a time when French was not and its literature has continued to thrive, with a Nobel Prize for Frédéric Mistral in 1904.

It is estimated that at the time of the French Revolution in 1789, only half of the population of France could speak French, and as late as 1871 only a quarter spoke French as their native language.

=== Language education ===
The topic of the teaching of regional languages in public primary and secondary schools is controversial. Proponents of the measure state that it would be necessary for the preservation of those languages and to show respect to the local culture. Opponents contend that local languages are often non-standardised (thus making curricula difficult), of dubious practical usefulness (since most are spoken by a small number of people, without any sizable corpus of publications) and that the curriculum and funding of public schools are already too strained. The topic also leads to wider controversial questions of autonomy of the régions. Regarding other languages, English, Spanish, Italian and German are the most commonly studied foreign languages in French schools.

In April 2001, the Minister of Education, Jack Lang, stated formally that "Depuis plus de deux siècles, les pouvoirs politiques ont combattu les langues régionales", ie for more than two centuries, the political powers of the French government had repressed regional languages, and announced that bilingual education would, for the first time, be recognised, and bilingual teachers recruited in French public schools.

=== Cross-border languages ===
Some of the languages of France are also cross-border languages (for example, Basque, Catalan, Corsican, Dutch, Franc-Comtois, Franco-Provençal, Norman, Picard, Occitan and others), some of which enjoy a recognised or official status in the respective neighbouring state or territory. French itself is also a cross-border language, being spoken in neighbouring Andorra, Belgium, Italy, Luxembourg, Monaco, and Switzerland.

== List of languages ==
Mother tongues of the French population (2007 AES)
1. French (87.2%)
2. Arabic (3.60%)
3. Portuguese (1.50%)
4. Spanish (1.20%)
5. Italian (1.00%)
6. German (0.70%)
7. Turkish (0.50%)
8. English (0.40%)
9. Other languages (3.90%)

According to the 2007 Adult Education survey, part of a project by the European Union and carried in France by the Insee and based on a sample of 15,350 people, French was the mother tongue of 87.2% of the total population, or roughly 55.81 million people, followed by Arabic (3.6%, 2.3 million), Portuguese (1.5%, 960,000), Spanish (1.2%, 770,000) and Italian (1.0%, 640,000). People who spoke other languages natively made up the remaining 5.2% of the population.

=== National language ===
- French

=== Regional languages ===
The regional languages of Metropolitan France include:

==== Celtic ====
- Breton (Brezhoneg)
  - Léonard (Leoneg)
  - Cornouaillais (Kerneveg)
  - Trégorrois (Tregerieg)
  - Vannetais (Gwenedeg)

==== Germanic ====
- Alsatian (Elsässerditsch)
- West Flemish (West-Vlams)
- Lorraine Franconian (Lothringisch)
- Yenish (Jenisch)
- Yiddish

==== Italo-Dalmatian ====
- Corsican (Corsu)

==== Gallo-Romance ====
- Oïl language:
  - Berrichon
  - Bourguignon-Morvandiau
  - Champenois or Campanois
  - Franc-Comtois
  - French
  - Gallo
  - Lorrain
  - Norman
  - Picard
  - Poitevin-Saintongeais
  - Walloon
  - Angevin
- Occitan language (also Lenga d'òc, Langue d'oc):
  - Vivaroalpenc
    - Mentonasc (Mentonnais or Mentonasque)
  - Auvergnat
  - Gascon including Béarnese (Béarnais) and Landese (Landais)
  - Languedocien
  - Limousin
  - Provençal
    - Nissart (Niçois or Niçart)
- Catalan
- Franco-Provençal (also Arpitan):
  - Bressan
  - Dauphinois
  - Forézien
  - Jurassien
  - Lyonnais
  - Savoyard
- Gallo Italic
  - Ligurian language
    - Royasc

==== Others ====
- Basque (Euskara)
- Romani

=== Overseas languages ===
There are also several languages spoken in France's overseas areas (see Administrative divisions of France for details):

- Amerindian languages in French Guiana
- French-based creole languages in the French West Indies (Guadeloupe, Martinique, Saint Martin, and Saint Barthélemy), French Guiana, and Réunion (see: Antillean Creole, Haitian Creole, French Guiana Creole and Réunion Creole);
  - also Dutch, and English in Saint Martin;
  - also Saint-Barths Patois (local derivation from regional dialects of French in France), and English in Saint Barthélemy
- Many Austronesian languages:
  - several languages in New Caledonia (see: New Caledonian languages, Loyalty Island languages)
  - two languages in Wallis & Futuna (see: Wallisian language, Futunan language)
  - many languages in French Polynesia (Tahitian and other Eastern Polynesian languages)
  - Shibushi in Mayotte
- Shimaore (a Bantu language) in Mayotte

=== Sign language ===
French Sign Language is also recognised as a language of France (with at least one regional variant in Provence).

=== Immigrant languages ===
A large number of immigrant languages are spoken in France, with a handful having a significant number of home speakers. (Figures as of 2000)

==== Main immigrant languages ====
- Arabic, especially the Maghrebi Arabic dialects, is the second-most common language in French homes, with several million speakers.
- Berber languages from North Africans are one of the most spoken languages in France, about 2,200,000 speakers.
- Italian: spoken by Italian communities in many major French cities, especially in southern regions, such as Nice, Savoie, and Corsica. About 790,000 speakers, excluding Italian dialects.
- Portuguese: spoken by about 700,000 people.
- English: significant British minorities in Aquitaine and Brittany, as well as commuters working in the UK but living in Nord-Pas-de-Calais. Dispersed minorities in Paris and on the Côte d'Azur (French Riviera). The most widely taught foreign language in the French education system, but not widely used and understood except in specific job positions (chiefly technical and tourism). About 325,000 home speakers.
- Polish: spoken by about 130,000 people
- Tamil: spoken by about 125,000 people
- Armenian: spoken by about 486,000 people
- Turkish: spoken by about 221,000 people
- Vietnamese: the most spoken Asian language in France, spoken by about 324,000 people
- German and German dialects: spoken by about 300,000 people. Figure includes both standard German and other dialects of High German. See Alsatian and Lorraine Franconian, spoken respectively in Alsace and Lorraine.
- Kurdish languages – 200,000 (2014 estimate)

== Statistics ==
=== INSEE 1999 ===
At the 1999 census, INSEE sampled 380,000 adult people all across Metropolitan France, and asked them questions about their family situation. One of the questions was about the languages that their parents spoke with them before the age of five. This is the first time serious statistics were computed about the proportion of mother tongues in France. The results were published in Enquête familiale, Insee, 1999.

Here is a list of the nine most prominent mother tongues in France based on Enquête familiale.

Rank	Language	Mother tongue	Percentage of adult population
1	French	39,360,000	86% (note that this figure is an underestimate because people under 18 years of age were not surveyed; see note #2 below the table)
2	German dialects (Alsatian, Lorraine Franconian, etc.)	970,000 (of whom Alsatian: 660,000; standard German: 210,000; Lorraine Franconian: 100,000)	2.12% (of whom Alsatian: 1.44%; standard German: 0.46%; Lorraine Franconian: 0.22%)
3	Maghrebi Arabic	940,000	2.05%
4	Occitan (Languedocian, Gascon, Provençal, etc.)	610,000 (another 1,060,000 had some exposure)	1.33% (another 2.32% had some exposure, see notes)
5	Portuguese	580,000	1.27%
6	Oïl languages (Picard, Gallo, Poitevin, Saintongeais, etc.)	570,000 (another 850,000 had some exposure)	1.25% (another 1.86% had some exposure, see notes)
7	Italian, Corsican and Ligurian (Monegasque)	540,000	1.19%
8	Spanish	485,000	1.06%
9	Breton	280,000 (another 405,000 had some exposure)	0.61% (another 0.87% had some exposure, see notes)
10	About 400 other languages: Polish, Berber languages, East Asian languages, Catalan, Franco-Provençal, Basque, West Flemish, etc., as well as those who gave no response	2,350,000 (of whom English: 115,000)	5.12% (of whom English: 0.25% of total adult population)
	Total	45,762,000 (46,680,000 including those with two mother tongues who were counted twice)	102% (2% of people have both French and another language as their mother tongue, thus, they are counted twice)

When the people with mother tongue and people with some exposure to the language before the age of five (see note #3 below) are added together, the five most widely spoken languages in metropolitan France are (note that the percentages add up to more than 100, because many bilingual people are now counted twice):

- French: 42,100,000 (92%)
- Occitan: 1,670,000 (3.65%)
- German and German dialects: 1,440,000 (3.15%)
- Oïl languages (excl. French): 1,420,000 (3.10%)
- Arabic: 1,170,000 (2.55%)

==== Notes on the table ====
1. The data in the table are about mother tongues, and not about actual language practice. It states that 14% of the adult people living in France in 1999 were born and raised up to the age of 5 in families that spoke only (or predominantly) some other languages than French. It does not mean that 14% of adult people in France spoke some other languages than French in 1999.
2. Only adults (i.e. 18 years and older) were surveyed. This means that French people born between 1981 and 1999 are not included in the survey. The mother tongue of the younger generations is more predominantly French than is the case with the older generations because, as the Enquête familiale survey explains, regional and immigrant language transmission decreases dramatically with each new generation, as French replaces the regional and immigrant languages. In the Enquête familiale survey, only 35% of parents whose mother tongue was a regional or immigrant language reported that they spoke that language to their children. Thus, the 86% figure of people with French as their mother tongue is an underestimate because the younger generations whose predominant mother tongue is French are not counted.
3. The concept of "mother tongue" may not give a complete idea of the phenomenon of minority languages in France. This is because there are many people who were born and raised in families in which parents spoke to them only (or predominantly) French, but in which some regional or immigration languages were also occasionally used. One example: while the data shows that 610,000 adults in 1999 had one of the Occitan dialects as their mother tongue, the survey also found out that another 1,060,000 adults were born and raised in families in which one of the Occitan dialects was occasionally spoken. Some of these 1,060,000 people may speak Occitan as fluently as the 610,000 people who have it as a mother tongue, while some other (the majority, probably) have only a limited knowledge of Occitan. That 1,670,000 adults are speakers of Occitan cannot be corroborated, but it may be the case that the total number of people with some form of exposure to Occitan is higher than the 610,000 figure, though some of may have stopped using the language altogether since then.

=== Ethnologue, Metropolitan France ===
The following languages are listed as having 50,000 or more total speakers in Metropolitan France according to the 2022 edition of Ethnologue. Entries identified by Ethnologue as macrolanguages (such as Arabic, Persian, Malay, Pashto, and Chinese, encompassing all their respective varieties) are not included in this section.

Languages of Metropolitan France, Ethnologue (25th ed., 2022) (Note: Only languages with at least 50,000 speakers are shown.)
Language	Family	Branch	First-language (L1) speakers in France	Second-language (L2) speakers in France	Total (L1+L2) speakers in France
Alsatian	Indo-European	Germanic			900,000
Algerian Arabic	Afro-Asiatic	Semitic			1,350,000
Moroccan Arabic	Afro-Asiatic	Semitic			1,140,000
Tunisian Arabic	Afro-Asiatic	Semitic			447,000
Western Armenian	Indo-European	Armenian			70,000
Arpitan	Indo-European	Romance			150,000
Basque	Isolate	—N/a			72,000
Breton	Indo-European	Celtic			206,000
Catalan	Indo-European	Romance			126,000
Corsican	Indo-European	Romance			150,000
English	Indo-European	Germanic	236,000	26,200,000	26,436,000
French	Indo-European	Romance	62,400,000	1,500,000	63,900,000
French Sign Language	Francosign	—N/a			100,000
Standard German	Indo-European	Germanic		4,000,000	4,000,000
Italian	Indo-European	Romance			829,000
Kabyle	Afro-Asiatic	Berber			537,000
Khmer	Austroasiatic	Mon–Khmer			50,000
Lesser Antillean French Creole	Indo-European	Romance			150,000
Lorraine Franconian	Indo-European	Germanic			400,000
Occitan	Indo-European	Romance			110,000
Picard	Indo-European	Romance			500,000
Portuguese	Indo-European	Romance			959,000
Spanish	Indo-European	Romance	461,000	5,990,000	6,451,000
Central Atlas Tamazight	Afro-Asiatic	Berber			150,000
Tamil	Dravidian	Southern			125,000
Turkish	Turkic	Oghuz			444,000

== See also ==
- Culture of France
- Francophonie
- French language in Canada
- Gaulish
- History of French
- Languages of the European Union
- Law French
- Old Frankish
- Old French
- Old Occitan
- Ordinance of Villers-Cotterêts
