= Monte Colombin =

Mountain in Italy

- Location within Alps

Highest point
- Elevation: 1,088 m (3,570 ft)
- Coordinates: 43°54′03″N 7°33′47″E

Geography
- Location: Liguria, Italy; Provence-Alpes-Côte d'Azur, France
- Parent range: Ligurian Alps

Monte Colombin is a mountain in Liguria, northern Italy, part of the Alps. It is located in the provinces of province of Imperia in Italy and Alpes-Maritimes in France. It lies at an elevation of 1,088 meters.

== SOIUSA classification ==
According to the SOIUSA (International Standardized Mountain Subdivision of the Alps) the mountain can be classified in the following way:

- main part = Western Alps
- major sector = South Western Alps
- section = Ligurian Alps
- subsection = Alpi del Marguareis
- supergroup = Catena del Saccarello
- group = Gruppo del Monte Saccarello
- subgroup = Costiera del Monte Pietra Vecchia
- code = I/A-1.II-A.1.f

== Access to the summit ==
The mountain can be easily accessed from Airole, Olivetta San Michele, Breil-sur-Roya and Rocchetta Nervina.
