= Mentonasc dialect =

Transitional dialect between the Occitan language and the Ligurian language

Mentonasc
- Mentonnais, Mentonasque, Mentonasco
- Native to: France, Italy
- Region: Menton, Roquebrune (País Mentonasc)
- Native speakers: 4,000 (2007); 3,000 in Menton & 1,000 in Roquebrune
- Language family: Indo-European: Italic; Latino-Faliscan; Romance; Italo-Western; Western Romance; Gallo-Romance; Occitano-Romance; Occitan; Provençal?; Vivaro-Alpine; Mentonasc
- Dialects: Roquebrunasq

Language codes
- ISO 639-3: –
- Occitan: mentonasc

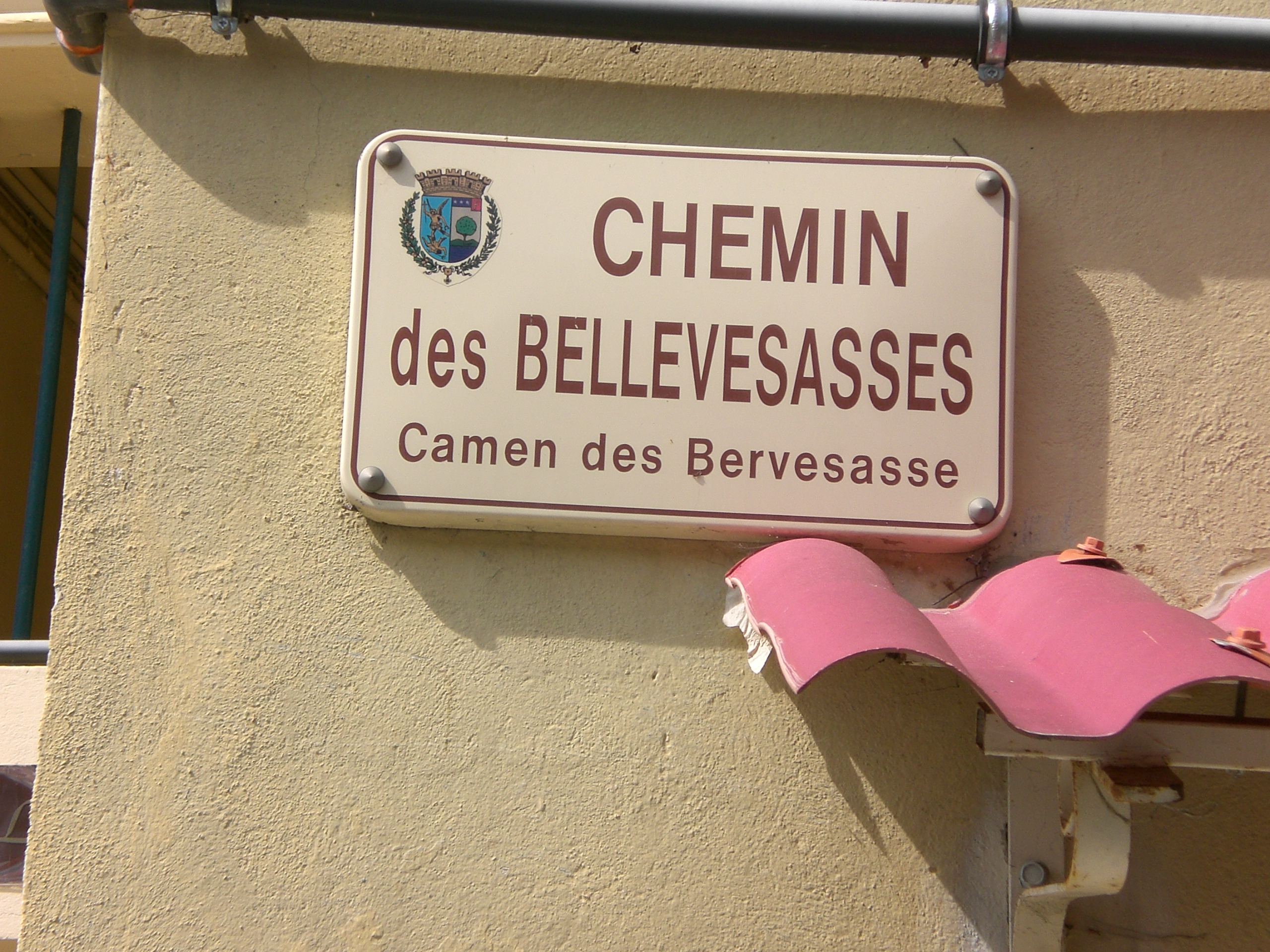
A Street sign written in Mentonasc

Mentonasc (Occitan pronunciation: [me(n)tuˈnaʃk]; Mentonasco in Italian, Mentonnais [mɑ̃tɔnɛ] or Mentonasque [mɑ̃tɔnask] in French) is a Romance dialect historically spoken in and around Menton, France. It is classified as a dialect of Occitan and a sub-dialect of Vivaro-Alpine, with strong influence from the neighbouring Intemelian Ligurian dialect spoken from Ventimiglia to San Remo.

== Classification ==
Mentonasc is considered to be a transitional language; it is an intermediate language between Occitan and Ligurian, which is why the classification of Mentonasc is often debated. However, it is traditionally assigned to the Occitan language but Italian nationalists consider it part of the Ligurian dialects.

The Mentonasc dialect bears strong similarities with the common alpine dialects, such as, Royasque or Pignasque. It differs quite significantly especially in the ear from Ligurian coastal dialects (Northern Italian), like those of Ventimiglia (Intemelio dialect) or Monaco (Monégasque dialect).

== History ==
When the area of Menton was part of the Kingdom of Sardinia, Mentonasc was used in all of the coastal area between Monaco and Ventimiglia, and in the hinterland.

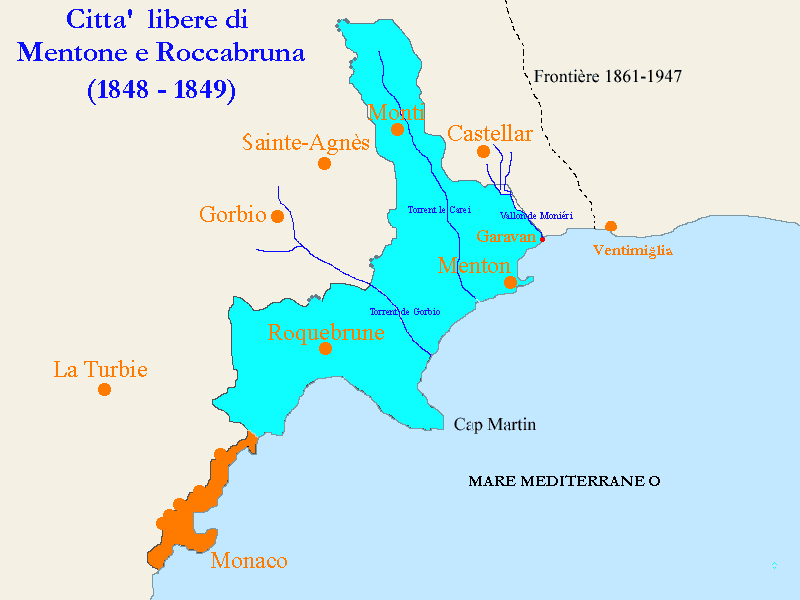
Map of the territory of the "Free cities of Menton & Roquebrune in 1848

In the 19th century Mentonasc was used in the territories of the Free Cities of Menton and Roquebrune, an independent statelet created in connection with the Italian Risorgimento.

When France annexed the Free Cities in 1861, Mentonasc began its decline, substituted by the French language.

== Geographic distribution ==
The Mentonasc dialect is currently spoken by about 10% of the population in Menton, Roquebrune, and the surrounding villages (Castellar, Castillon, Gorbio, Sainte-Agnès, Moulinet and Sospel) in an area called the País Mentonasc. Now the language is being taught within the French educational system, as a variety of Niçard (i.e. Provençal and Occitan), so this may change.

=== Official status ===
No countries currently have Mentonasc as an official language.

== Vocabulary ==
Below is a chart of some nouns and verbs found in French, translated into Mentonasc.

French	Mentonasc
accôtement	bor dou camen, riba (n.f.)
accouchement	part (n.m.)
accoucher	partouri (v.)
accoucheuse	baila, couchusa, coumà (n.f.)
accouder	acoudâ, pountelâ (v.)
accoudoir	bras (n.m.)
accouplement	acoubiament (n.m.)
accoupler	acoubiâ (v.)
accourir	veni vitou (v.)
accoutrer	gimbrâ, arnesca (v.)
accoutumer	acousturiâ, abituâ (v.)
accrediter	acreditâ (v.)
accroc	set (n.m.), sgarahura(n.f.) (de langage) :sgarran (n.m.)
accrocher	acrouchâ, pendè, aganità (v.)
accroissement	creishament (n.m.)
accroitre	creishe (v.)
accroupir	acougounâ, cougounà (v.)
accueil	acueilh (n.m.)
accueillir	aculhi (v.)
acculer	aculà (v.)
accumulateur	acumulatoù (n.m.)
accumulation	amourounament, acumulacian (n.m.)
accumuler	amourounà, acumulà (v.)
accuser	acusà (v.)
acerbe	pougnent, aspre (adj.)
aceré	pounchû (adj.)
achalander	ashalandà (v.)
acharnement	acharnament (n.m.)
acharner	encagnâ, acharnâ (v.)
achat	acat (n.m.), coumpra (n.f.)
acheminer	encaminà, stradâ, adraiâ, enstradà (v.)
acheter	acatà, catà (v.)
achever	feni (v.)
acide	aigre (adj.) âchidou (n.m.; adj)
acidité	aigrou, aigrura, achidità (nf)
acolyte	coumpars (n.m.)
acompte	acuenti (n.m.)
acoquiner	s’acouquinà (v.)
acoustique	acoustica (n.f.), acousticou (adj.)
acquérir	catâ, aquistà (v.)
acquisition	aquîst (n.m.)
acquitter	aquitâ, pagà (v.)
âcre	àsperou (adj.)
acrobate	acroubat (n.m.)
acropole	acroupolà (n.f.)
acte	atou (n.m.)
acteur (trice)	atoû (n.m.), atrisse (n.f.)
actif	ativou (adj.)
action	assian (n.f.)
actionner	assiounâ (v.)
activité	atività (n.f.)
actualité	atualitâ (n.f.)

== Literature ==
There are some texts and songs that have been published recently in Menton (most from the twentieth century.)

Among the various publications: A Lambrusca de Paigran (la Vigne vierge de Grand-père) by Jean-Louis Caserio, illustrations by M. and F. Guglielmelli, SAHM, Menton, 1987. Brandi Mentounasc, Livret de Poésies Bilingue by Jean Ansaldi, 2010. Ou Mentounasc per ou Bachelerà, le Mentonasque au Baccalauréat, by JL Caserio, 5th edition, 2008., etc.

== Examples ==
Video of the Local Anthem of Menton being sung in Mentonasc

Another video of the Local Anthem (Hymne de Menton) with words, accompanied by folk dancing.

Video showcasing the Mentonasc language with the Ligurian orthographic spelling.
