= Brenno =

Brenno may refer to:

== Places ==
- Brenno (river), a Swiss river
- Brenno, Poland, a Polish town

== People ==
- Brenno Del Giudice (1888–1957), Italian rower and architect
- Brenno Ambrosini (born 1967), Italian pianist
- Brenno de Winter (born 1971), Dutch journalist
- Brenno (footballer) (born 1999), Brazilian footballer

== Other uses ==
- Brennus, Enemy of Rome, a 1963 Italian film
- Academia Ligustica do Brenno, an Italian society based on maintaining the Genoese language

== See also ==
- Brennus, Gaulish chieftains
