= Brigasc dialect =

Ligurian dialect of France and Italy

Brigasc
- brigasc
- Native to: Italy, France
- Native speakers: (undated figure of 1,000)
- Language family: Indo-European: Romance; Western; Gallo-Romance; Gallo-Italic; Ligurian; Brigasc

Language codes
- ISO 639-3: –
- Glottolog: None
- Linguasphere: 51-AAA-og

Brigasc is a dialect of the Ligurian language. It is spoken in Italy and France.

== Area of use ==
The Brigasc dialect is spoken in La Brigue (France) and Briga Alta (Italy) and some villages of the communes of Ormea and Triora. It is very close to Royasc dialect.

== History ==
During the Renaissance the Ligurian language was spoken in all the territories of the Republic of Genoa: in the western area of this republic one of its groups (spoken mainly in the area between the Principality of Monaco and Sanremo) was called Intemelio.

The language spoken in the mountains around Briga was called Brigasc and received some influence from the Occitan language.

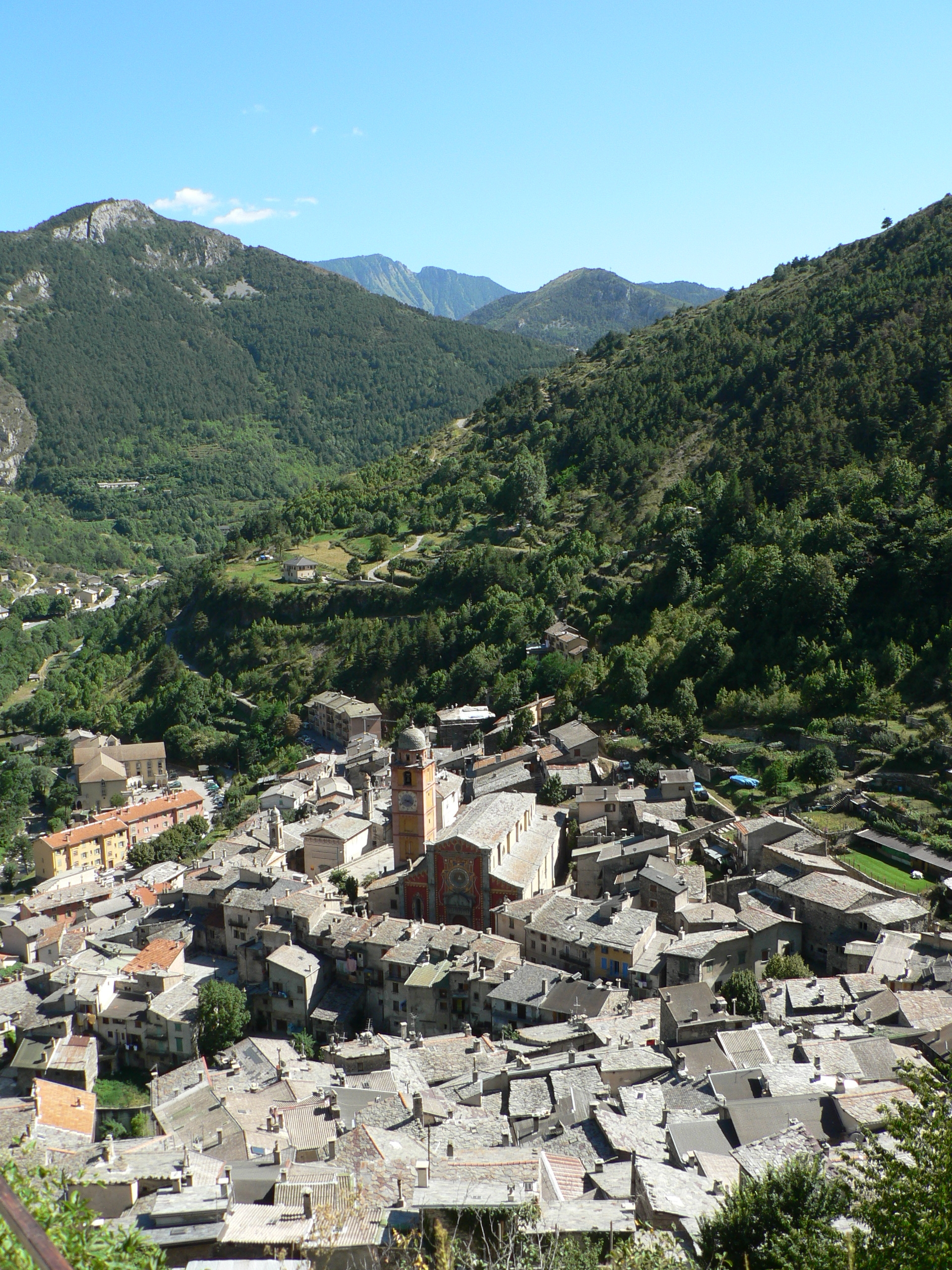
Tenda is one of the alpine areas where Brigasc is still spoken

== Some words in Brigasc ==
Occitan	Brigasc	Ligurian	Italian	English
labrena	labrena / cansëneštr	salamandra/scilvestru	salamandra	salamander
lhauç	jlaus o žlaus	lampu	lampo	flash
besson, gemel	'binèe	binélu	gemello	twin
grolla	'causée/cuusée	scarpa	scarpa	shoe
faudilh, faudal	fudìi	scussà	grembiule	
ren	ren	ninte - nièn	niente	nothing
quauquarren	cücren	cuarcosa - carcosa	qualcosa	something
luenh	lögn	luntàn	lontano	far
a raitz	arè	du tüttu	completamente	totally
Deineal, Chalendas	Dëneàa	Natale - Neà - Denâ	Natale	Christmas
bealera	beàa/bearera	béu	canaletto	
agulha	agüglia/agüya	aguggia	ago	needle
mai	ciü - mai	ciü	più	more
c(l)han, pl(h)an	cian	ciàn	piano	
fl(h)or	sciu(u)	sciùa	fiore	flower
cl(h)au	ciau	ciave	chiave	key
uelh	ögl/öy	öggiu	occhio	eye
pont	pont	punte	ponte	bridge
pòrc	porc	porcu	maiale	pig
muralha, mur	muragn	meàia/miâgia	muro	wall
escoba	dëvìa	spasùia/spasuìa	scopa	broom
sentièr	dëraira	senté	sentiero	path
fea, feia	fea	pégua	pecora	sheep
abelha	abeglia/abeya	ava/avia	ape	bee
aret	aré	mutòn/muntun	montone	ram
volp, rainard	vurp / rinard	gurpe/vurpe	volpe	fox
singlar	sëngriée	cinghiale	cinghiale	boar
ruaa	ruà	burgà	borgata	
femna, molher	femna	muié/mugê/dona	moglie	woman
òme	om	maìu/mâiu	marito	husband
marrit, chaitiu	marì	gramu	cattivo	

== See also ==
- Mentonasque
- Intemelio
- Ligurian language

== Bibliography ==
- Fiorenzo Toso, Il brigasco e l'olivettese tra classificazione scientifica e manipolazioni politico-amministrative, in Intemelion. Cultura e territorio – Quaderno annuale di studi storici dell'Accademia di cultura intemelia, n. 14, anno 2008; website online (in Italian)
