= Olivetta San Michele =

Olivetta San Michele Auřivéta San Michèe
- Comune
- Comune di Olivetta San Michele
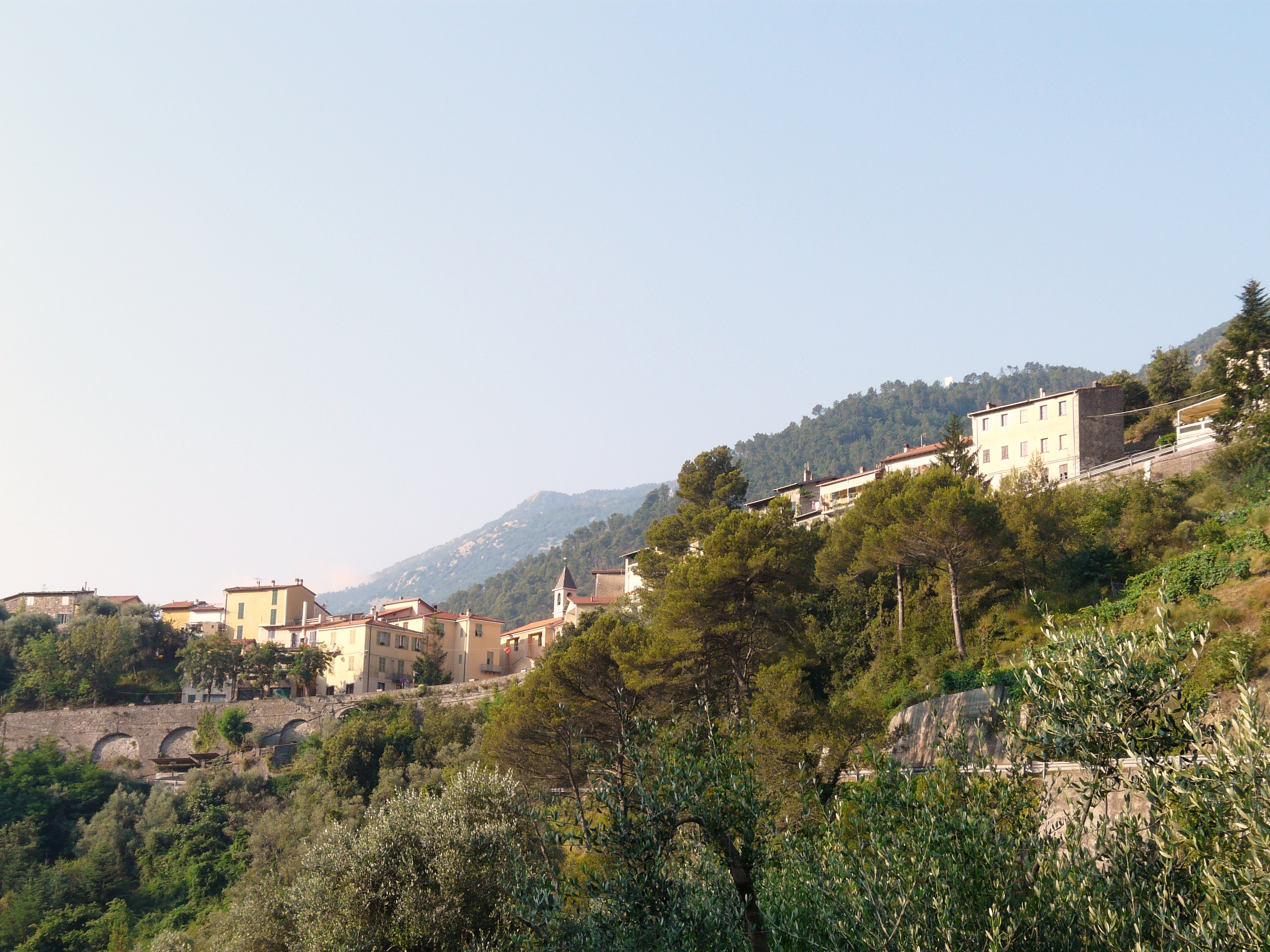
- View of Olivetta San Michele

- Coat of arms

- Location within Italy Location within Liguria
- Coordinates: 43°53′N 7°31′E
- Country: Italy
- Region: Liguria
- Province: Province of Imperia (IM)

Area
  - Total: 13.8 km^{2} (5.3 sq mi)

Population (Dec. 2004)
  - Total: 245
  - Density: 17.8/km^{2} (46.0/sq mi)
- Time zone: UTC+1 (CET)
  - Summer (DST): UTC+2 (CEST)
- Postal code: 18030
- Dialing code: 0184

Olivetta San Michele (Royasc: Auřivéta San Michèe, also Ligurian: Aoriveta) is a comune (municipality) in the Province of Imperia in the Italian region Liguria, located about 130 kilometres (81 mi) southwest of Genoa and about 40 kilometres (25 mi) west of Imperia, on the border with France. As of 31 December 2004, it had a population of 245 and an area of 13.8 square kilometres (5.3 mi^{2}).

== Geography ==
Olivetta San Michele borders the following municipalities: Airole, Breil-sur-Roya (France), Castellar (France), and Ventimiglia.

== Demographic evolution ==
Historical population

Year	Pop.	±%
1861	951	—
1871	978	+2.8%
1881	959	−1.9%
1901	773	−19.4%
1911	674	−12.8%

Year	Pop.	±%
1921	659	−2.2%
1931	540	−18.1%
1936	564	+4.4%
1951	530	−6.0%
1961	462	−12.8%

Year	Pop.	±%
1971	334	−27.7%
1981	304	−9.0%
1991	301	−1.0%
2001	238	−20.9%

Source: Data from ISTAT
