= Communauté d'agglomération de la Riviera Française =

Riviera Française
- Communauté d'agglomération
- Interactive map of Riviera Française
- Coordinates: 43°50′N 07°28′E
- Country: France
- Region: Provence-Alpes-Côte d'Azur
- Department: Alpes-Maritimes
- No. of communes: {{{nbcomm}}}
- Established: 2002
- Area: 660.1 km^{2} (254.9 sq mi)
- Population (2019): 73,890
  - Density: 111.9/km^{2} (289.9/sq mi)
- Website: www.riviera-francaise.fr

Communauté d'agglomération de la Riviera Française is the communauté d'agglomération, an intercommunal structure, centred on the town of Menton. It is located in the Alpes-Maritimes department, in the Provence-Alpes-Côte d'Azur region, southeastern France. Created in 2002, its seat is in Menton. Its area is 660.1 km^{2}. Its population was 73,890 in 2019, of which 30,525 in Menton proper.

== Composition ==
The communauté d'agglomération consists of the following 15 communes:

1. Beausoleil
2. Breil-sur-Roya
3. La Brigue
4. Castellar
5. Castillon
6. Fontan
7. Gorbio
8. Menton
9. Moulinet
10. Roquebrune-Cap-Martin
11. Sainte-Agnès
12. Saorge
13. Sospel
14. Tende
15. La Turbie
