= Canton of Menton =

Coordinates: 43.78°N 7.50°E

Menton
- Canton
- Interactive map of Menton
- Country: France
- Region: Provence-Alpes-Côte d'Azur
- Department: Alpes-Maritimes
- No. of communes: {{{nbcomm}}}

Government
  - Representatives (2021–2028): Gabrielle Bineau; Patrick Cesari
- Area: 59.52 km^{2} (22.98 sq mi)
- Population (2023): 47,051
  - Density: 790.5/km^{2} (2,047/sq mi)
- INSEE code: 06 14

The canton of Menton is an administrative division of the Alpes-Maritimes department, southeastern France. It was created at the French canton reorganisation which came into effect in March 2015. Its seat is in Menton.

== Composition ==
It consists of the following communes:

1. Castellar
2. Castillon
3. Gorbio
4. Menton
5. Roquebrune-Cap-Martin
6. Sainte-Agnès

== Councillors ==
| Election | Councillors | Party | Occupation |
|---|---|---|---|
| 2015 | Patrick Cesari | LR | Mayor of Roquebrune-Cap-Martin |
| 2015 | Colette Giudicelli | LR | Member of the French Senate representing Alpes-Maritimes |

== Pictures of the canton ==
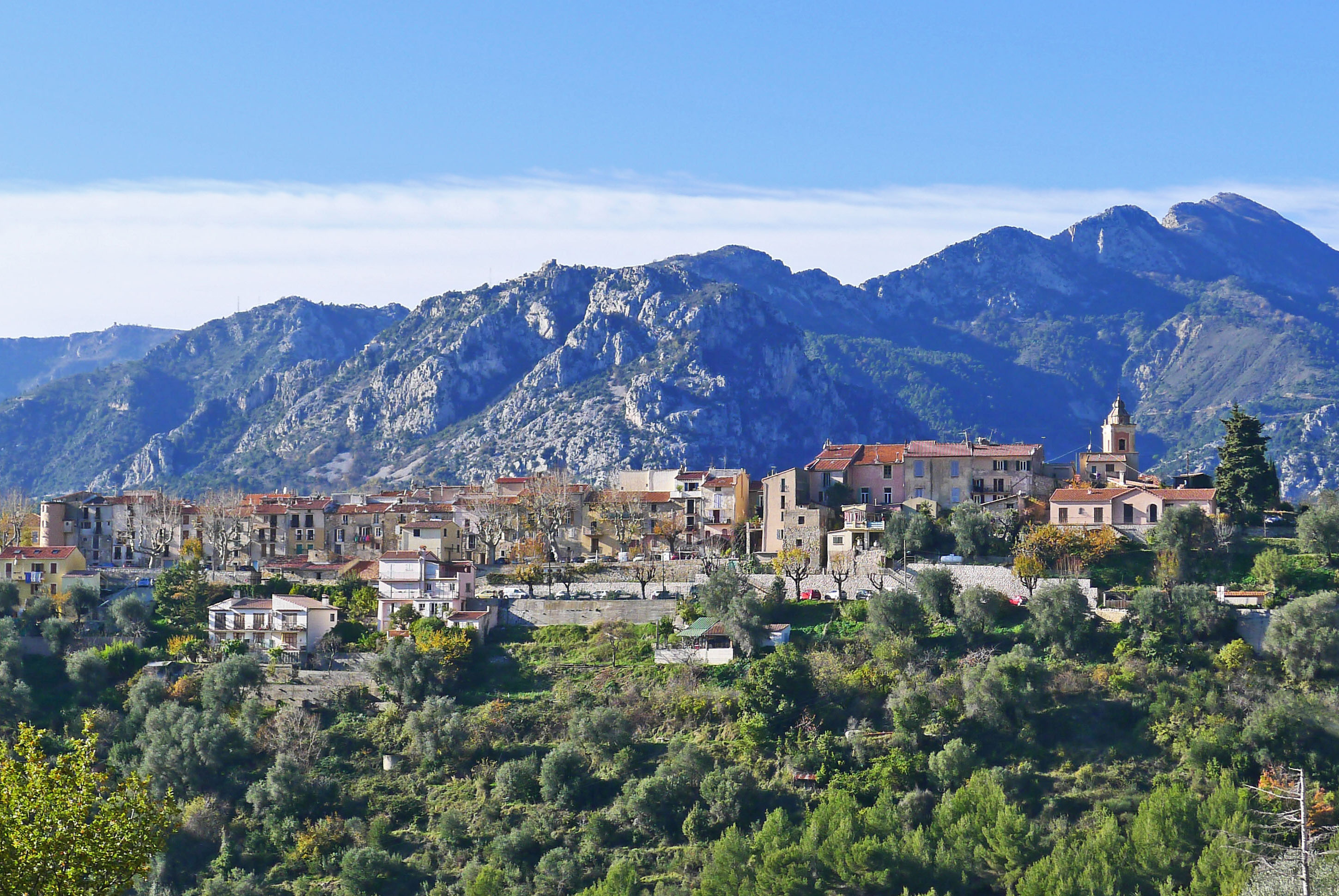
View of Castellar

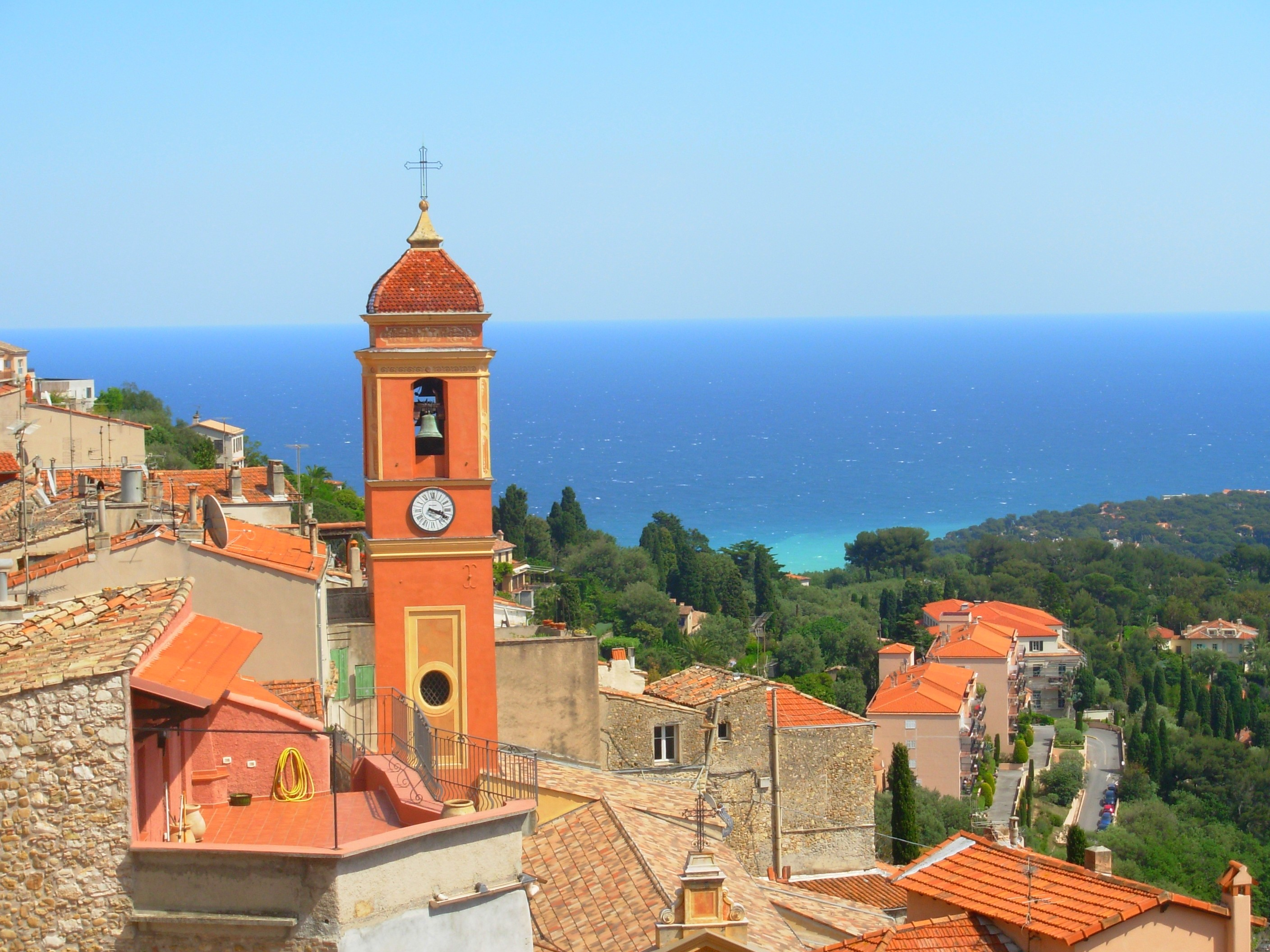
View of Roquebrune-Cap-Martin

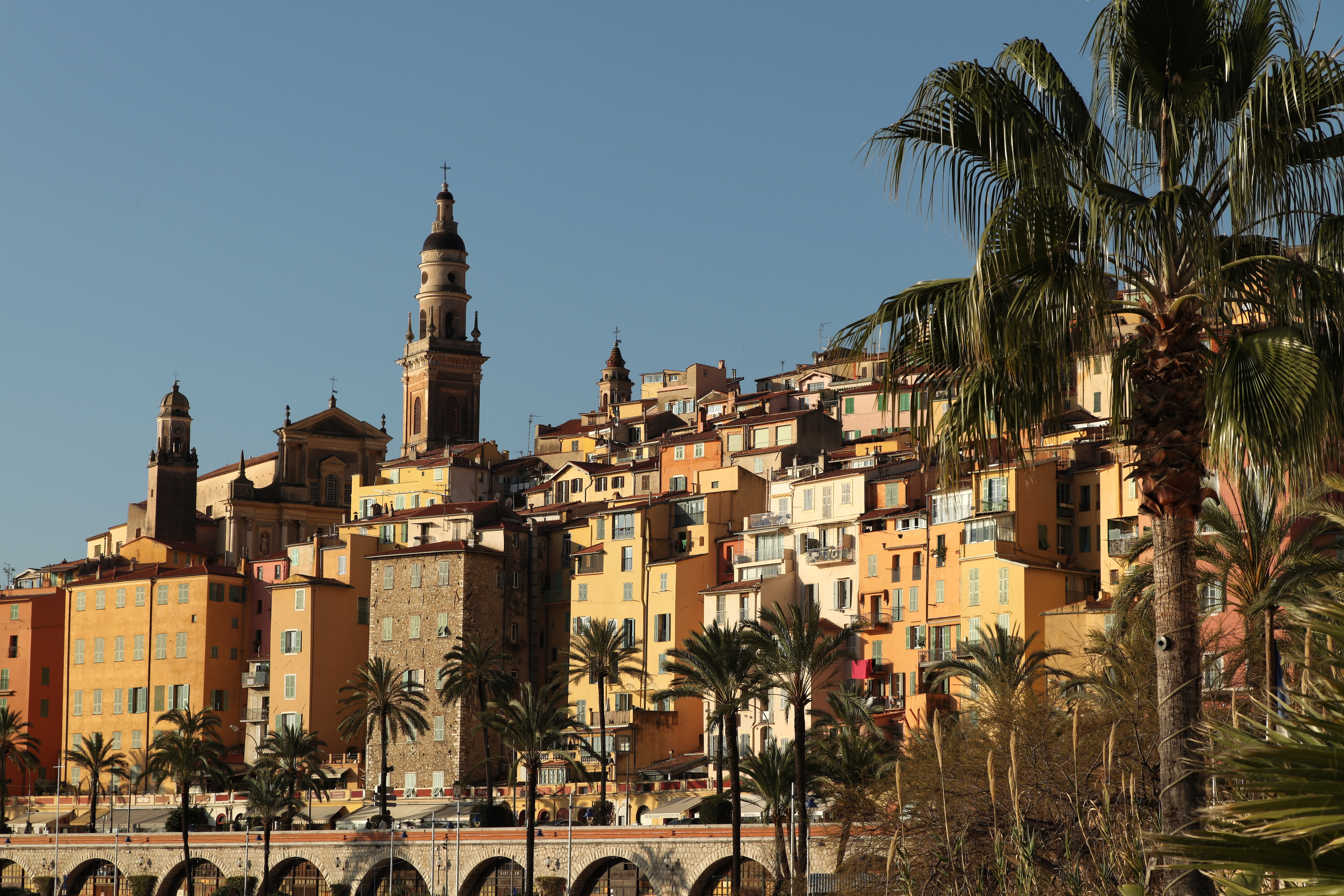
View of Menton
