= Royasc =

Transitional dialect

- Roiasc
- Native to: Italy, France
- Native speakers: (undated figure of approximately 3,000)
- Language family: Indo-European: Romance; Western; Gallo-Romance; Gallo-Italic; Ligurian; Royasc

Language codes
- ISO 639-3: –
- Glottolog: None
- Linguasphere: none

Royasc is a dialect bridging the gap between the Ligurian language and the Occitan language. It is spoken in Italy and France.

== Area of use ==
Area of Royasc in France (blue) and Italy (orange and green)

The Royasc dialect is spoken in the Upper Roya valley, at the boundary of France and Italy. In France, it is spoken in the communes of Breil-sur-Roya, La Brigue, Fontan, Saorge, Tende (Alpes Maritimes). In Italy, it is spoken in the province of Imperia, Liguria - communes of Olivetta San Michele and Triora (only in the villages of Realdo and Verdeggia) and in the province of Cuneo, Piedmont - communes of Briga Alta and the village of Viozene in the commune of Ormea.

The dialect of La Brigue, Briga Alta, Realdo, Viozene, and Verdeggia is also named Brigasc.

== History and position ==
Royasc is the mountainous adaptation of the western Ligurian dialect. It received influence from the Occitan language as the Upper Roya valley was partly ruled by the County of Nice.

Its structure is Ligurian, but its position is discussed: some include it in the Ventimiglia dialect (intemelian) but others consider it a member of a very distinct group of Alpine Ligurian dialects, along with Pignasc and Triorasc.

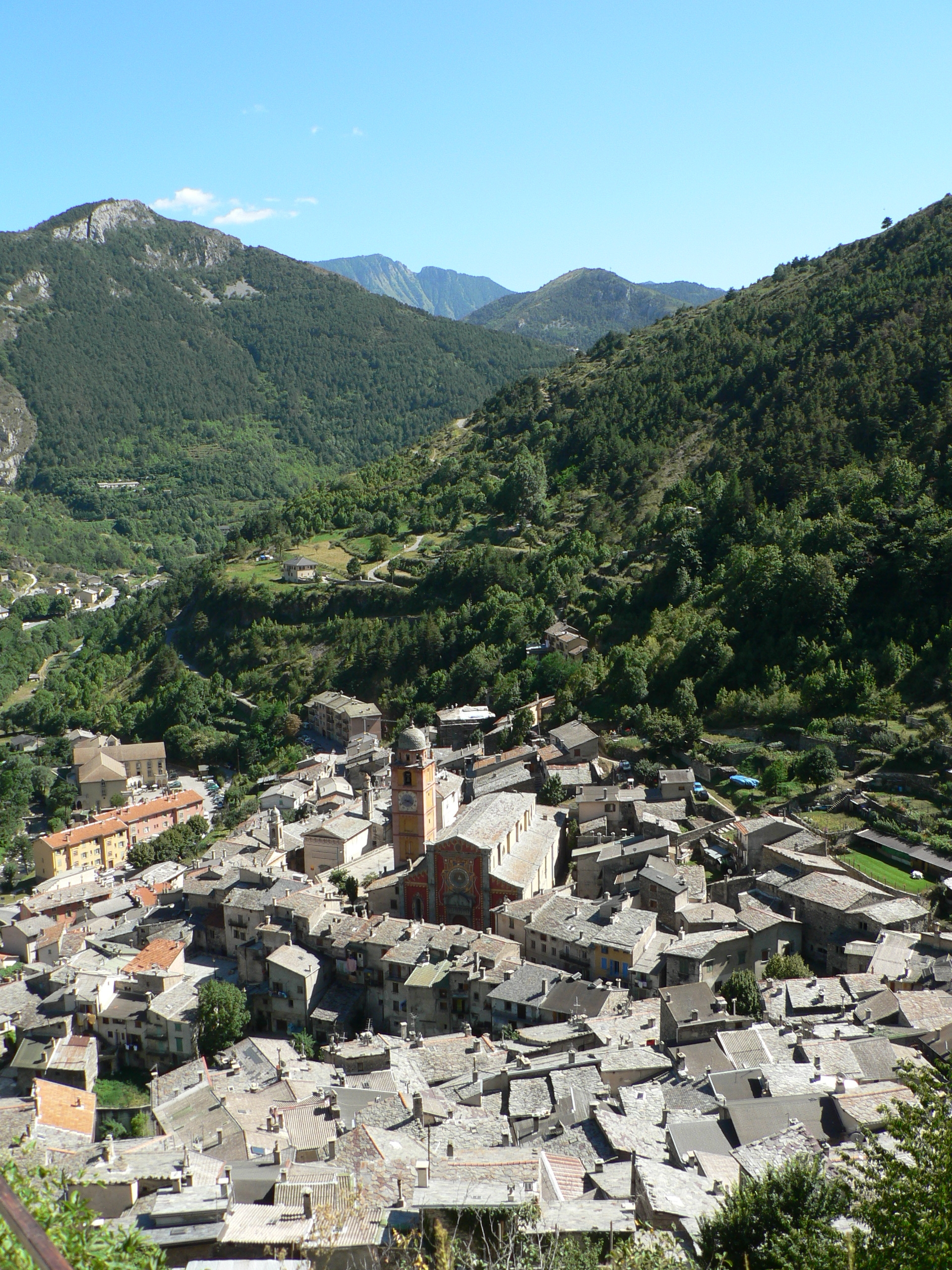
Tende is one of the alpine areas where Royasc is still spoken

Italian Royasc-speaking communes put themselves under the State Law for the protection of minorities, using the Occitan name to do so.

== See also ==
- Intemelio
- Ligurian language
