= Figun dialect =

Dialect of Ligurian

Figun
- Figon, Figoun
- figùn
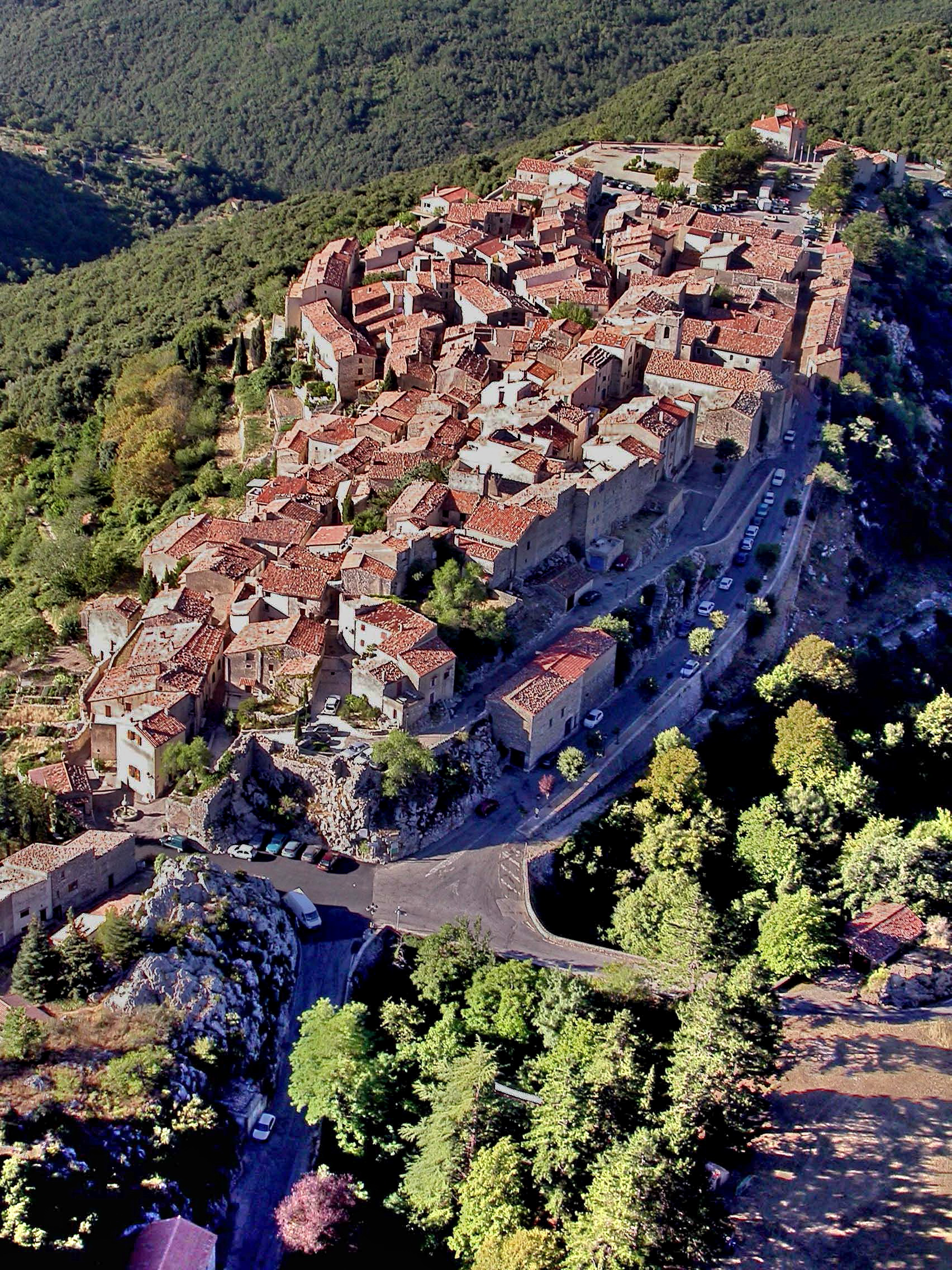
- The medieval town of Mons, where Figun was spoken until the early 20th century
- Native to: France
- Region: Arrondissement of Grasse
- Ethnicity: Figouns
- Extinct: 1470-1920s
- Language family: Indo-European: Italic; Latino-Faliscan; Romance; Italo-Western; Western Romance; Gallo-Romance; Gallo-Italic; Ligurian; Colonial Ligurian; Figun
- Early forms: Proto-Indo-European: Proto-Italic; Old Latin; Vulgar Latin; Proto-Romance
- Dialects: Biot; Vallauris; Mons-Escragnoles

Language codes
- ISO 639-3: –
- Glottolog: None
- Ligurian language in France and Monaco + Figoun (Alpes-Maritimes) + Figoun (Var) Royasque Tendasque (Royasque) Brigasque (Royasque) Monegasc Colonial Ligurian (Bonifacio)

Figun, also known as Figon and Figoun, is an extinct dialect of Ligurian that was spoken from 1470 to the 1920s in Provence, especially in the hinterland of Cannes and the surroundings of Grasse.

== Etymology ==
According to Frédéric Mistral, writer and poet in the Occitan, the name comes from the village of Figonia, a hamlet of Ventimiglia in the Province of Imperia. The first emigrants (20 families) from Figonia would have settled in Mons in 1461, and subsequently expanded – thanks to a prolific demographic growth – to Escragnolles in 1562. However, Figonia is believed to be a fictional place.

The origin of the word figun probably dates back to the Middle Ages and in Liguria referred to a segment of the poor, marginalized, and often nomadic population who consumed dried figs, a fruit abundant in the region that served as a substitute for sugar and honey among the poor. Some Figouns sold these fruits as itinerant vendors. Like all itinerant and nomadic people, dried fig sellers were not well-regarded; the term figun is therefore rather pejorative. It seems that the word figun was exported from the very region where those defined as such by the rest of the local population lived. In Provence, the word, borrowed from Ligurian, subsequently came to designate all the poor emigrants who came from Liguria in the 15th and 16th centuries, as well as their descendants who had preserved their dialect.

== History ==
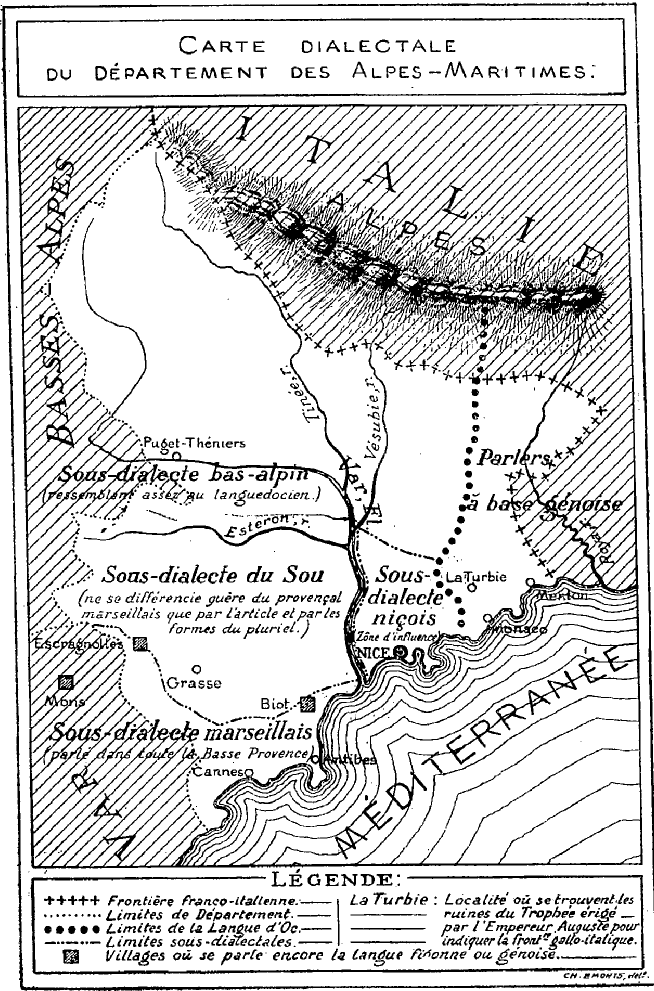
Dialects in Alpes-Maritimes in a map by Loís Funèu from 1897.

The Figouns of Mons were welcomed (in exchange for paying privileges) in two periods: 1260 and 1468.

After the Saracen raids of the Middle Ages and a plague, much of the area near the coast of Provence was uninhabited, so after the Saracens were defeated by William I of Provence, some areas remained uninhabited.

Between 1470 and 1562 the local feudal lords repopulated the area of Cannes and Grasse with inhabitants coming from the Diocese of Albenga–Imperia and the Diocese of Ventimiglia-Sanremo in the Riviera di Ponente and a part of the Republic of Genoa.

The Figouns mainly came from the Ventimiglia region (Nervia Valley, Pigna). As skilled masons, they participated extensively in the construction of the city and its ramparts. It was during their time that the olive tree was introduced to the region. They are often associated with the cultivation, trade, and preparation of figs (frigoule or frigoure), hence their name.

The settlers settled in Biot, Vallauris, Escragnolles and Mons near Cannes and Grasse. The dialect died out in Mons in the 1920s and has left very few written records.

== Classification ==
The figoun dialect is an unstructured mix of Ligurian and Provençal, similar to that found in Escragnolles or Biot. Surnames such as Bosio, Brosco, Bruzon, Canille, Chappory, Chiappe, Chichon, Durante, Galliano, Machiavello, Massa, Monteverde, Olivero, Parody, Passano, Pisarello, Poggio, Porro, Restano, Risso, Sanguinetti, and Traverso are very common there.

Abbot Jean-Pierre Papon in 1780 reported one of the first accounts of this dialect and said "It is believed to be the language of the Saracens: this is a mistake, it is the old patois of Genoa."

== Literature ==
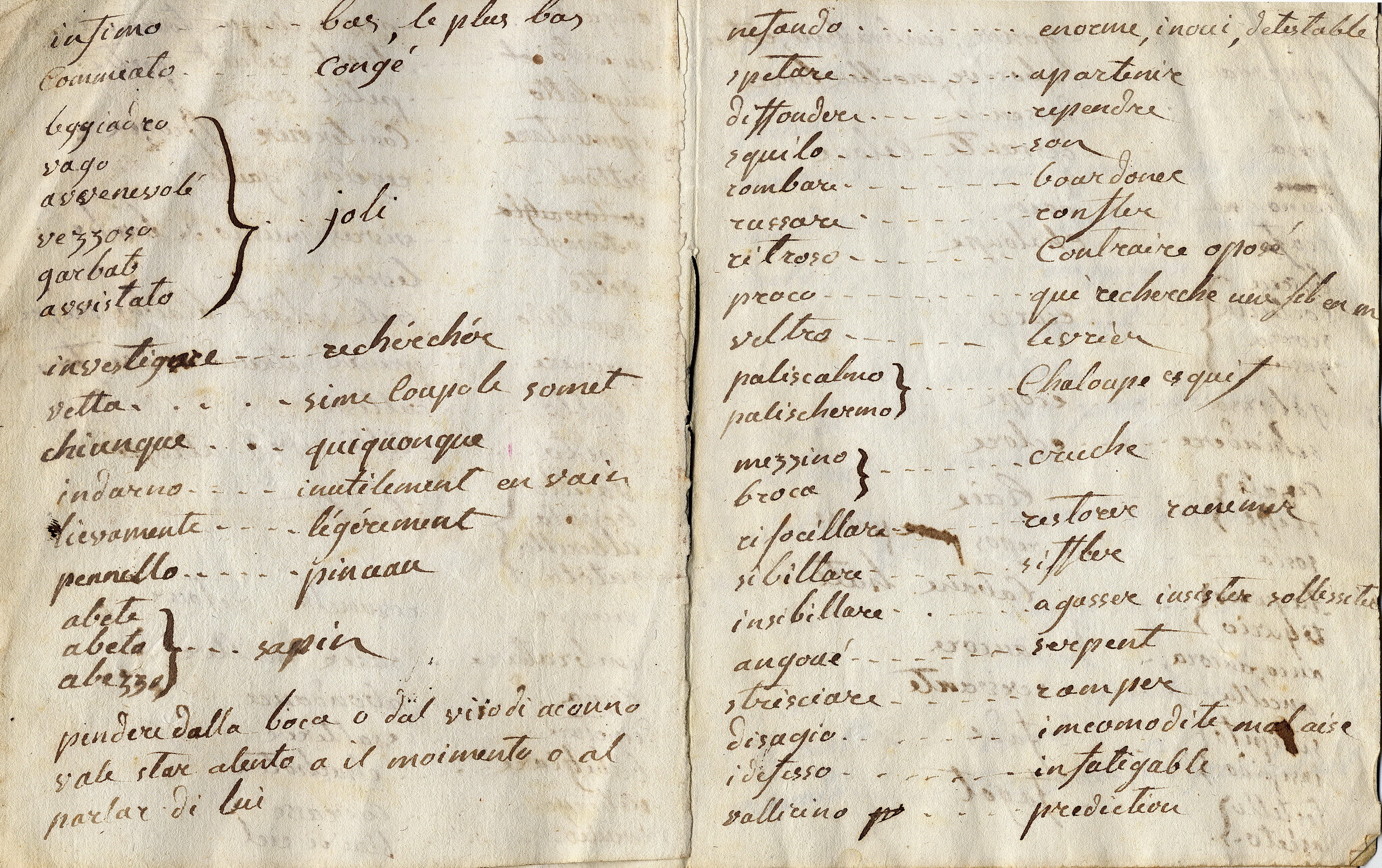
Excerpt from a manuscript from the archives of Beauregard Castle in Mons.

The only example of Figun literature is the story E doue bessoune (Le due gemelle) by Rebuffel Pons, published in 1889, with the only existing copy of the story is still preserved at the Bibliothèque nationale de France in Paris. The extract from a probable Figun-French manuscript lexicon found in the archives of the Château de Beauregard in Mons and identified by Fiorenzo Toso as having similarities with an old patois from the northern region of Genoa.
