= Airole =

Municipality in Liguria, Italy

- Comune
- Comune di Airole
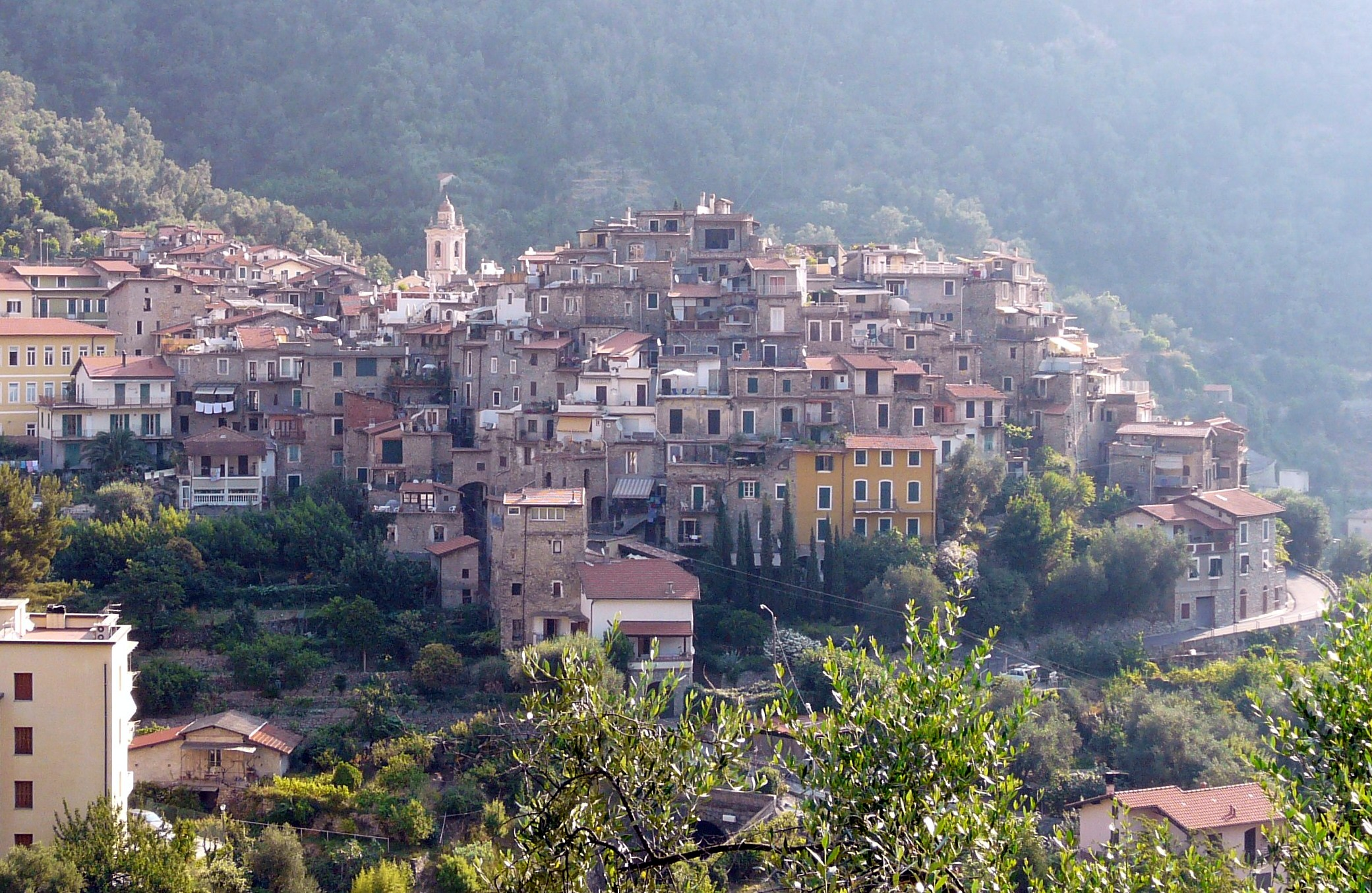
- View of Airole

- Coat of arms

- Location of Airole in Italy Airole (Liguria)
- Coordinates: 43°52′N 7°33′E
- Country: Italy
- Region: Liguria
- Province: Province of Imperia (IM)
- Frazioni: Collabassa, case Noceire, case Giauma

Area
  - Total: 14.8 km^{2} (5.7 sq mi)
- Elevation: 149 m (489 ft)

Population (Dec. 2004)
  - Total: 461
  - Density: 31.1/km^{2} (80.7/sq mi)
- Demonym: Airolesi
- Time zone: UTC+1 (CET)
  - Summer (DST): UTC+2 (CEST)
- Postal code: 18030
- Dialing code: 0184
- Website: Official website

Airole (Ligurian: Airöe, locally Airöre) is a municipality (Italian: comune) in the province of Imperia in the Italian region of Liguria, about 130 kilometres (81 mi) southwest of Genoa and 40 kilometres (25 mi) west of Imperia, on the border with France. As of 31 December 2004, it had a population of 461 and an area of 14.8 square kilometres (5.7 mi^{2}).

The municipality of Airole contains the villages (Italian: frazioni) of Collabassa, Noceire, and Giauma.

Airole borders the following municipalities: Breil-sur-Roya (France), Dolceacqua, Olivetta San Michele, and Ventimiglia.

== Demographic evolution ==
Historical population

Year	Pop.	±%
1861	1,747	—
1871	1,786	+2.2%
1881	1,705	−4.5%
1901	1,382	−18.9%
1911	1,287	−6.9%

Year	Pop.	±%
1921	1,188	−7.7%
1931	958	−19.4%
1936	758	−20.9%
1951	648	−14.5%
1961	542	−16.4%

Year	Pop.	±%
1971	464	−14.4%
1981	520	+12.1%
1991	499	−4.0%
2001	456	−8.6%

Source: Data from ISTAT
