= Fontan, Alpes-Maritimes =

Commune in Provence-Alpes-Côte d'Azur, France

Fontan
- Commune
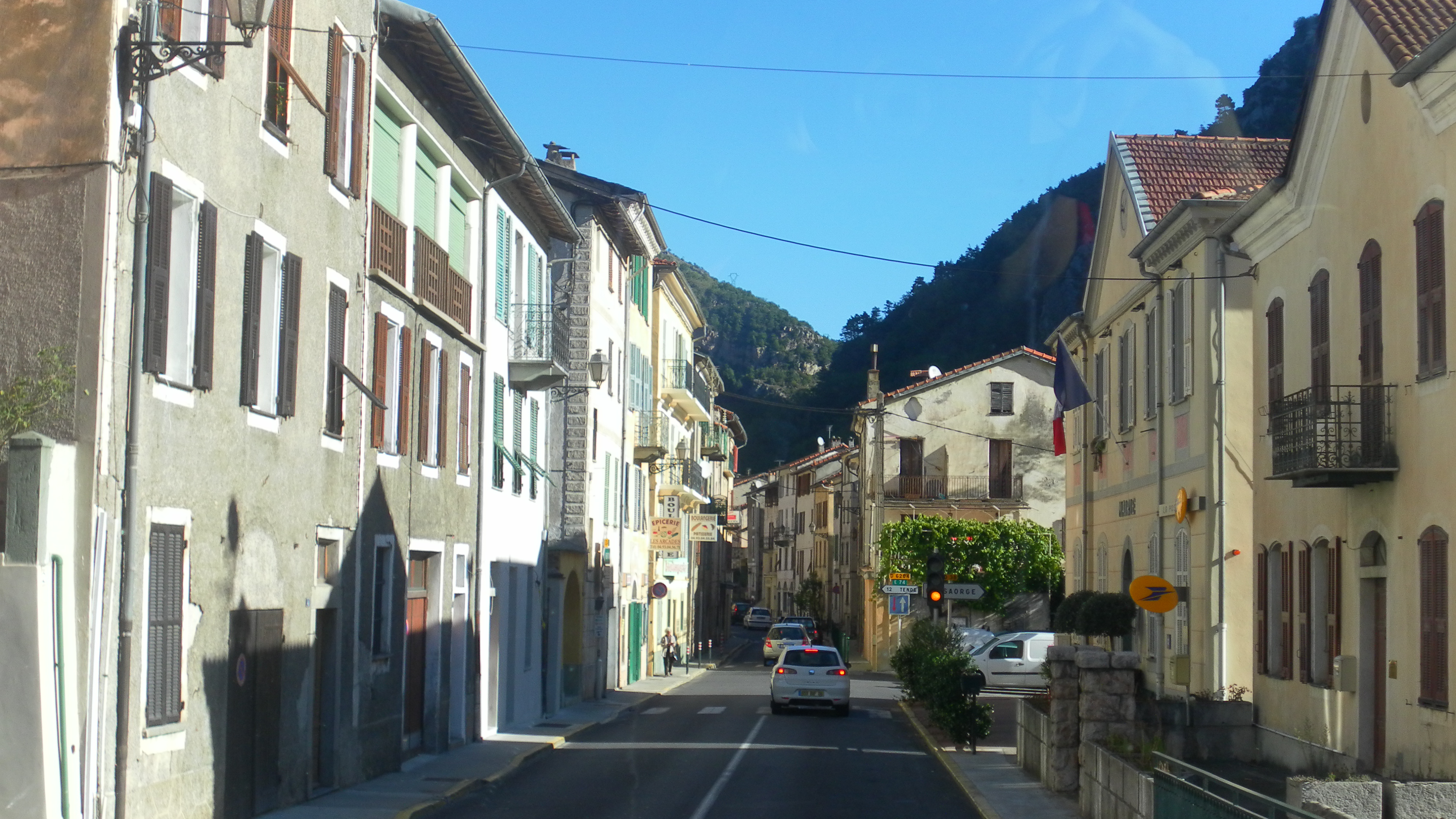
- The road through the village of Fontan

- Coat of arms
- Location of Fontan
- Location within France Location within Provence-Alpes-Côte d'Azur
- Coordinates: 44°00′17″N 7°33′15″E
- Country: France
- Region: Provence-Alpes-Côte d'Azur
- Department: Alpes-Maritimes
- Arrondissement: Nice
- Canton: Contes
- Intercommunality: CA Riviera Française

Government
  - Mayor (2026–32): Philippe Oudot
- Area^{1}: 49.61 km^{2} (19.15 sq mi)
- Elevation: 430 m (1,410 ft)
- Highest elevation: 2,447 m (8,028 ft)
- Lowest elevation: 405 m (1,329 ft)
- Population (2023): 307
  - Density: 6.19/km^{2} (16.0/sq mi)
- Time zone: UTC+01:00 (CET)
  - Summer (DST): UTC+02:00 (CEST)
- INSEE/Postal code: 06062 /06540
- ^{1} French Land Register data, which excludes lakes, ponds, glaciers > 1 km^{2} (0.386 sq mi or 247 acres) and river estuaries.

Fontan (Italian pronunciation: [fonˈtan]; Occitan: Fontano; Ligurian: Funtan) is a commune in the Alpes-Maritimes department in southeastern France.

== Population ==
The inhabitants are called Fontannais in French.

Historical population
Year	Pop.	±% p.a.
1968	326	—
1975	257	−3.34%
1982	253	−0.22%
1990	230	−1.18%
1999	234	+0.19%
2007	284	+2.45%
2012	291	+0.49%
2017	341	+3.22%
2023	307	−1.74%
Source: INSEE

== See also ==
- Communes of the Alpes-Maritimes department
