= Carei (river) =

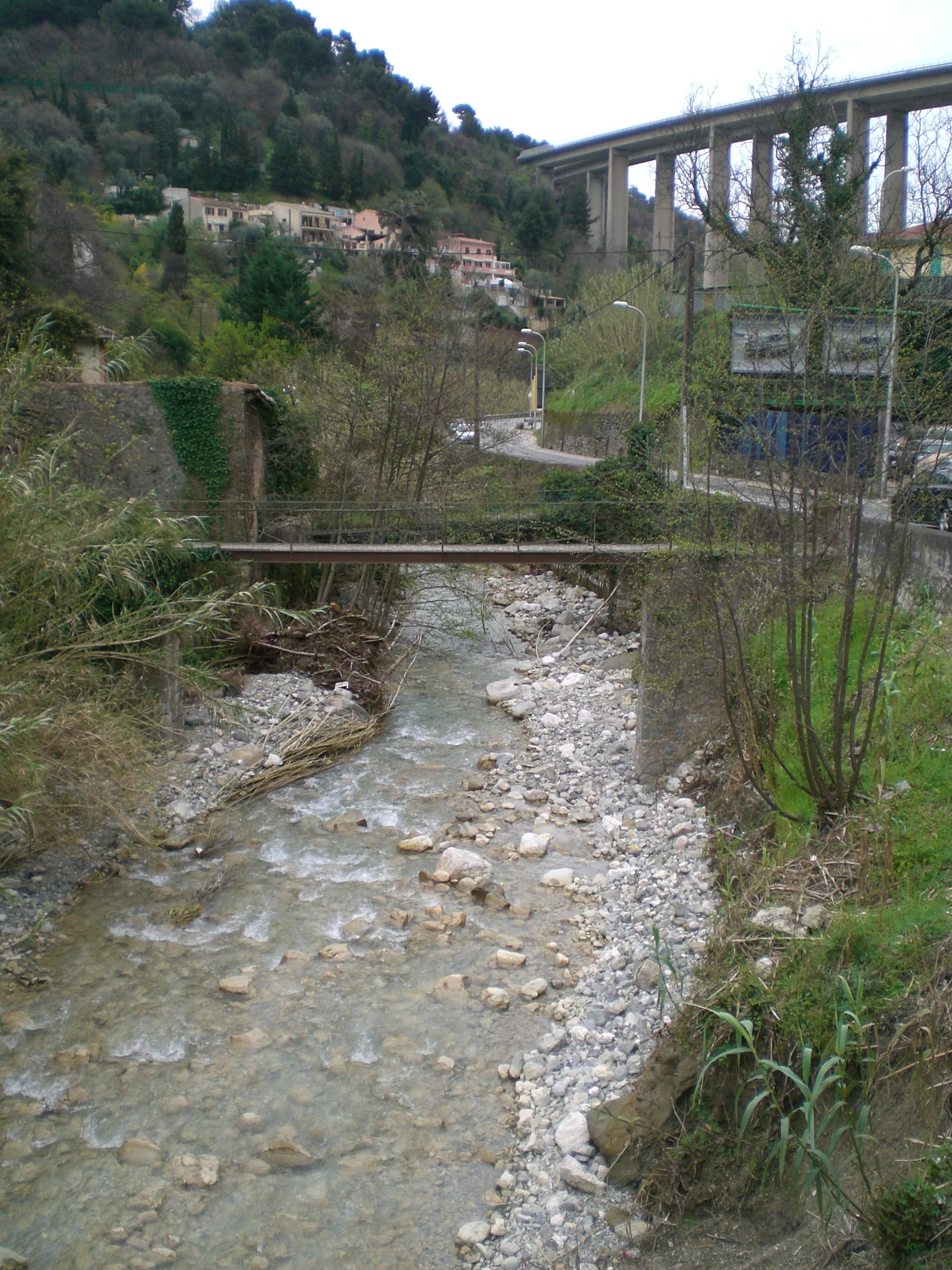

Location
- Country: France

Physical characteristics
- Mouth
  - location: Mediterranean Sea
  - coordinates: 43°46′21″N 7°29′57″E
- Length: 10 km (6 mi)
- Basin size: 20.3 km^{2} (7.8 sq mi)

The Carei (also: Caréi or Careï) is a river that flows through the Alpes-Maritimes department of southeastern France. It is 10 km (6.2 mi) long. Its drainage basin is 20.3 km^{2} (7.8 sq mi). Its source is near Castillon, and it flows into the Mediterranean Sea in Menton.
