= Castillon, Alpes-Maritimes =

Commune in Provence-Alpes-Côte d'Azur, France

Castillon
- Commune
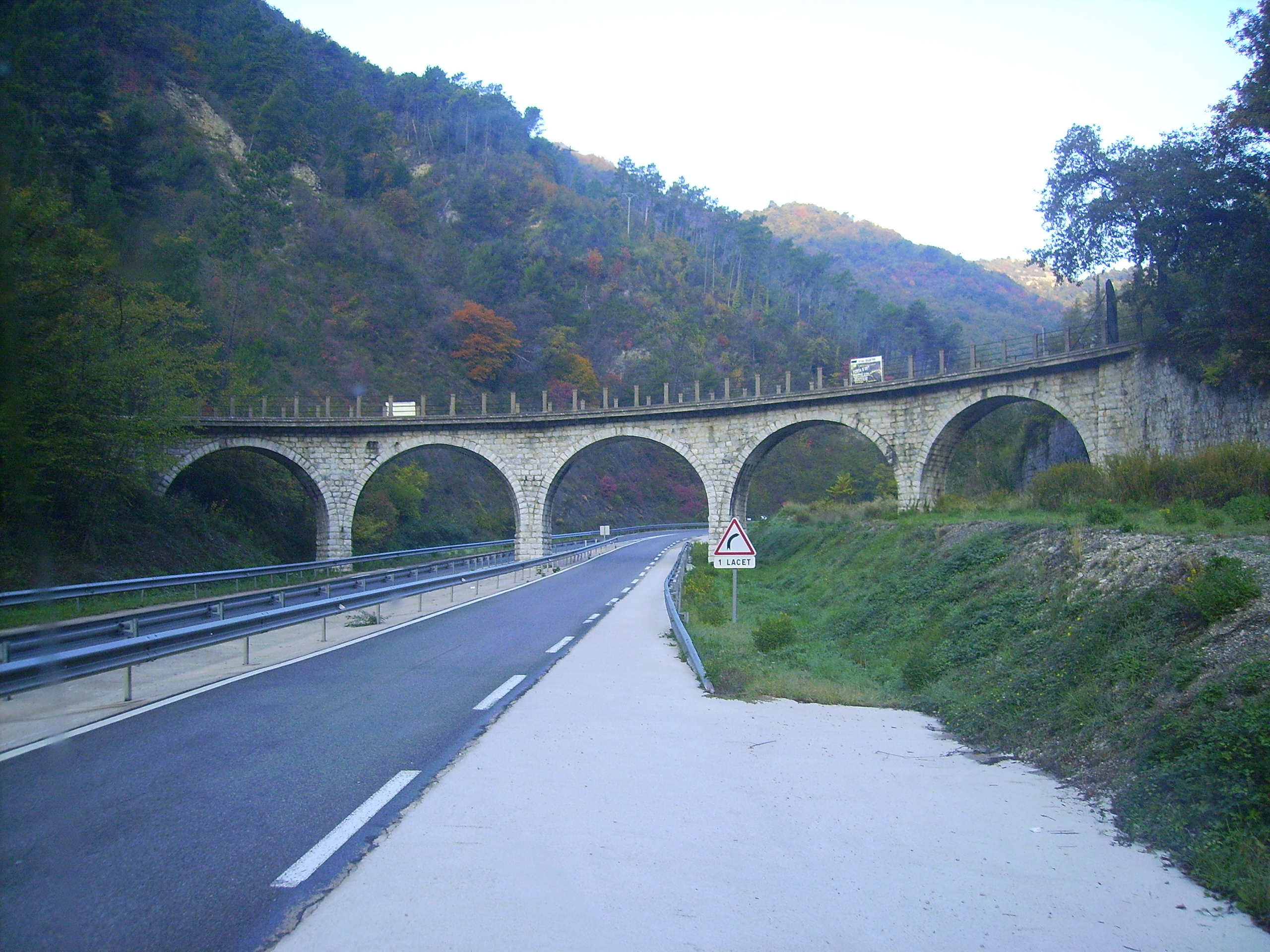
- The Carei viaduct, built in 1912, for the old tramway which connected Menton to Sospel and which ceased being used by trams in 1931

- Flag Coat of arms
- Location of Castillon
- Location within France Location within Provence-Alpes-Côte d'Azur
- Coordinates: 43°50′N 7°28′E
- Country: France
- Region: Provence-Alpes-Côte d'Azur
- Department: Alpes-Maritimes
- Arrondissement: Nice
- Canton: Menton
- Intercommunality: CA Riviera Française

Government
  - Mayor (2026–32): Olivier Chantreau
- Area^{1}: 7.51 km^{2} (2.90 sq mi)
- Highest elevation: 1,289 m (4,229 ft)
- Lowest elevation: 275 m (902 ft)
- Population (2023): 425
  - Density: 56.6/km^{2} (147/sq mi)
- Time zone: UTC+01:00 (CET)
  - Summer (DST): UTC+02:00 (CEST)
- INSEE/Postal code: 06036 /06500
- ^{1} French Land Register data, which excludes lakes, ponds, glaciers > 1 km^{2} (0.386 sq mi or 247 acres) and river estuaries.

Castillon (French: [kastijɔ̃]; Occitan: Castilhon; Italian: Castiglione) is a commune in the Alpes-Maritimes department in southeastern France.

== Population ==
Historical population
Year	Pop.	±% p.a.
1968	97	—
1975	55	−7.79%
1982	79	+5.31%
1990	187	+11.37%
1999	282	+4.67%
2007	326	+1.83%
2012	383	+3.28%
2017	367	−0.85%
2023	425	+2.48%
Source: INSEE

== See also ==
- Communes of the Alpes-Maritimes department
