= Intemelio dialect =

Ligurian dialect spoke historically spoken from Monaco to Italian Imperia

Intemelio
- intemelio
- Native to: Monaco, France, Italy
- Native speakers: (undated figure of approximately 10,000)
- Language family: Indo-European: Romance; Western; Gallo-Romance; Gallo-Italic; Ligurian; Intemelio

Language codes
- ISO 639-3: –
- Glottolog: None
- Linguasphere: (Imperia) 51-AAA-ohb (Imperia)

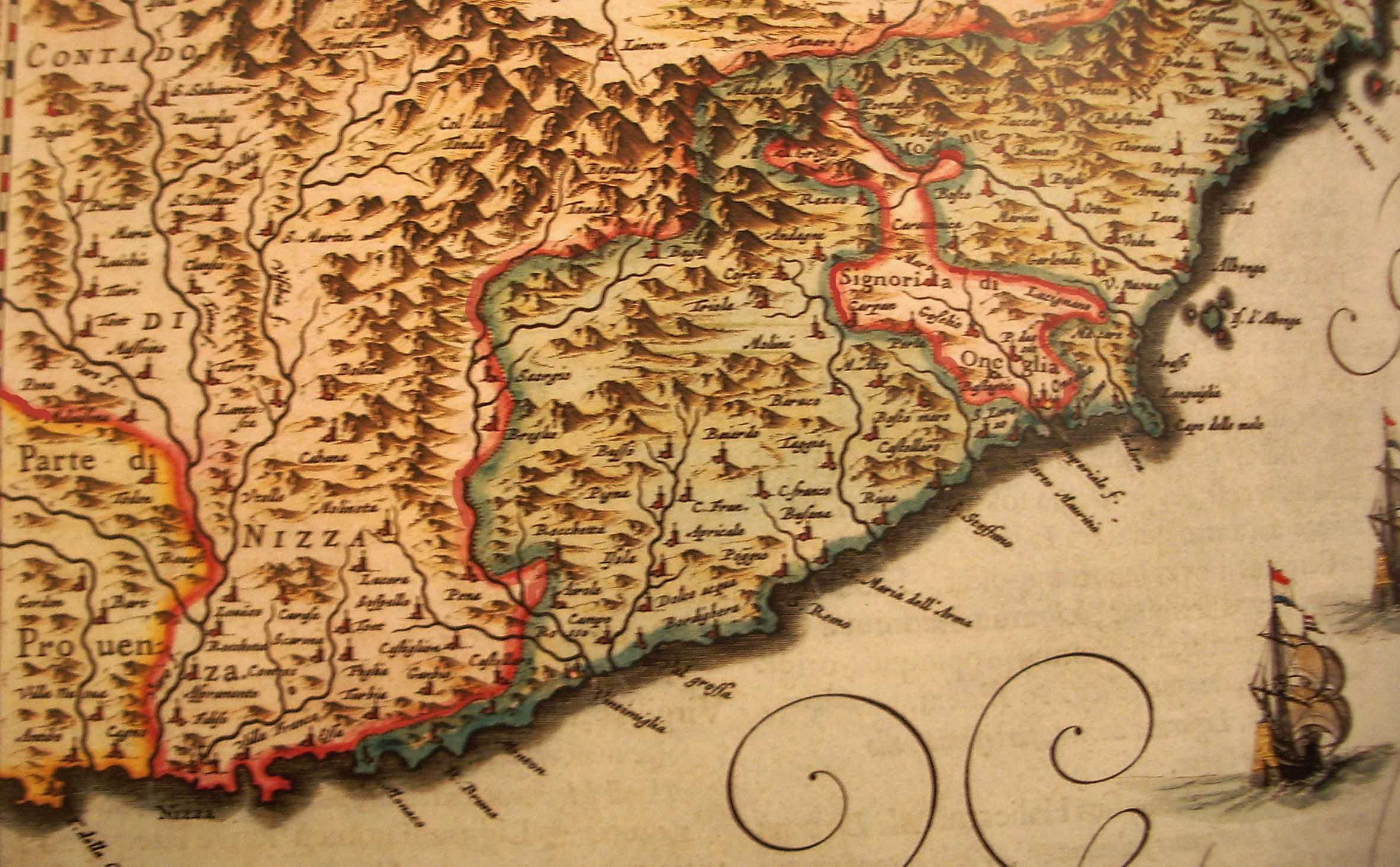
Monaco -with Menton- was the extreme western area of the Republic of Genoa (green color) in 1664. Intemelio was spoken in this area, primarily between Ventimiglia and Sanremo.

Intemelio is a Ligurian dialect spoken historically from the Principality of Monaco to the Italian province of Imperia.

== History ==
Since the Renaissance the Ligurian language was spoken in all the territories of the Republic of Genoa; in the western area of the Republic one of its groups (spoken mainly on the coast between Monaco and Sanremo) was called Intemelio and was centered on Ventimiglia.

In the actual Italian area of Ventimiglia there is the most renowned Intemelio: the "Ventimigliese", that stretches from the coast until Piedmont.

The Royasc dialect is connected to the "Ventimigliese", as a mountainous version of the Intemelio that has some Occitan influences.

In Sanremo the local intemelio dialect is heavily influenced by the Genoese dialect.

== Current use ==
Intemelio is used by nearly 10,000 people in the area of Ventimiglia of the province of Imperia, but other 40,000 are able to understand it and speak a few sentences of this dialect in western Liguria.

A few thousand speak fluently the local variants of Intemelio in France and Monaco: Monegasque, and Brigasc.

== Anecdote ==
The Ligurian area of Seborga speaks the "Ventimigliese" dialect Intemelio and the so-called Principality of Seborga considered the possibility of using this dialect as the official language.

== See also ==
- Occitan language
- Italian irredentism in Nice

== Bibliography ==
- Azaretti, Emilio. L'evoluzione dei dialetti liguri. Sanremo: Edizioni Casabianca, 1982. Pp. xxii + 416.
- Dalbera, Jean-Philippe. Les Ilots Liguriens de France, dans Les Langues de France sous la direction de B. Cerquiglini. (Délégation générale à la langue française et aux langues de France). Presses Universitaires de France. Paris, 2003. pp. 125–136
- Devoto, Giovanni. I Dialetti delle Regioni d'Italia. Sansoni Editore. Florence, 1971
- Toso, Fiorenzo. Liguria linguistica. Dialettologia, storia della lingua e letteratura nel Ponente. Philobiblon. Ventimiglia, 2006
- Werner Forner. À propos du ligurien intémélien - La côte, l’arrière-pays. . Travaux du Cercle linguistique de Nice, 7–8, 1986, pp. 29–62.
- Werner Forner, Morphologie comparée du mentonnais et du ligurien alpin: Analyse synchronique et essai de reconstruction. DeGruyter, 2022.
- Magazine Intemelion. Edited in Sanremo by Brigati Glauco, from Review La voce intemelia.
