= Gorbio =

Commune in Provence-Alpes-Côte d'Azur, France

- Commune
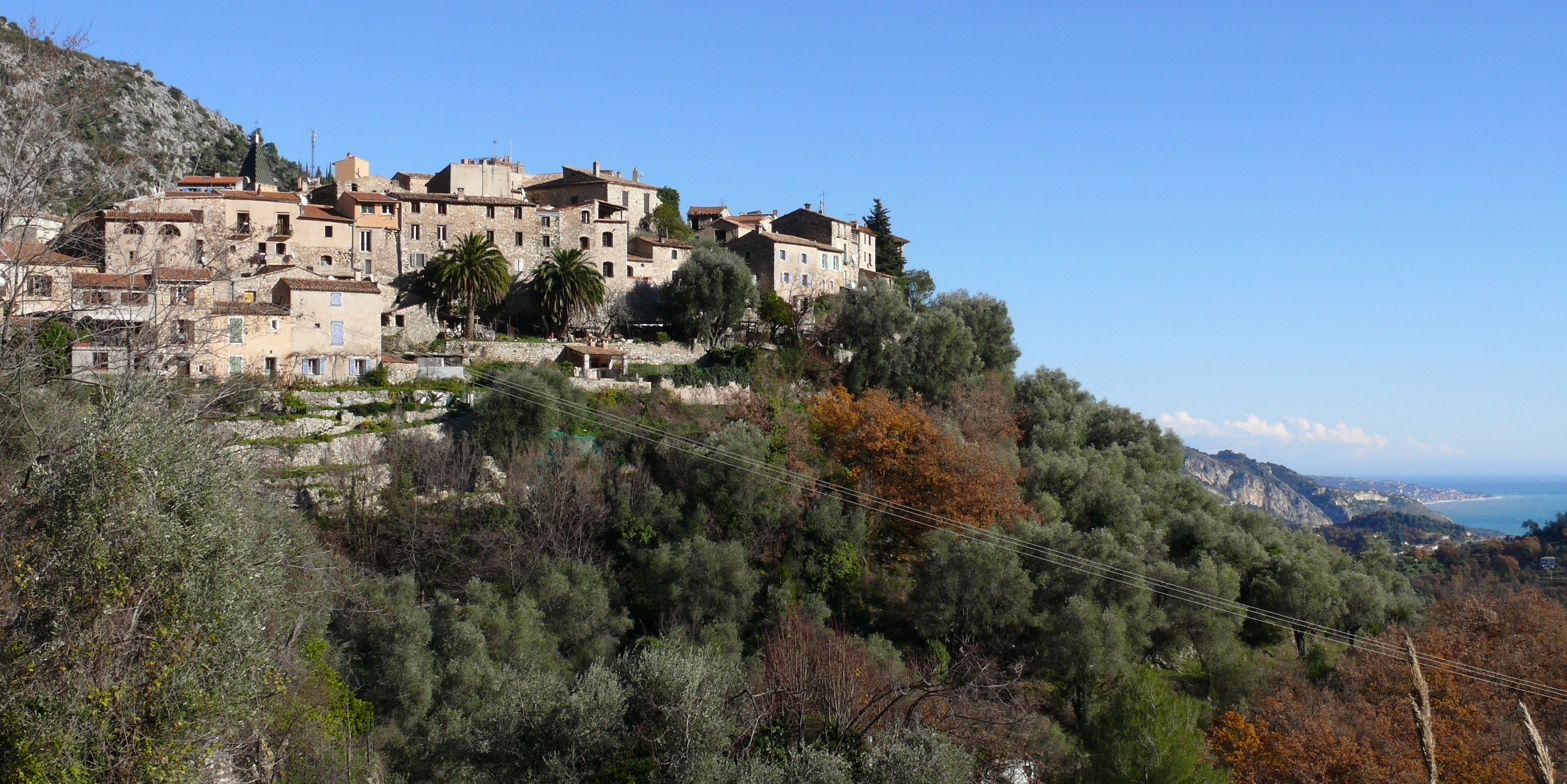
- A general view of Gorbio

- Coat of arms
- Location of Gorbio
- Location within France Location within Provence-Alpes-Côte d'Azur
- Coordinates: 43°47′15″N 7°26′45″E
- Country: France
- Region: Provence-Alpes-Côte d'Azur
- Department: Alpes-Maritimes
- Arrondissement: Nice
- Canton: Menton
- Intercommunality: CA Riviera Française

Government
  - Mayor (2026–32): Fabrice Pastor
- Area^{1}: 7.02 km^{2} (2.71 sq mi)
- Elevation: 360 m (1,180 ft)
- Highest elevation: 928 m (3,045 ft)
- Lowest elevation: 77 m (253 ft)
- Population (2023): 1,609
  - Density: 229/km^{2} (594/sq mi)
- Demonym: Gorbarin
- Time zone: UTC+01:00 (CET)
  - Summer (DST): UTC+02:00 (CEST)
- INSEE/Postal code: 06067 /06500
- ^{1} French Land Register data, which excludes lakes, ponds, glaciers > 1 km^{2} (0.386 sq mi or 247 acres) and river estuaries.

Gorbio (French pronunciation: [ɡɔʁbjo]; Occitan: Gòrbi) is a commune in the Alpes-Maritimes department in southeastern France.

Gorbio may be seen in the video for Celine Dion's song Falling Into You.

== Population ==
The inhabitants are called Gorbarins in French.

Historical population
Year	Pop.	±% p.a.
1968	644	—
1975	538	−2.54%
1982	576	+0.98%
1990	930	+6.17%
1999	1,154	+2.43%
2007	1,295	+1.45%
2012	1,304	+0.14%
2017	1,549	+3.50%
2023	1,609	+0.64%
Source: INSEE

== See also ==
- Communes of the Alpes-Maritimes department
