= Academia Ligustica do Brenno =

Italian society whose aim is to maintain the purity of the Genoese dialect

- The geographic distribution of the Ligurian language.
- Formation: 1970
- Headquarters: Genoa, Italy
- Official language: Ligurian
- Website: www.zeneize.net/index.html

The Academia Ligustica do Brenno ("Ligurian Academy of the Bran") is an Italian society founded in Genoa in 1970 with the aim of maintaining the purity of the Genoese dialect and other variants of Ligurian language. The name of the society is sometimes stylised as Académia Ligùstica do Brénno, showing the optional diacritical marks for educational purposes.

The Academia publishes an orthography of Ligurian, called grafia ofiçiâ ("official orthography"), with the aim of standardising the various ways of spelling Ligurian in a coherent and unambiguous way. It has been adopted for several books, websites, software packages, as well as for the Ligurian edition of Wikipedia. It is also used for the online dictionary hosted by the Academia.

== Bibliography ==
- Niri, Raffaele (25 February 2009). "Zeneize misterioso dialetto" [Genoese, mysterious dialect]. La Repubblica (in Italian). Archived from the original on 30 July 2016.
- Bampi, Franco (1 October 2008). Nuovo dizionario italiano-genovese illustrato e commentato [New Illustrated and Commented Italian-Genoese Dictionary]. Genoa, Italy: Nuova Editrice Genovese. ISBN 978-8888963211.
- Bampi, Franco; Tardito, Carlo; Pallotti, Guido; Bacigalupo, Nicolò. Bampi, Franco (ed.). Collana Bolezùmme. Genoa, Italy: S.E.S. – Società Editrice Sampierdarenese.
