= Castellar, Alpes-Maritimes =

Commune in Provence-Alpes-Côte d'Azur, France

Castellar
- Commune
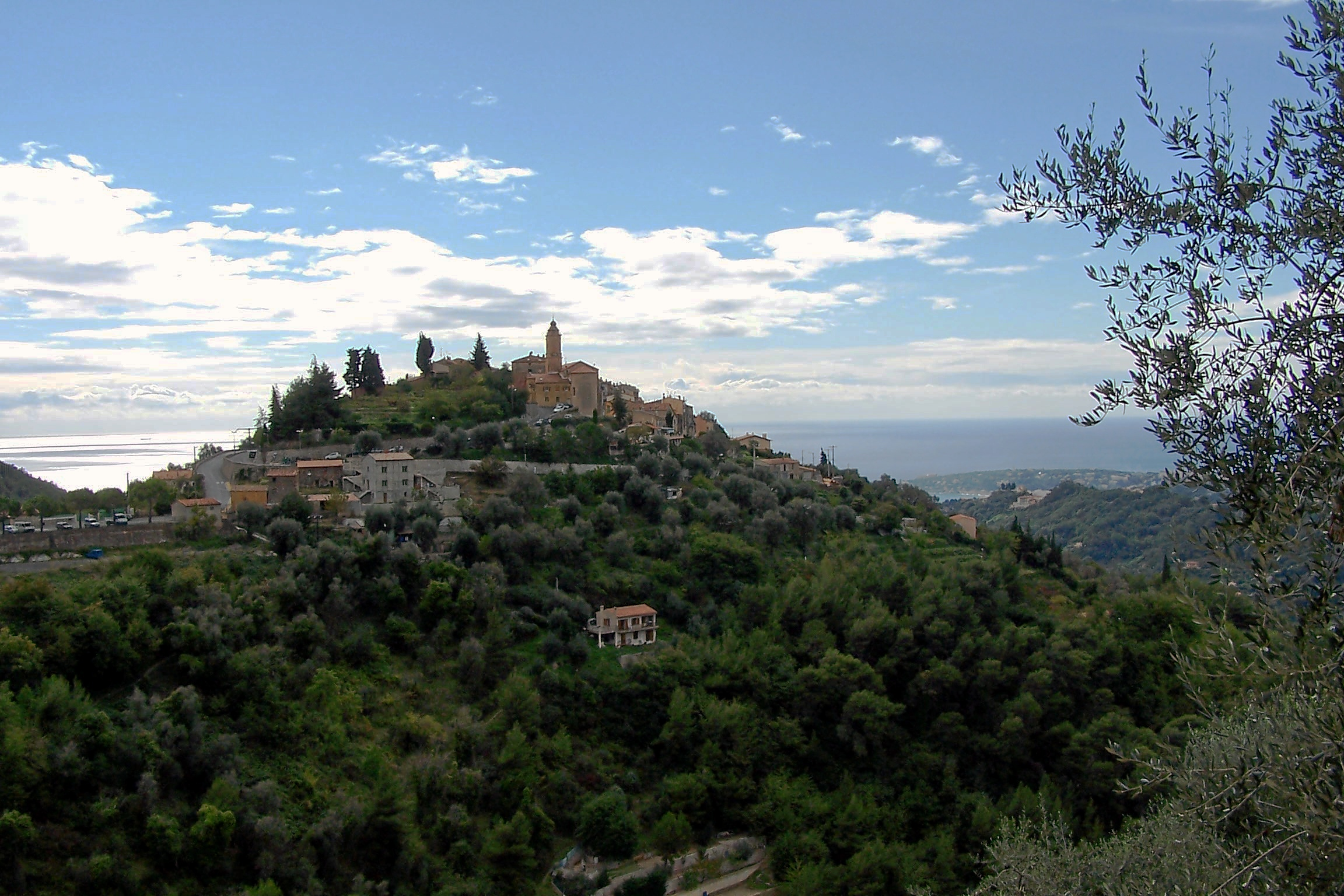
- A general view of Castellar

- Coat of arms
- Location of Castellar
- Location within France Location within Provence-Alpes-Côte d'Azur
- Coordinates: 43°48′16″N 7°29′50″E
- Country: France
- Region: Provence-Alpes-Côte d'Azur
- Department: Alpes-Maritimes
- Arrondissement: Nice
- Canton: Menton
- Intercommunality: CA Riviera Française

Government
  - Mayor (2026–32): Anne-Marie Arsento-Curti
- Area^{1}: 12.24 km^{2} (4.73 sq mi)
- Elevation: 363 m (1,191 ft)
- Highest elevation: 1,382 m (4,534 ft)
- Lowest elevation: 100 m (330 ft)
- Population (2023): 996
  - Density: 81.4/km^{2} (211/sq mi)
- Time zone: UTC+01:00 (CET)
  - Summer (DST): UTC+02:00 (CEST)
- INSEE/Postal code: 06035 /06500
- ^{1} French Land Register data, which excludes lakes, ponds, glaciers > 1 km^{2} (0.386 sq mi or 247 acres) and river estuaries.

Castellar (French pronunciation: [kastɛlaʁ]; Occitan: Castelar; Italian: Castellaro) is a commune in the Alpes-Maritimes department in southeastern France.

== Population ==
Historical population
Year	Pop.	±% p.a.
1968	306	—
1975	353	+2.06%
1982	533	+6.06%
1990	638	+2.27%
1999	821	+2.84%
2007	944	+1.76%
2012	963	+0.40%
2017	1,100	+2.70%
2023	996	−1.64%
Source: INSEE

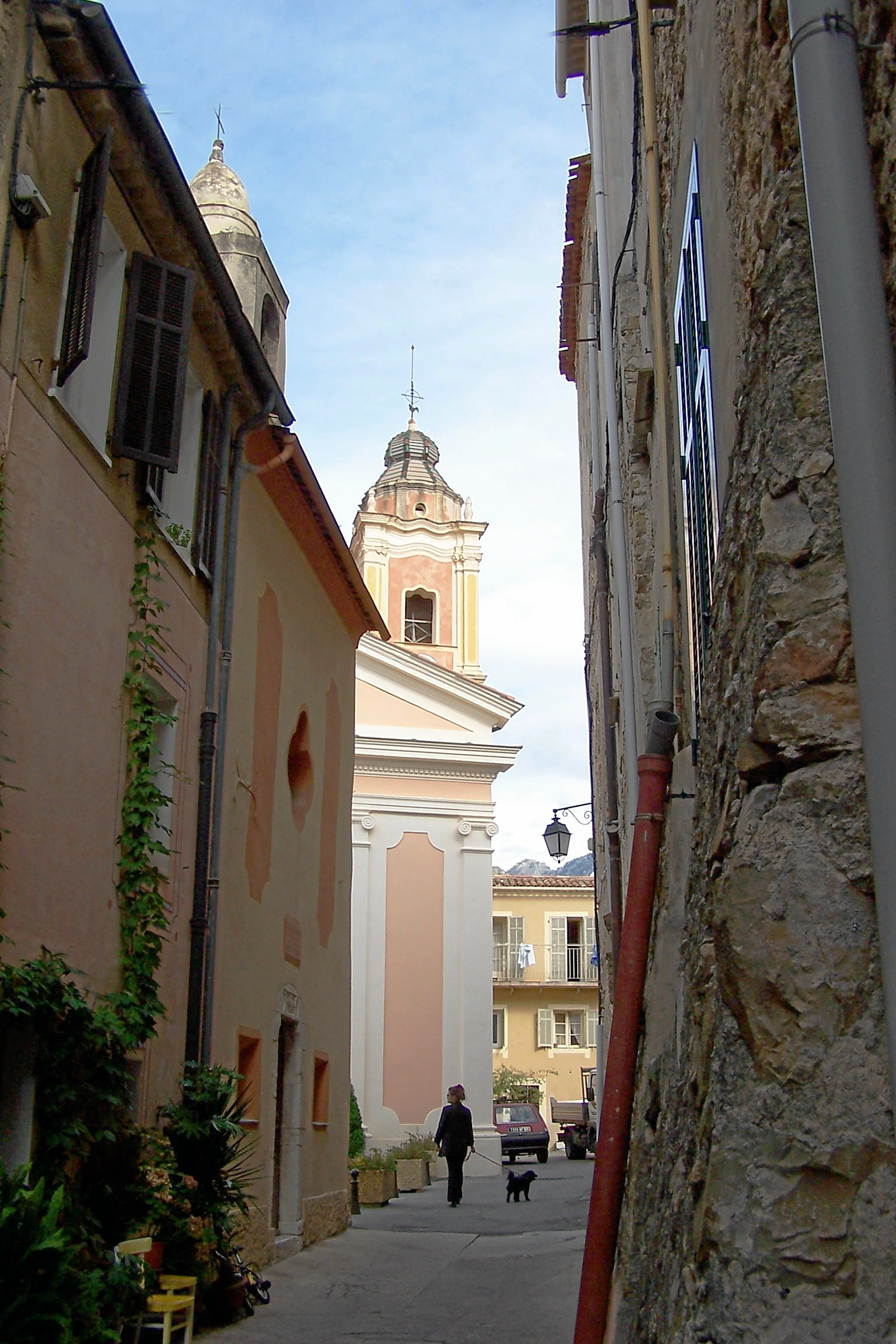

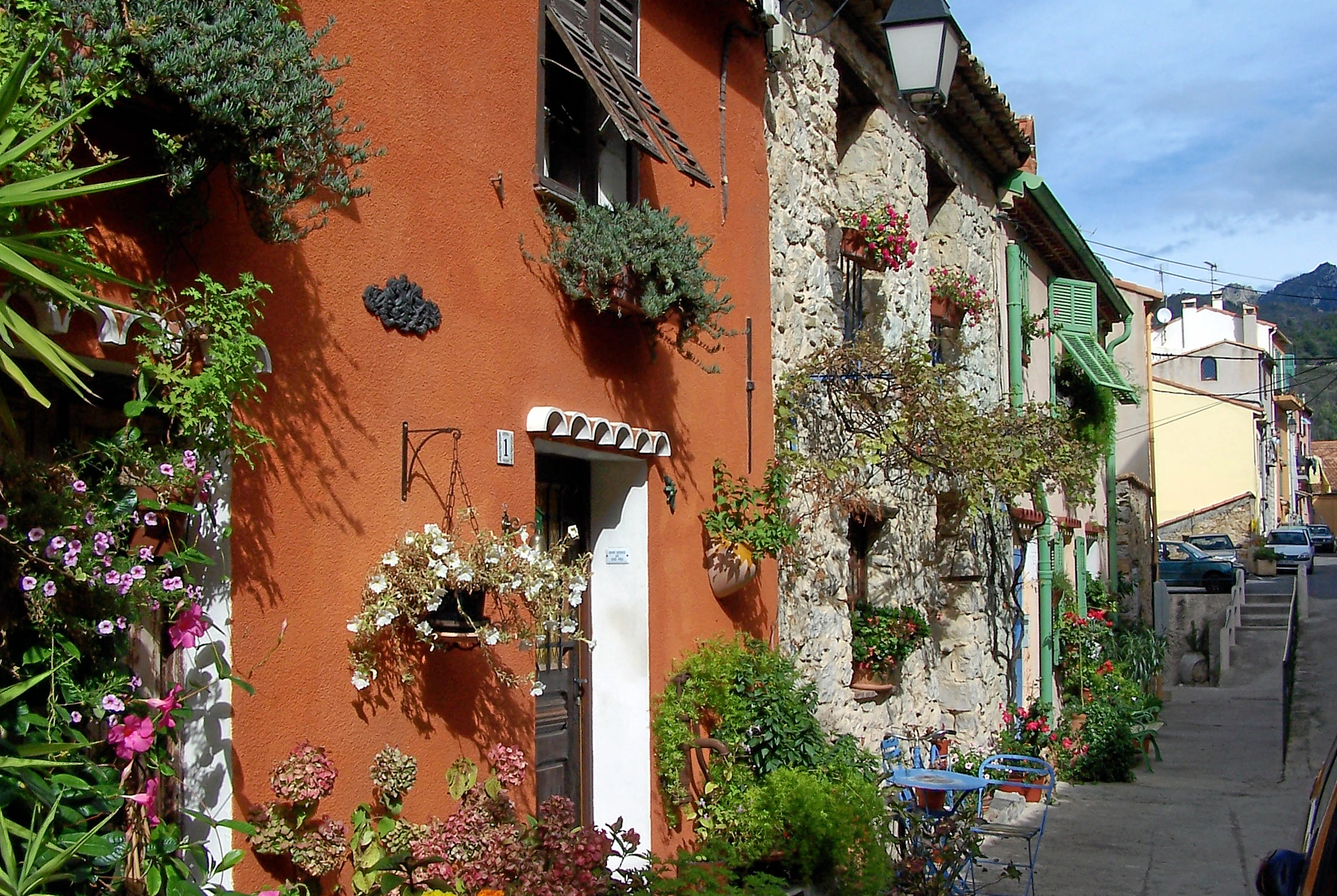

== See also ==
- Communes of the Alpes-Maritimes department
