= Ligurian language =

Gallo-Romance language native to Liguria, northern Italy

Ligurian
- Genoese
- lìgure, zeneize
- Pronunciation: [ˈliɡyɾe], [zeˈnejze]
- Native to: Italy, Monaco, France
- Region: Italy • Liguria • Southern Piedmont • Southwestern Lombardy • Western Emilia-Romagna • Southwestern Sardinia; France • Southeastern Provence-Alpes-Côte d'Azur • Southern Corsica
- Native speakers: 600,000 (2002)
- Language family: Indo-European: Italic; Latino-Faliscan; Latin; Romance; Italo-Western; Western Romance; Gallo-Romance; Gallo-Italic; Ligurian
- Early forms: Proto-Indo-European: Proto-Italic; Old Latin; Vulgar Latin; Proto-Romance
- Dialects: Brigasc; Figun †; Genoese; Intemelio; Monégasque; Royasc; Tabarchino

Language codes
- ISO 639-3: lij
- Glottolog: ligu1248
- Linguasphere: 51-AAA-oh

Ligurian (/lɪ.ˈɡjʊər.i.ən/ lig-YOOR-ee-ən; endonym: lìgure) or Genoese (/ˌdʒɛn.oʊ.ˈiːz/ JEN-oh-EEZ; endonym: zeneise or zeneize) is a Gallo-Italic language. Ligurian is spoken primarily in the territories of the former Republic of Genoa, now comprising the area of Liguria in Northern Italy, parts of the Mediterranean coastal zone of France, Monaco (where it is called Monégasque), the village of Bonifacio in Corsica, and in the villages of Carloforte on San Pietro Island and Calasetta on Sant'Antioco Island off the coast of southwestern Sardinia. It is part of the Gallo-Italic and Western Romance dialect continuum. Although part of Gallo-Italic, it exhibits several features of the Italo-Romance group of central and southern Italy. Zeneize (literally "Genoese"), spoken in Genoa, the capital of Liguria, is the language's prestige dialect on which the standard is based.

There is a long literary tradition of Ligurian poets and writers that goes from the 13th century to the present, such as Luchetto (the Genoese Anonym), Martin Piaggio, and Gian Giacomo Cavalli.

A man speaking Ligurian, recorded in Italy

== Geographic extent and status ==
=== Status ===
The Italian Government does not consider Ligurian a language, but rather a dialect of Italian. Hence, it is not protected by law. Historically, Genoese (the dialect spoken in the city of Genoa) is the written koiné, owing to its semi-official role as language of the Republic of Genoa, its traditional importance in trade and commerce, and its vast literature.

Like other regional languages in Italy, the use of Ligurian and its dialects is in rapid decline. ISTAT (the Italian Central Service of Statistics) says that in 2012 only 9% of the population used a language other than standard Italian with friends and family, which decreased to 1.8% with strangers. Furthermore, according to ISTAT, regional languages are more commonly spoken by uneducated people and the elderly, mostly in rural areas. Liguria is no exception. One can reasonably suppose the age pyramid to be strongly biased toward the elderly who were born before World War II, with proficiency rapidly approaching zero for newer generations. Compared to other regional languages of Italy, Ligurian has experienced a significantly smaller decline which could have been a consequence of its status or the early decline it underwent in the past. The language itself is actively preserved by various groups.

=== Geographic extent ===
Because of the importance of Genoese trade, Ligurian was once spoken well beyond the borders of the modern province. It has since given way to standard varieties such as Standard Italian and French. In particular, the language is traditionally spoken in coastal, northern Tuscany, southern Piedmont (part of the province of Alessandria around the areas of Novi Ligure and Ovada, and the Province of Cuneo in the municipalities of Ormea, Garessio, Alto and Caprauna), western extremes of Emilia-Romagna (some areas in the province of Piacenza), and in Carloforte on San Pietro Island and Calasetta on Sant'Antioco Island off Southwest Sardinia (known as Tabarchino), where its use is ubiquitous and increasing. It is also spoken in the department of the Alpes-Maritimes of France (mostly the Côte d'Azur from the Italian border to and including Monaco), in the town of Bonifacio at the southern tip of the French island of Corsica. It was spoken by a large community in Gibraltar (UK) until about 1970. It has been adopted formally in Monaco under the name Monégasque – locally, Munegascu – but without the status of official language (that is French). Monaco is the only place where a variety of Ligurian is taught in school, being mandatory in ground school.

The Mentonasc dialect, spoken in the East of the County of Nice, is considered to be a transitional Occitan dialect to Ligurian; conversely, Roiasc and Pignasc spoken further North in the Eastern margin of the County are Ligurian dialects with Occitan influences.

== Description ==
Chart of Romance languages based on structural and comparative criteria

As a Gallo-Italic language, Ligurian is most closely related to the Lombard, Piedmontese and Emilian-Romagnol languages, all of which are spoken in neighboring provinces. Unlike the aforementioned languages, however, it exhibits distinct Italian features. No link has, thus far, been demonstrated by linguistic evidence between Romance Ligurian and the Ligurian language of the ancient Ligurian populations, in the form of a substrate or otherwise. Very little is known about ancient Ligurian itself due to the lack of inscriptions and the unknown origin of the Ligurian people. Only onomastics and toponyms are known to have survived from ancient Ligurian, the name Liguria itself being the most obvious example.

== Variants ==
The most important variants of the Ligurian language († = extinct) are:

- Bonifacino (in Bonifacio, Corsica)
- Brigasc (in La Brigue and Briga Alta)
- †Figùn (in Provence)
- Genoese (main Ligurian variant, spoken in Genoa)
  - †Genoese of Gibraltar
  - †Genoese of Nueva Tabarca (Spain)
  - †Genoese Pörtoriàn (in Genoa)
- Intemelio (in Sanremo and Ventimiglia)
- Monégasque (in Monaco)
- Novéize or Oltregiogo Ligurian (North of Genoa, mainly in Val Borbera, Novi Ligure and Ovada)
- Royasc (in Upper Roya Valley, between Italy and France)
- Spezzino (in La Spezia)
- Tabarchino (in Calasetta and Carloforte, Sardinia)
- Tendasc (in Tende)

== Phonology ==
=== Consonants ===
Consonants in the Genovese dialect
| | | Labial | Dental/ Alveolar | Post- alveolar | Palatal | Velar |
|---|---|---|---|---|---|---|
| Stop | voiceless | p | t | | | k |
| Stop | voiced | b | d | | | ɡ |
| Affricate | voiceless | | | t͡ʃ | | |
| Affricate | voiced | | | d͡ʒ | | |
| Fricative | voiceless | f | s | ʃ | | |
| Fricative | voiced | v | z | ʒ | | |
| Nasal | | m | n | | ɲ | ŋ |
| Trill | | | r | | | |
| Approximant | | | l | | j | w |

Semivowels occur as allophones of /i/ and /u/, as well as in diphthongs. /u/ is realized as a semivowel [w] after a consonant, or before a vowel (i.e poeivan [pwejvaŋ]), as well as after /k/, when the sequence is spelled ⟨qu⟩.

=== Vowels ===
| | Front | | Central | Back |
|---|---|---|---|---|
| Close | i iː | y yː | | u uː |
| Mid | e eː | ø øː | | |
| Mid | ɛ ɛː | | | ɔ ɔː |
| Open | | | a aː | |

Diphthong sounds include ⟨ei⟩ [ej] and ⟨òu⟩ [ɔw].

== Orthography ==
No universally accepted orthography exists for Ligurian. Genoese, the prestige dialect, has two main orthographic standards.

One, known as grafia unitäia (unitary orthography), has been adopted by the Ligurian-language press – including the Genoese column of the largest Ligurian press newspaper, Il Secolo XIX – as well as a number of other publishing houses and academic projects. The other, proposed by the cultural association A Compagna and the Academia Ligustica do Brenno is the self-styled grafia ofiçiâ (official orthography). The two orthographies mainly differ in their usage of diacritics and doubled consonants.

The Ligurian alphabet is based on the Latin alphabet, and consists of 25 letters: ⟨a⟩, ⟨æ⟩, ⟨b⟩, ⟨c⟩, ⟨ç⟩, ⟨d⟩, ⟨e⟩, ⟨f⟩, ⟨g⟩, ⟨h⟩, ⟨i⟩, ⟨l⟩, ⟨m⟩, ⟨n⟩, ⟨ñ⟩ or ⟨nn-⟩, ⟨o⟩, ⟨p⟩, ⟨q⟩, ⟨r⟩, ⟨s⟩, ⟨t⟩, ⟨u⟩, ⟨v⟩, ⟨x⟩, ⟨z⟩.

=== Consonants ===
Consonants
| Letter | Context | IPA | Examples |
|---|---|---|---|
| b | everywhere | /b/ | |
| c | before ⟨e⟩ or ⟨i⟩ | /tʃ/ | ciæo 'bright' /tʃɛːu/ |
| c | elsewhere | /k/ | can 'dog' /kaŋ/ |
| ç | generally only appears before ⟨e⟩ or ⟨i⟩ | /s/ | riçetta 'recipe' /riˈsɛtta/ |
| d | everywhere | /d/ | |
| f | everywhere | /f/ | |
| g | before ⟨e⟩ or ⟨i⟩ | /dʒ/ | eugezâ 'catch sight of' /ødʒeˈzaː/ |
| g | elsewhere | /ɡ/ | gànbou 'prawn' /ˈɡaŋbɔw/ |
| h | generally only appears in the sequences ⟨che⟩, ⟨chi⟩, ⟨ghe⟩, and ⟨ghi⟩ | silent | cheu 'heart' /køː/ |
| l | everywhere | /l/ | |
| m | before ⟨b⟩ or ⟨p⟩ | /ŋ/ | tempo 'time' /ˈtɛŋpʊ/ |
| m | elsewhere | /m/ | mi 'I' /mi/ |
| n | before a vowel | /n/ | nòstro 'our' /ˈnɔstru/ |
| n | before a consonant or the end of a word | /ŋ/ | cantón 'corner' /kaŋˈtuŋ/ |
| ñ | before a vowel | /ŋ/ | canpaña 'bell' /kɑŋˈpɑŋŋɑ/, or the feminine indefinite pronoun uña /ˈyŋŋɑ/ |
| p | everywhere | /p/ | |
| q | everywhere | /k/ | |
| r | everywhere | /r/ | |
| s | before a vowel or a voiceless consonant | /s/ | diségno 'design' /diˈseɲɲu/, scöpéllo 'chisel' /skɔːˈpellu/ |
| s | before a voiced consonant | /z/ | sgrêuxo 'mockery' /zɡrøːˈʒu/ |
| t | everywhere | /t/ | |
| v | everywhere | /v/ | |
| x | everywhere | /ʒ/ | vìxita 'visit' /viˈʒita/ |
| z | everywhere | /z/ | câza 'house' /ˈkaːza/ |

The consonant multigraphs are:

- ⟨gn⟩, used for the sound /ɲ/.
- ⟨nn-⟩ (or more rarely ⟨n-n⟩, ⟨n-⟩, ⟨nh⟩, or simply ⟨nn⟩), is used as an alternative to ⟨ñ⟩.
- ⟨sc⟩, used for the sound /ʃ/ when it occurs before ⟨e⟩ or ⟨i⟩.
- ⟨scc⟩ (written as ⟨sc-c⟩ in older orthographies) which indicates the sound /ʃtʃ/.

=== Vowels ===
The ligature ⟨æ⟩ indicates the sound /ɛː/, as in çit(t)æ 'city' /siˈtɛː/.

There are five diacritics, whose precise usage varies between orthographies. They are:

- The acute accent ⟨´⟩, can be used for ⟨é⟩ and ⟨ó⟩ to represent the sounds /e/ and /u/.
- The grave accent ⟨`⟩, can be used on the stressed vowels ⟨à⟩ /a/, ⟨è⟩ /ɛ/, ⟨ì⟩ /i/, ⟨ò⟩ /ɔ/, and ⟨ù⟩ /y/.
- The circumflex ⟨ˆ⟩, used for the long vowels ⟨â⟩ /aː/, ⟨ê⟩ /eː/, ⟨î⟩ /iː/, ⟨ô⟩ /uː/, and ⟨û⟩ /yː/ at the end of a word.
- The diaeresis ⟨¨⟩, used analogously to the circumflex to mark long vowels, but within a word: ⟨ä⟩ /aː/, ⟨ë⟩ /eː/, ⟨ï⟩ /iː/, and ⟨ü⟩ /yː/. It is also used to mark the long vowel ⟨ö⟩ /ɔː/, in any position.

The vowel multigraphs are:

- ⟨eu⟩, used for the sound /ø/.
- ⟨ou⟩, used for the sound /ɔw/.

== Sample text ==
=== Ligurian ===
==== Articolo 1 ====
Tutte e personn-e nascian libere e pæge in dignitæ e driti. Son dotæ de raxon e coscensa e gh'an da agî l'unn-a verso l'atra inte 'n spirito de fradelansa.

==== Articolo 2 ====
Ògni personn-a a gh'à tutti i driti e e libertæ proclamæ inte questa Diciaraçion, sensa nisciunn-a distinçion de razza, cô, sesso, lengoa, religion, òpinion politica ò d'atro tipo, òrigine naçionale ò sociale, poxiçion econòmica, nascimento, ò quæ se segge atra condiçion. Pe de ciù, no se faiâ nisciunn-a diferensa fondâ in sciâ condiçion politica, giuridica ò internaçionale do Paize ò do teritöio a-o quæ e personn-e apartegnan, segge pe-i Paixi indipendenti che pe-i teritöi sott'aministraçion fiduciaia, sens'outonomia, ò sotomissi a ògni atra limitaçion de sovranitæ.

=== Standard Italian ===
==== Articolo 1 ====
Tutti gli esseri umani nascono liberi ed eguali in dignità e diritti. Essi sono dotati di ragione e di coscienza e devono agire gli uni verso gli altri in spirito di fratellanza.

=== English ===
==== Article 1 ====
All human beings are born free and equal in dignity and rights. They are endowed with reason and conscience and should act towards one another in a spirit of brotherhood.

==== Article 2 ====
Everyone is entitled to all the rights and freedoms set forth in this Declaration, without distinction of any kind, such as race, colour, sex, language, religion, political or other opinion, national or social origin, property, birth or other status. Furthermore, no distinction shall be made on the basis of the political, jurisdictional or international status of the country or territory to which a person belongs, whether it be independent, trust, non-self-governing or under any other limitation of sovereignty.

== Vocabulary ==
Some basic vocabulary, in the spelling of the Genoese Academia Ligustica do Brenno:

Ligurian vocabulary with multiple translations
| Ligurian | English | Italian | French | Spanish | Romanian | Catalan | Portuguese |
|---|---|---|---|---|---|---|---|
| péi or péia, pl. péie | pear, pears | pera, pl. pere | poire, pl. poires | pera, pl. peras | pară, pl. pere | pera, pl. peres | pera, pl. peras |
| mei or méia, pl. méie | apple, apples | mela, pl. mele | pomme, pl. pommes | manzana, pl. manzanas | măr, pl. mere | poma, pl. pomes | maçã, pl. maçãs |
| çetrón | lemon | limone | citron | limón | lămâie | llimona/llima | limão |
| fîgo | fig | fico | figue | higo | smochină | figa | figo |
| pèrsego | peach | pesca | pêche | melocotón | piersică | préssec/bresquilla | pêssego |
| frambôasa | raspberry | lampone | framboise | frambuesa | zmeură | gerd | framboesa |
| çêxa | cherry | ciliegia | cerise | cereza | cireașă | cirera | cereja |
| meréllo | strawberry | fragola | fraise | fresa | căpșună | maduixa, fraula | morango |
| nôxe | (wal)nut | noce | noix | nuez | nucă | nou | noz |
| nissêua | hazelnut | nocciola | noisette | avellana | alună | avellana | avelã |
| bricòccalo | apricot | albicocca | abricot | albaricoque | caisă | albercoc | damasco |
| ûga | grape | uva | raisin | uva | strugure | raïm | uva |
| pigneu | pine nut | pinolo | pignon de pin | piñón | sămânță de pin | pinyó | pinhão |
| tomâta | tomato | pomodoro | tomate | tomate | roșie | tomàquet, tomata | tomate |
| articiòcca | artichoke | carciofo | artichaut | alcachofa | anghinare | escarxofa, carxofa | alcachofra |
| êuvo | egg | uovo | œuf | huevo | ouă | ou | ovo |
| cà or casa | home, house | casa | maison, domicile | casa | casă | casa or ca | casa |
| ciæo | clear or light | chiaro | clair | claro | clar | clar | claro |
| éuggio | eye | occhio | œil | ojo | ochi | ull | olho |
| bócca | mouth | bocca | bouche | boca | gură | boca | boca |
| tésta | head | testa | tête | cabeza | cap | cap | cabeça |
| schénn-a | back | schiena | dos | espalda | spate | esquena | costas |
| bràsso | arm | braccio | bras | brazo | braț | braç | braço |
| gànba | leg | gamba | jambe | pierna | picior | cama | perna |
| cheu | heart | cuore | cœur | corazón | inimă | cor | coração |
| arvî | to open | aprire | ouvrir | abrir | a deschide | obrir | abrir |
| serrâ | to close | chiudere | fermer | cerrar | a închide | tancar | fechar |
