= Museum of Civilization =

Museum of Civilization may refer to:

- Canadian Museum of Civilization, the former name of the Canadian Museum of History, a museum in Hull, Gatineau, Quebec
- Musée de la civilisation, a museum in Quebec City
- Museo delle Civiltà, a museum in Rome, Italy
