= National Museum of Oriental Art =

- Museo Nazionale d'Arte Orientale Giuseppe Tucci
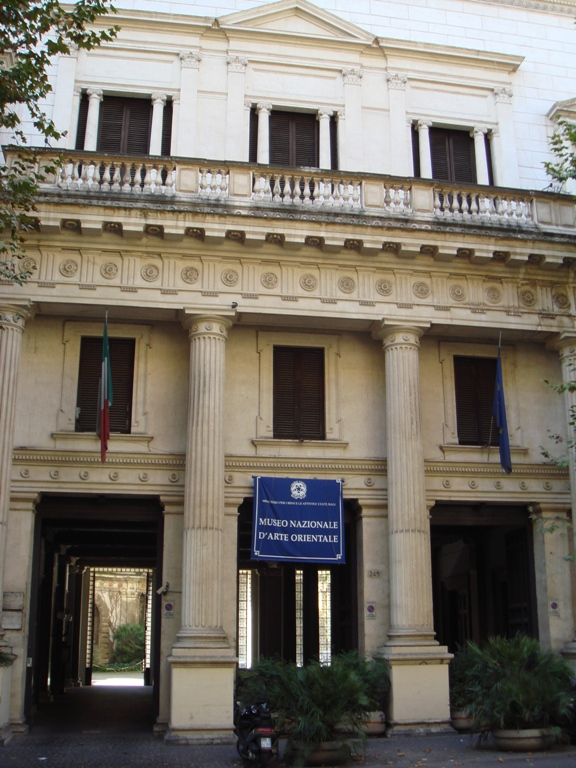
- National Museum of Oriental Art in Rome.
- Click on the map for a fullscreen view
- Established: 1957upright
- Location: Via Merulana, 248, 00185 Rome, Italy
- Coordinates: 41°49′57″N 12°28′18″E
- Type: archaeology, Art museum
- Website: www.museorientale.beniculturali.it

Rome's National Museum of Oriental Art "Giuseppe Tucci" (Italian: Museo Nazionale d'Arte Orientale 'Giuseppe Tucci' ) was a museum in Rome, Italy, that was dedicated to the arts of the Orient, from the Middle East to Japan. The museum was located in Via Merulana 248 in the Rione Esquilino.

== History ==
It was founded in 1957 and closed in 2017, when its collections were transferred to the Pigorini National Museum of Prehistory and Ethnography in the city's southern EUR suburb, and subsequently to the Museo delle Civiltà.

== Collection ==
The museum was founded upon a collection of art objects from Nepal, Tibet and Ladakh that Giuseppe Tucci had acquired during his travels in 1928–1948. Later acquisitions included a notable group of artifacts from the Gandhara area, that had been acquired from the archaeological missions of the Italian Institute for Middle and Far East (IsMEO) to the Buddhist and protohistoric sites of Swat, namely the Butkara Stupa, Barikot, Panr, and Aligrama among others. Other holdings include items from the Palace of Mas'ud III and the Buddhist shrine of Tape Sardar at Ghazni, Afghanistan, and the prehistoric city of Shahr-e Sokhteh, in eastern Iran.

== See also ==
- Italian Institute for Africa and the Orient

Preceded by Museum of the Liberation of Rome	Landmarks of Rome; National Museum of Oriental Art	Succeeded by Palazzo delle Esposizioni
