= Museo delle Civiltà =

Museum in Rome, Italy

Museum of Civilisations
- Museo delle Civiltà
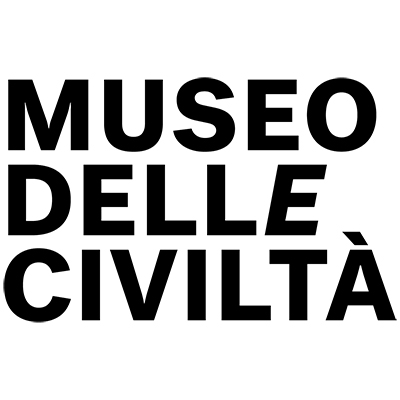

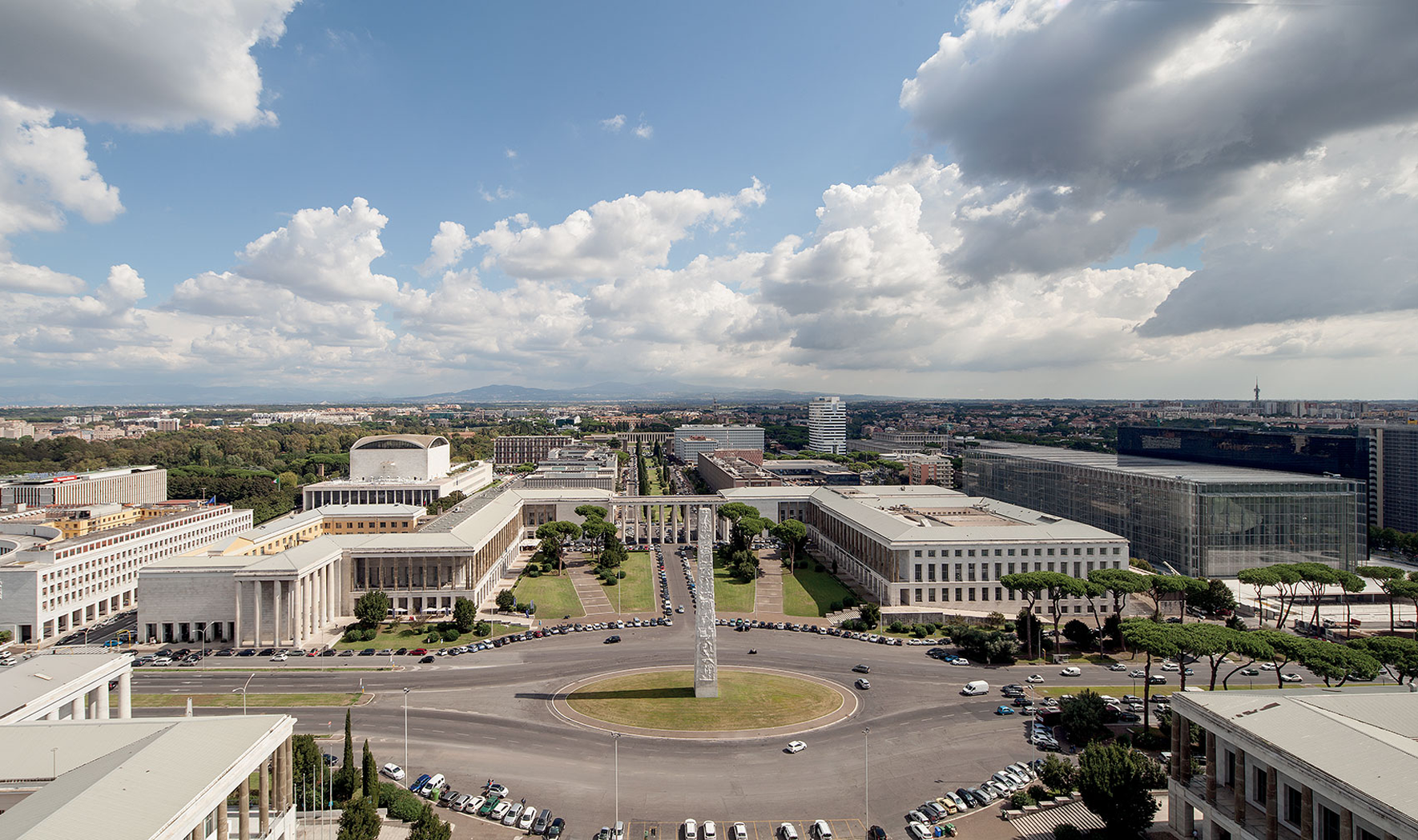
- Panoramic view from above of Piazza Guglielmo Marconi and the Museum of Civilisations (EUR, Rome)
- Established: 2016
- Location: Piazza Guglielmo Marconi 14, 00144 Roma
- Coordinates: 41°49′57.37″N 12°28′17.45″E
- Type: Art, History, Ethnology, Anthropology, Paleontology, Lithology, Mineralology
- Collections: Prehistory; African, American, Asian and Oceanian Arts and Cultures; Popular Arts and Traditions; Early Medieval Finds; Finds of Colonial Origin; Paleontological and Litho-Mineralogical Collections
- Visitors: 39,946 (2023)
- Founder: Dario Franceschini
- Executive director: Andrea Viliani
- Owner: Ministry of Culture (Italy)
- Public transit access: EUR Fermi (Rome Metro)

The Museo delle Civiltà (Italian for 'Museum of Civilisations') is an Italian state museum in the EUR district of Rome.

== History and structure ==
The museum was created in 2016 following three decrees by the Minister for Cultural Heritage and Activities and Tourism, Dario Franceschini. The new institute brought together within a single administration, with special autonomy, the collections of four national museums that had been separate until then, three of which were already located in their respective locations in Piazza Guglielmo Marconi, namely:

- National Museum of Prehistory and Ethnography (Museo nazionale preistorico etnografico)
- National Museum of Popular Arts and Traditions (Museo nazionale delle arti e tradizioni popolari)
- National Museum of the Early Middle Ages (Museo nazionale dell'Alto Medioevo)
- National Museum of Oriental Art (Museo nazionale d'arte orientale)

These were later joined by the collections of two other dissolved museums, namely the African Museum (Museo africano) and the National Geological Museum (Museo geologico nazionale).

Initially, the Museum of Civilisations was intended as a "museum of museums", maintaining a formal distinction between the six institutes and naming them after their respective founders or in any case significant figures for their areas of expertise (respectively Luigi Pigorini, Lamberto Loria, Alessandra Vaccaro, Giuseppe Tucci, Ilaria Alpi and Quintino Sella).

These criteria, however, were changed in 2022 under the directorship of Andrea Viliani, who took office at the beginning of the year and proposed a different approach by promoting the integration of the collections with an interdisciplinary perspective, and the creation of a modern anthropological museum.

== Buildings and collections ==
The museum is housed in two rationalist-style buildings, connected by an imposing colonnade and designed – like the entire EUR district – to host the 1942 Universal Exhibition E42 ("Esposizione 1942"), which never took place due to the outbreak of the Second World War.

The Museum of Popular Arts and Traditions is located in the Palace of Popular Traditions (Palazzo delle tradizioni popolari), specifically designed to house its exhibits: they were in fact supposed to constitute the Exhibition of Popular Arts and Traditions ("Mostra delle arti e tradizioni popolari") during E42. However, the museum only opened in 1956.

The Prehistory and Ethnography Museum and the Museum of the Early Middle Ages have been located since 1967 in the contemporary Palace of Sciences (Palazzo delle Scienze), originally designed and built to host the Universal Science Exhibition ("Mostra della scienza universale") during E42.

The collections of the other museums that merged into the Museum of Civilisations were then placed in the same building:

- the National Museum of Oriental Art, formerly located in Palazzo Brancaccio in the Esquilino district
- the former Colonial Museum (Museo colonial - the now dissolved African Museum), which exhibited artefacts linked to Italian colonialism, for which a critical and decolonial exhibition is currently underway
- finally, following an agreement between the Higher Institute for Environmental Protection and Research (ISPRA) and the Museum of Civilisations, the geo-paleontology and litho-mineralogy collections of the former National Geological Museum (previously in Palazzo Canevari in the Sallustiano district) have also been transferred here. An initial layout of the ISPRA collections was presented in December 2022 and their integration will be completed by the end of 2024.

== Directors ==
Since its founding, the museum has been directed by:

- Leandro Ventura (1 September 2016 - 9 April 2017)
- Filippo Maria Gambari (10 April 2017 - 19 November 2020)
- Loretta Paderni (interim)
- Andrea Viliani (since 26 January 2022)

== Gallery of exhibits ==
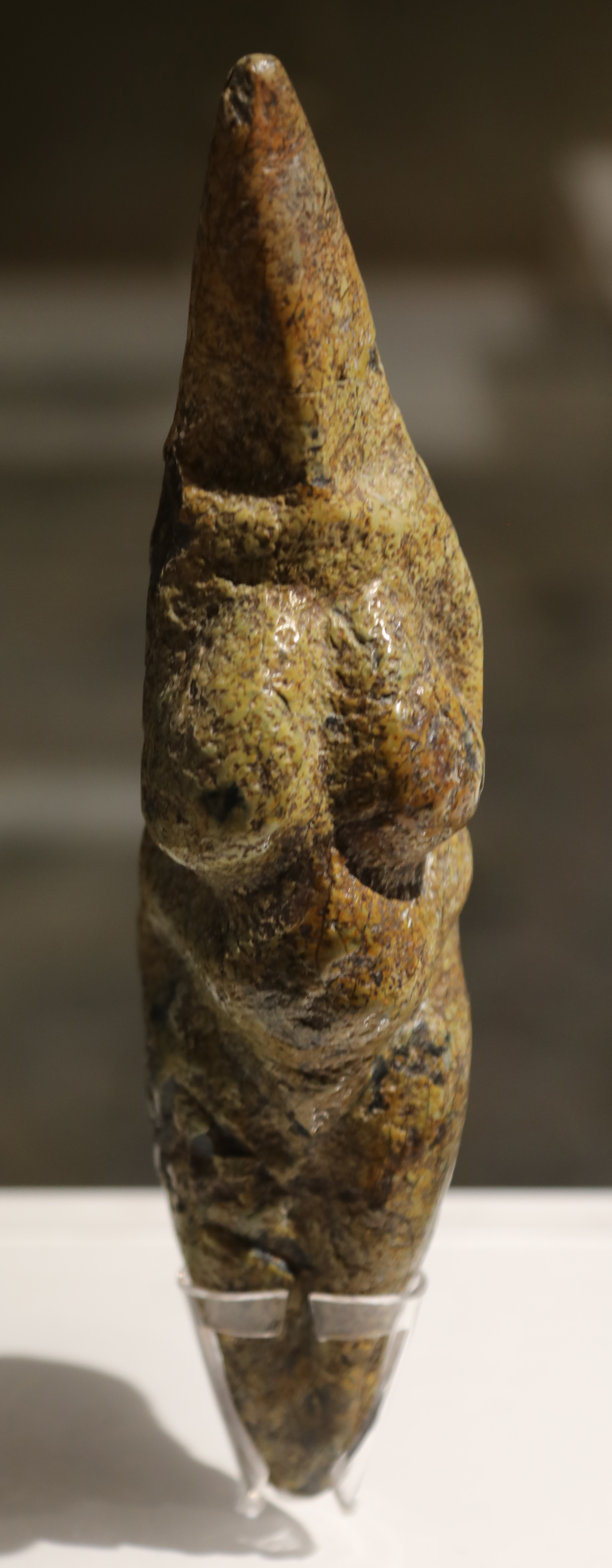
Venus of Savignano - Upper Paleolithic

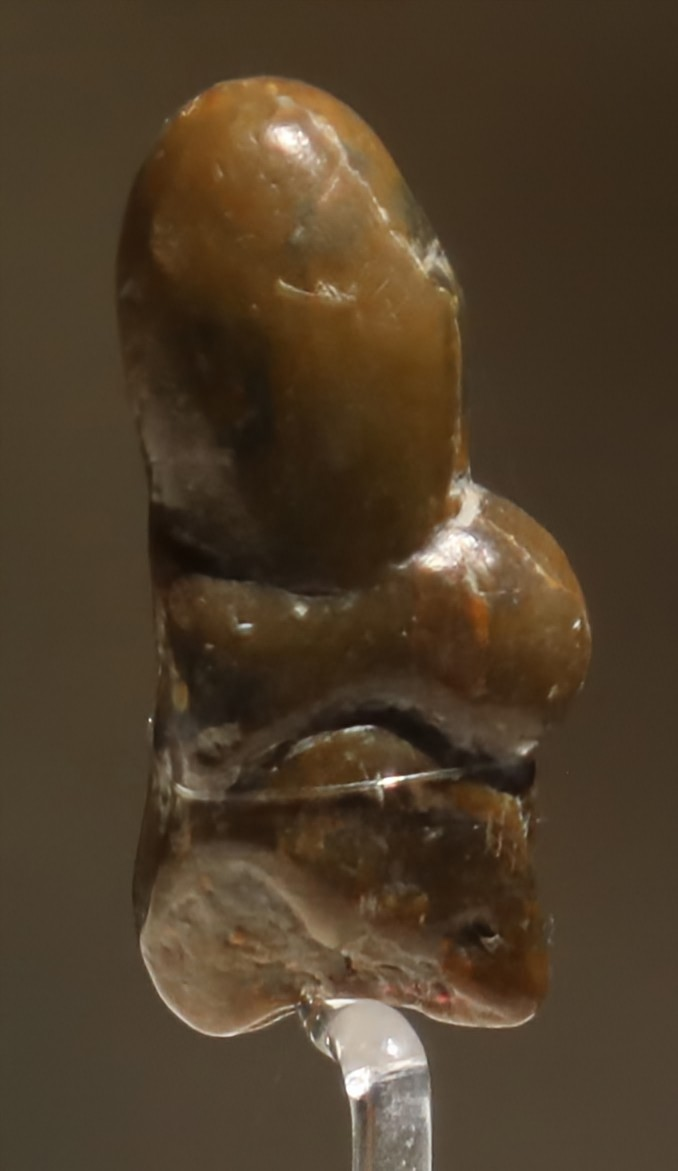
Venus of Trasimeno

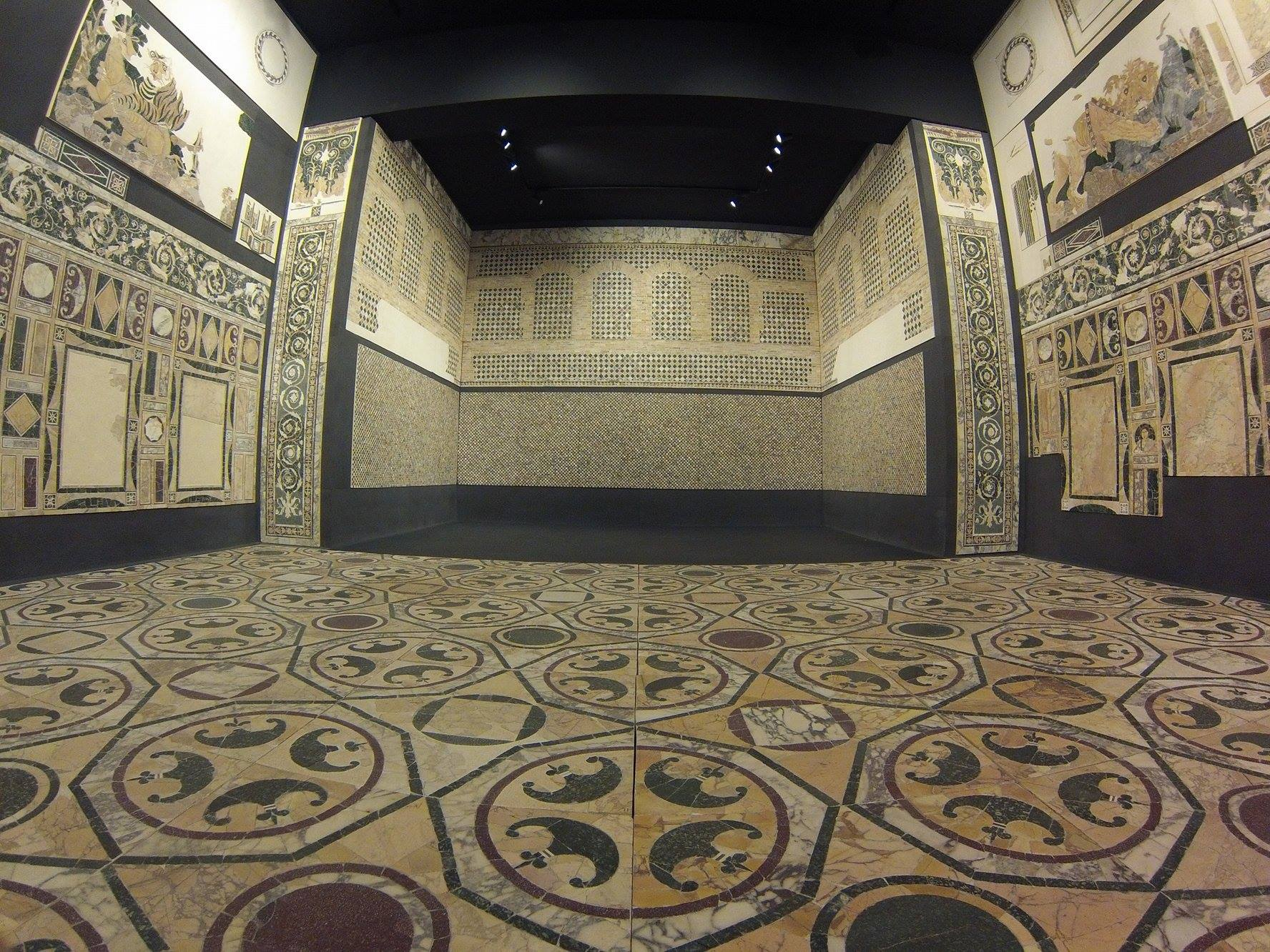
House in opus sectile from Porta Marina - Ostia Antica, late 4th century AD

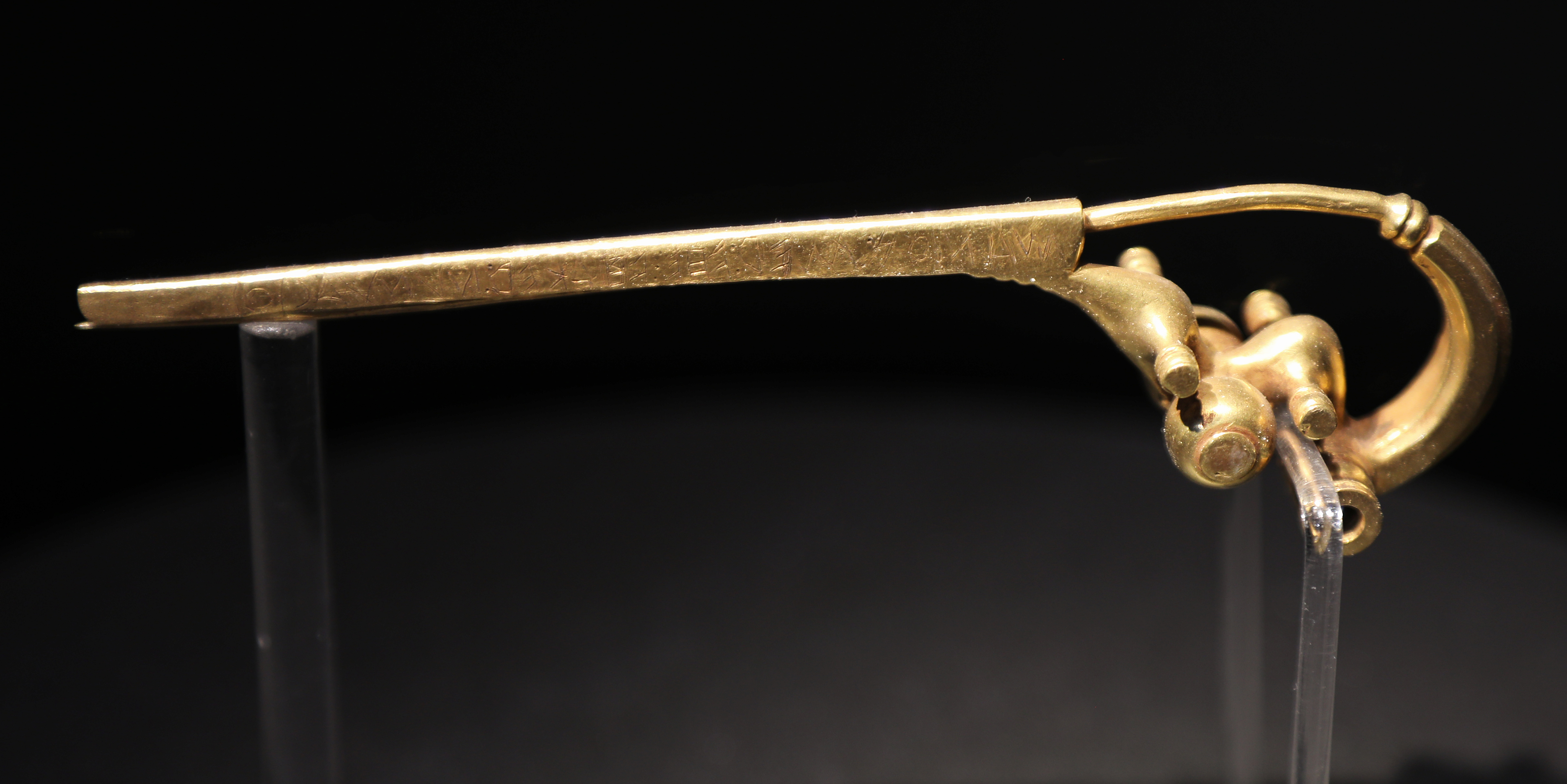
Praeneste fibula - middle of the 7th century BC

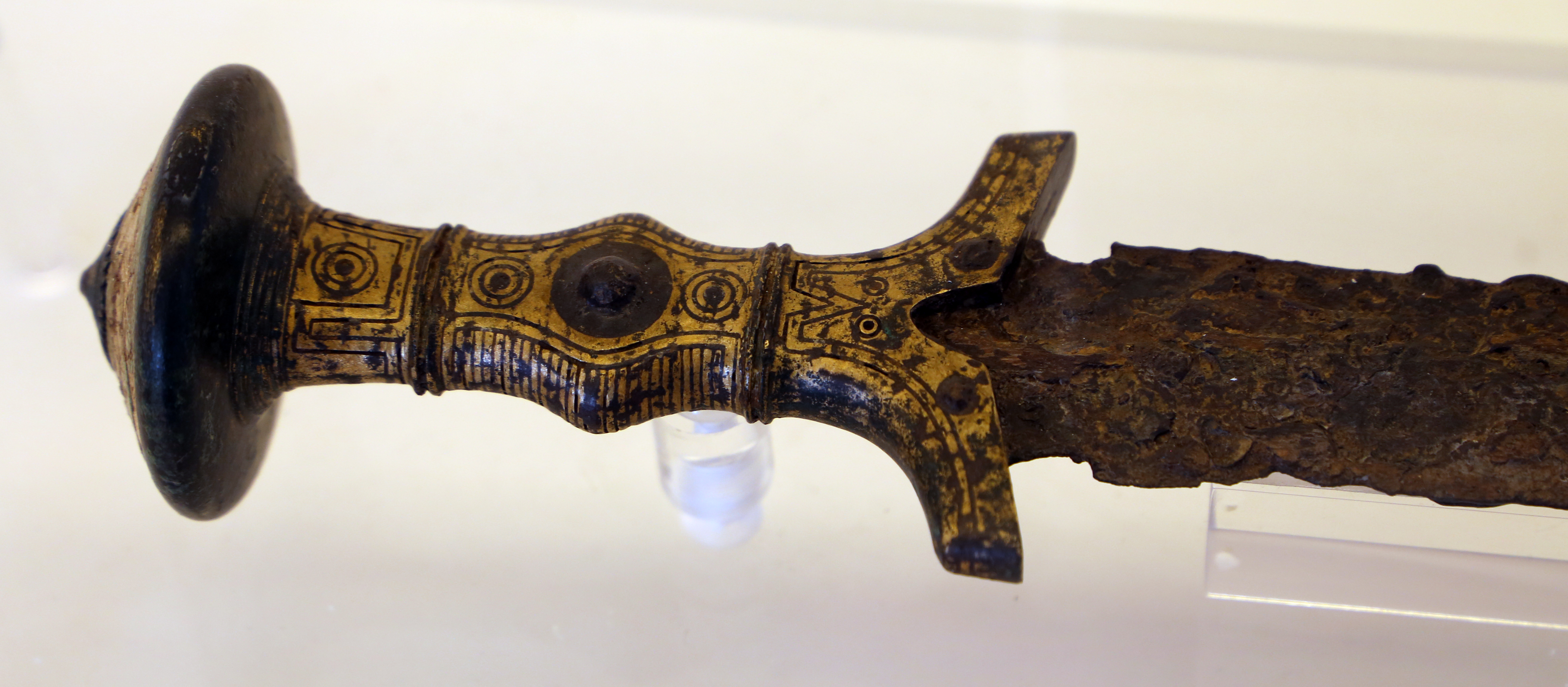
Central European type sword with ivory pommel - from a tomb in Rivoli Veronese, 8th century BC

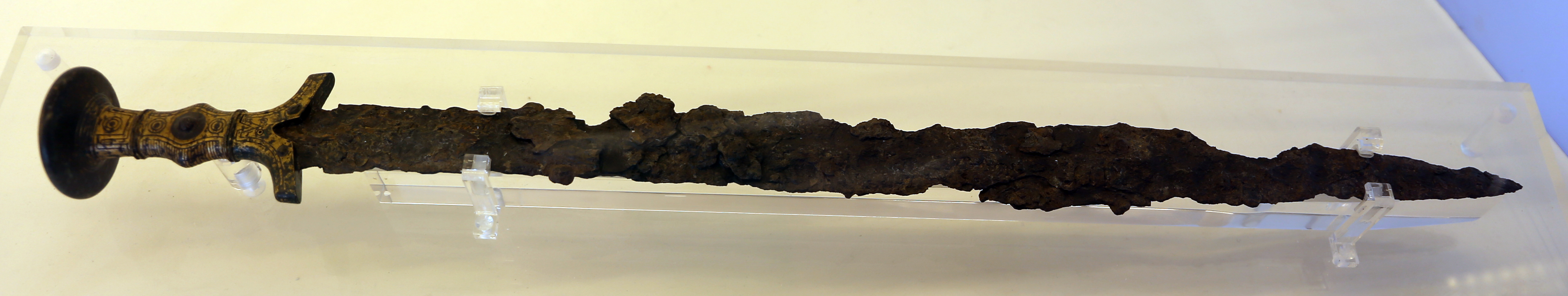
Central European type sword with ivory pommel - from a tomb in Rivoli Veronese, 8th century BC

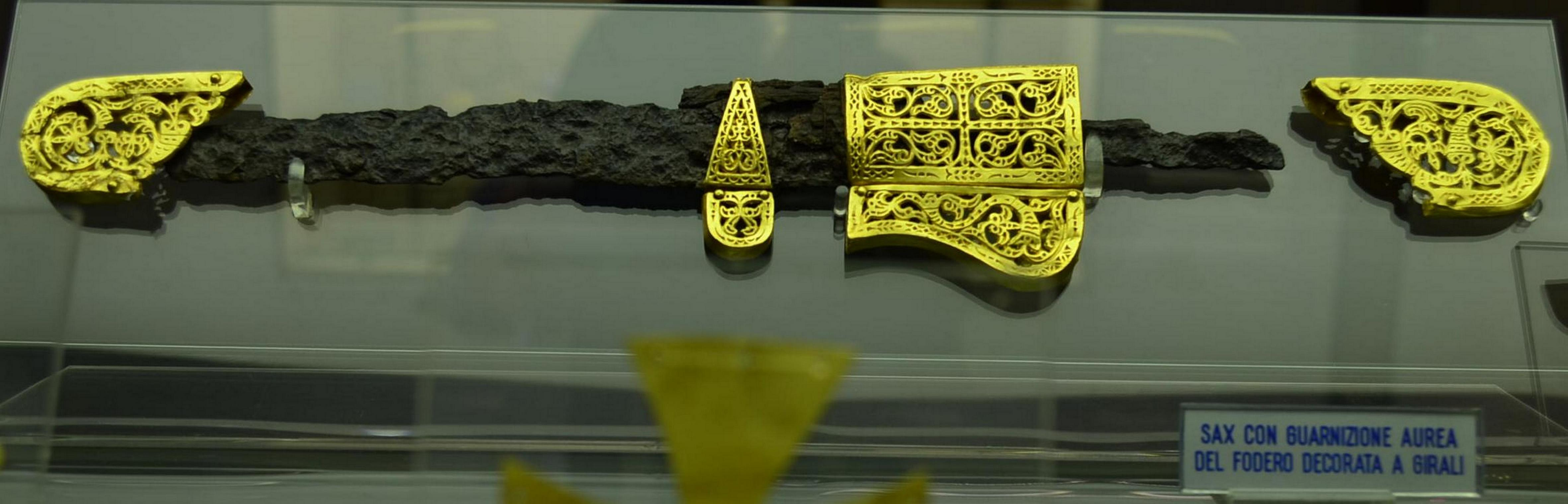
Iron seax decorated with gold leaf

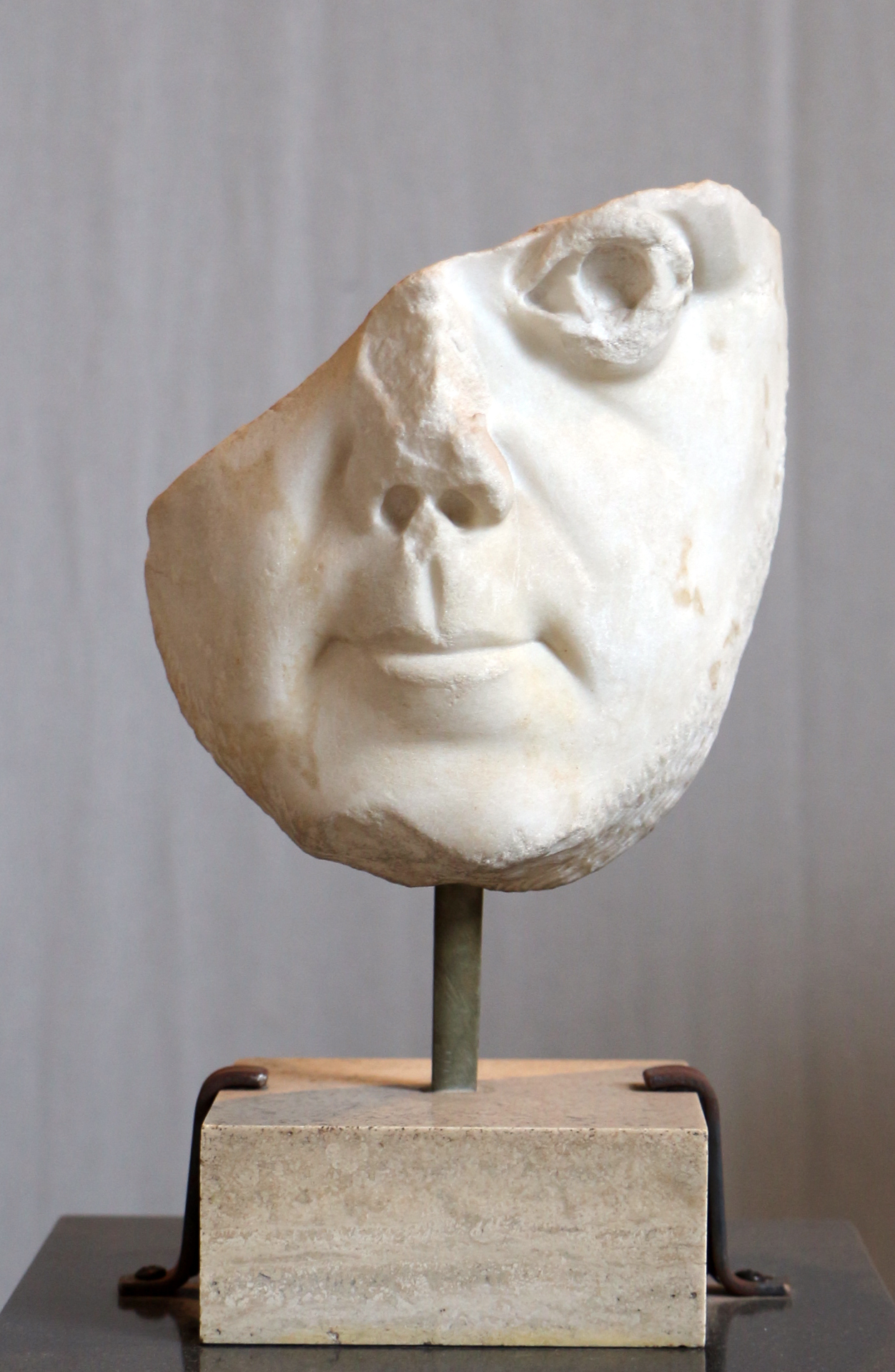
Fragmentary male portrait - 500/550 AD

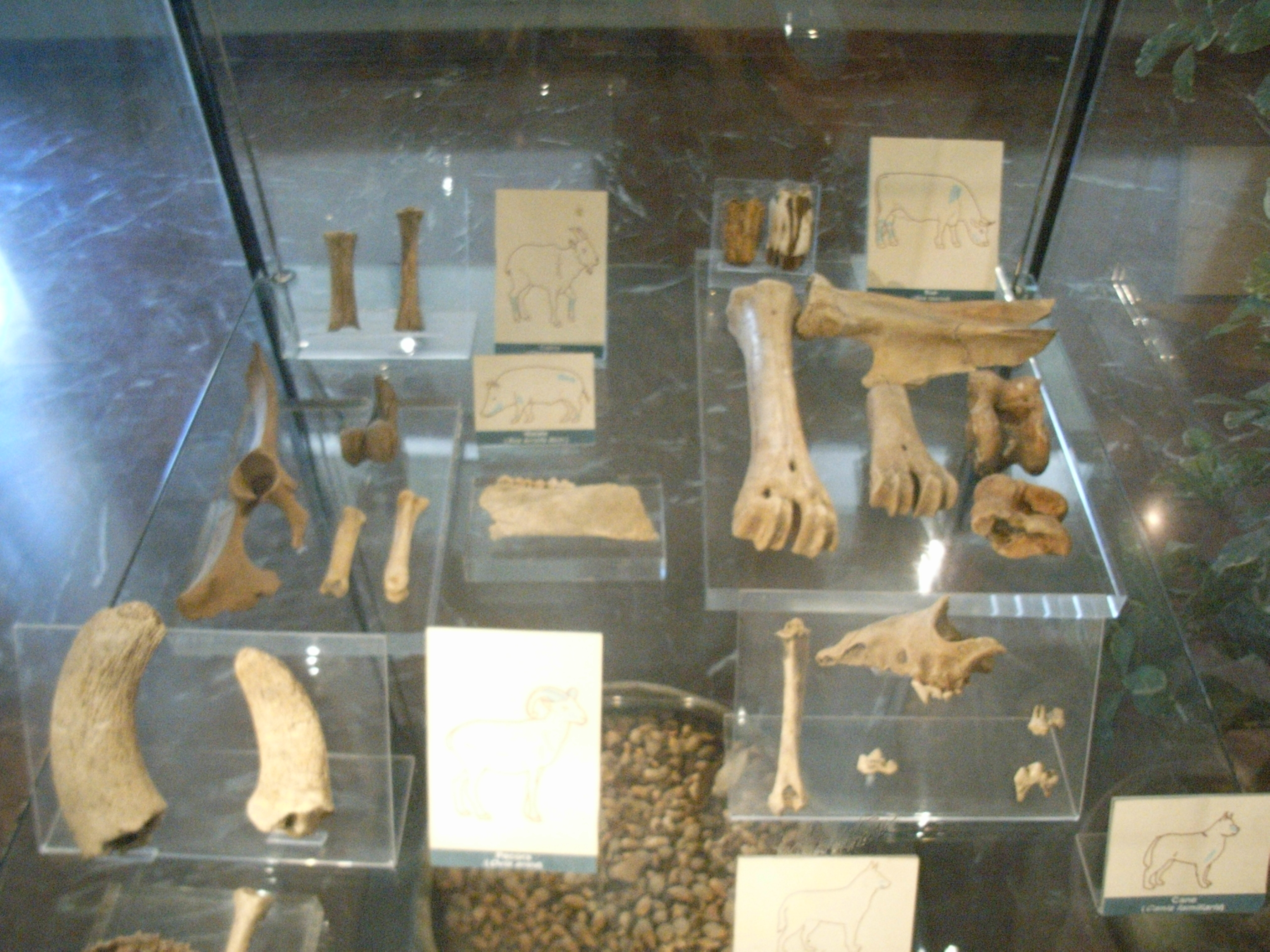
Paleontological finds

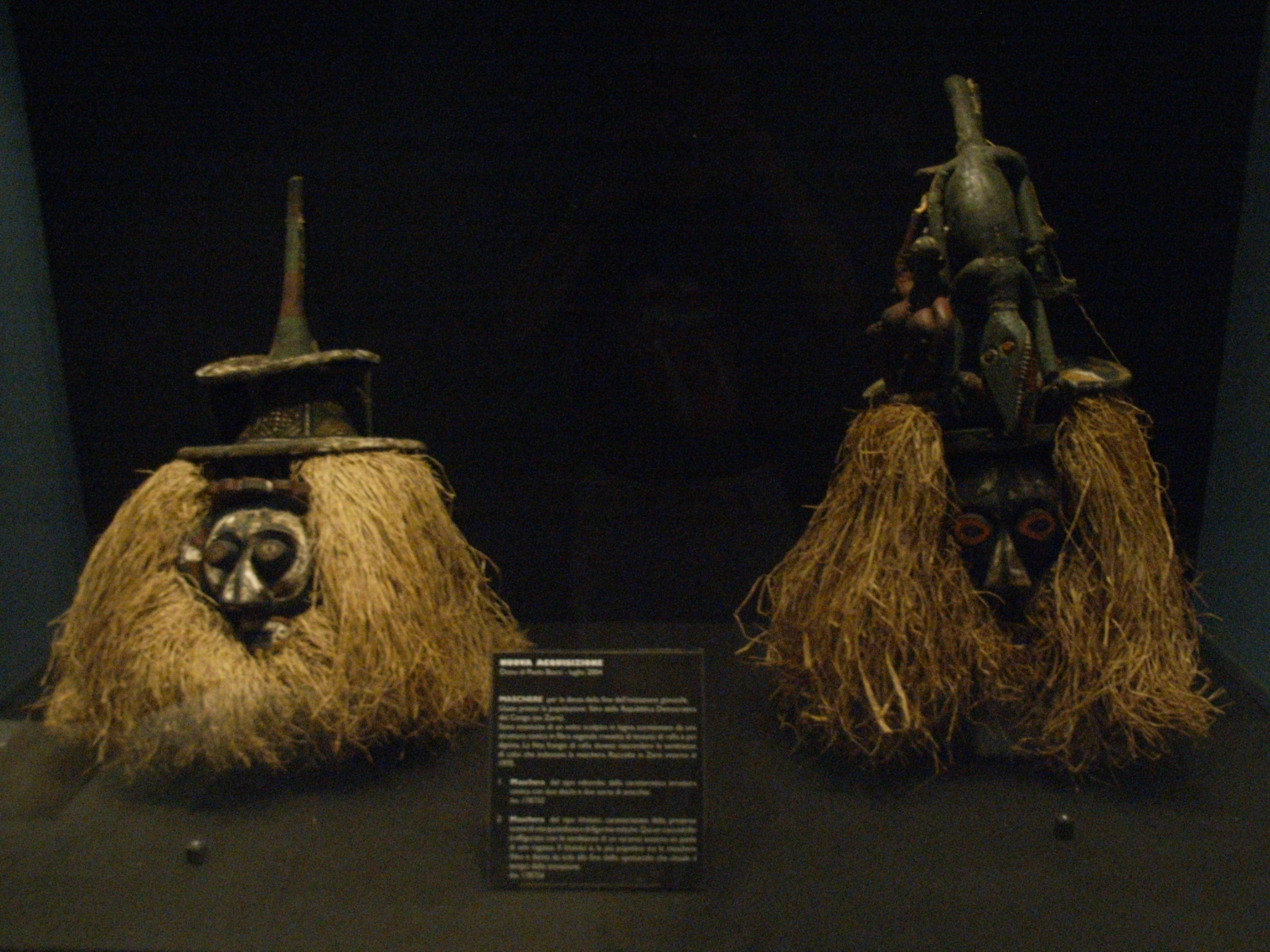
African mask

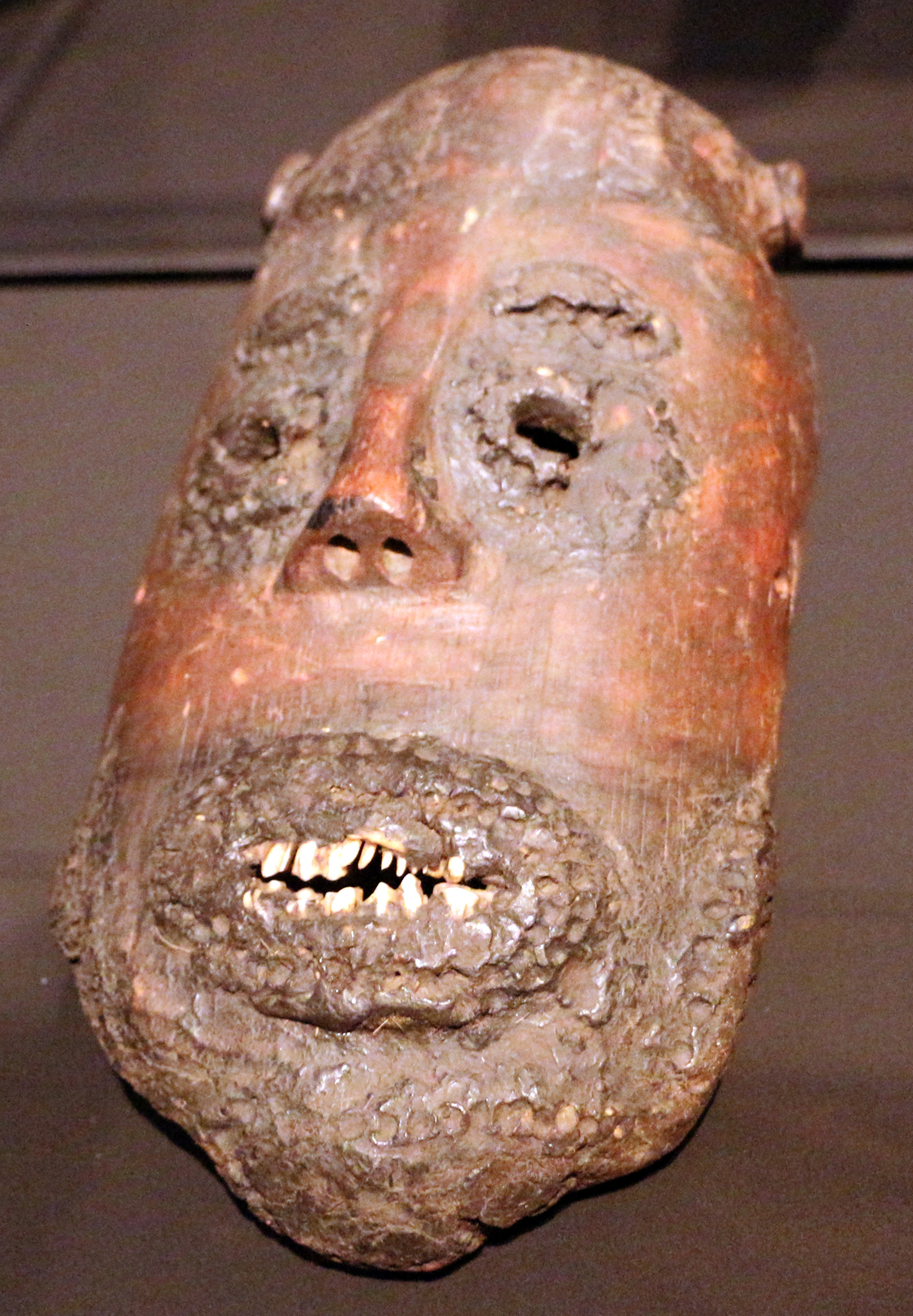
Mask, Kongo-Yombe, Congo, 19th century

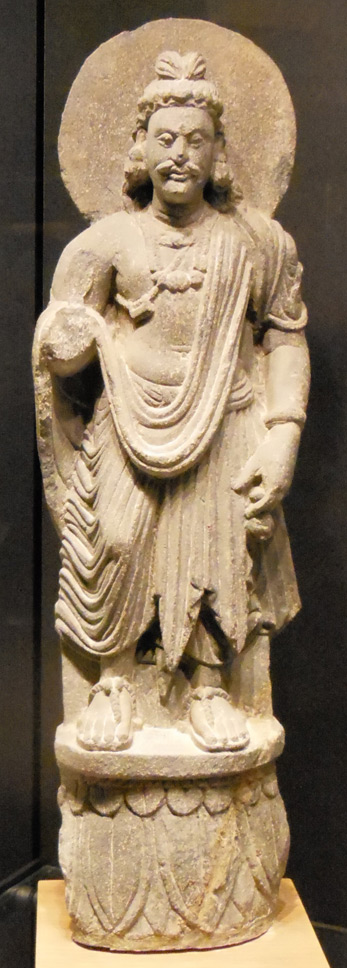
Statue of Maitreya – art of Gandhara

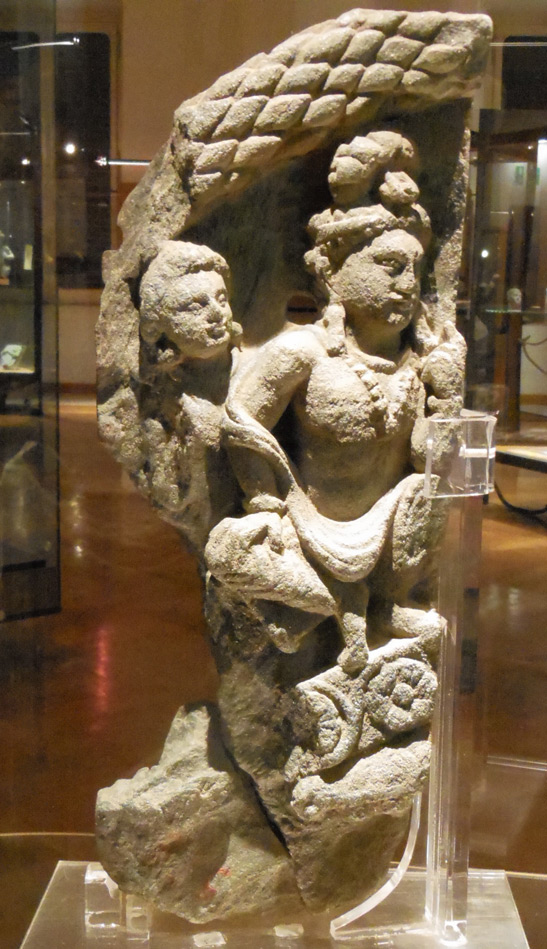
Double-sided relief – art of Gandhara

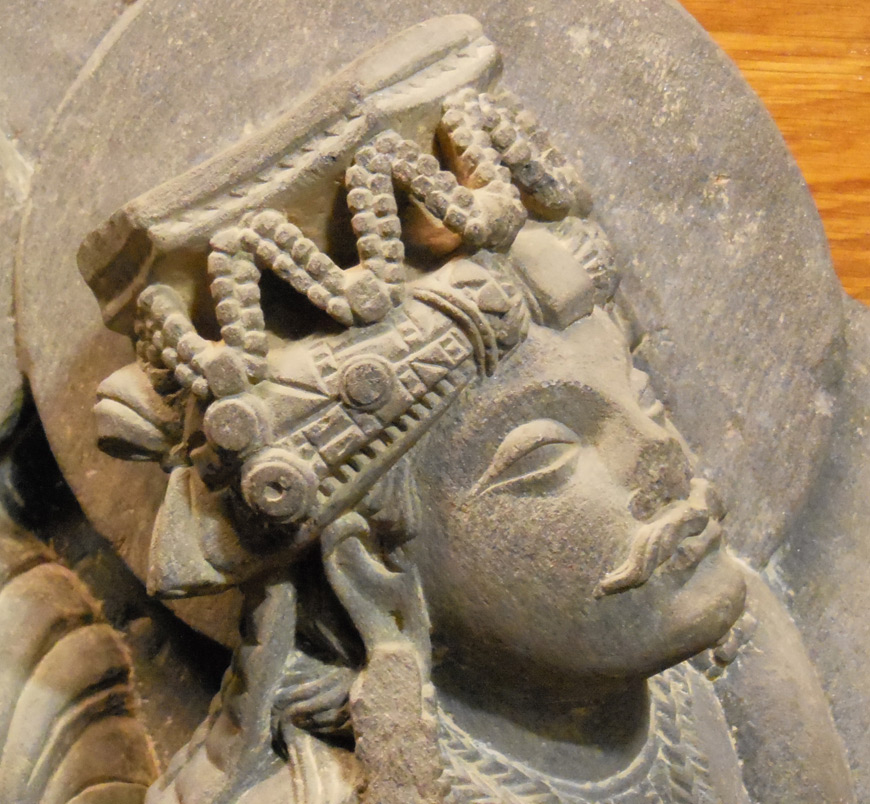
Relief – art of Gandhara

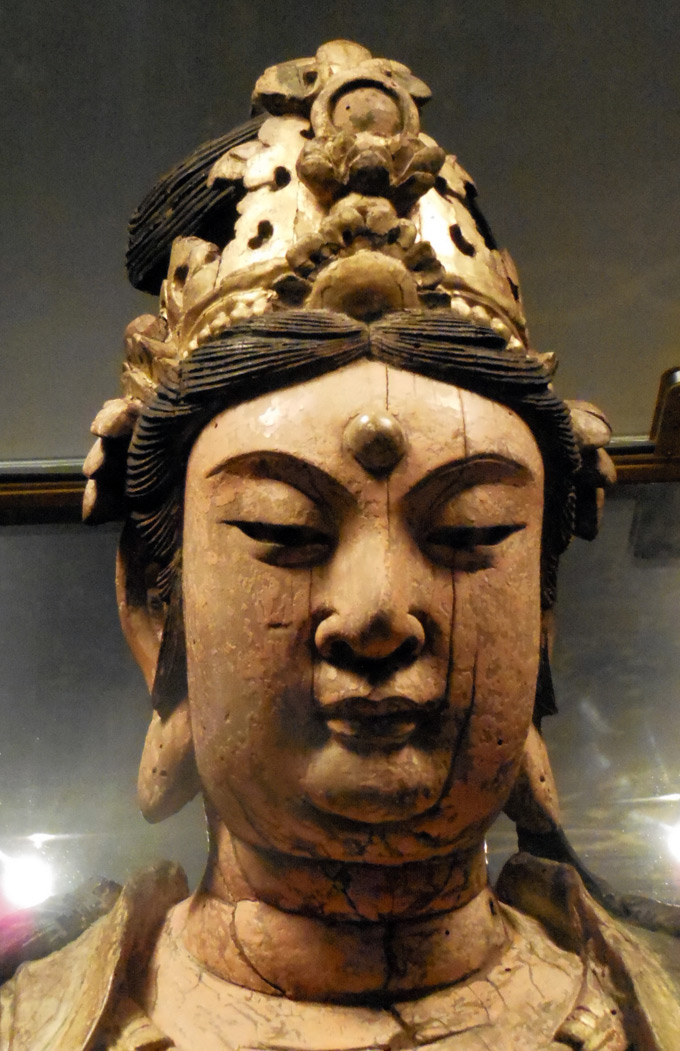
Statue of Guanyin - China, Song or Jin dynasty

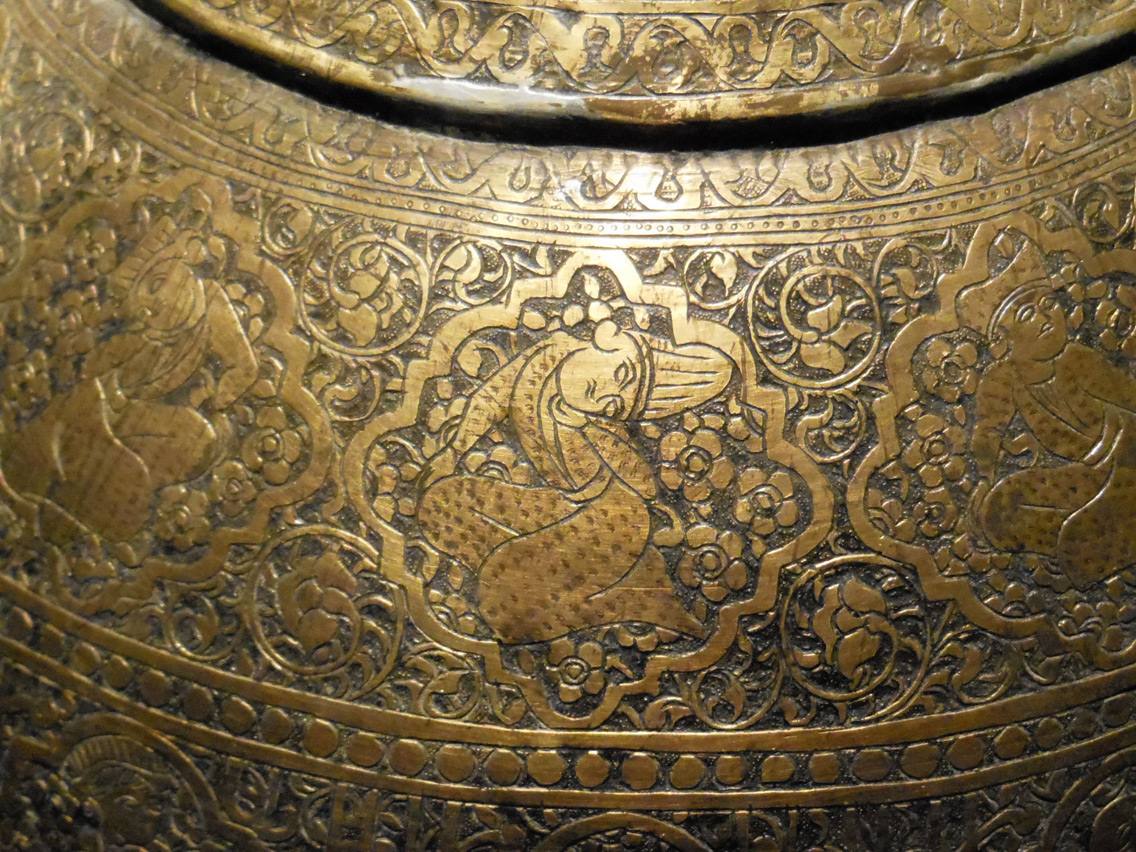
Perfume burner - Iran, 19th century

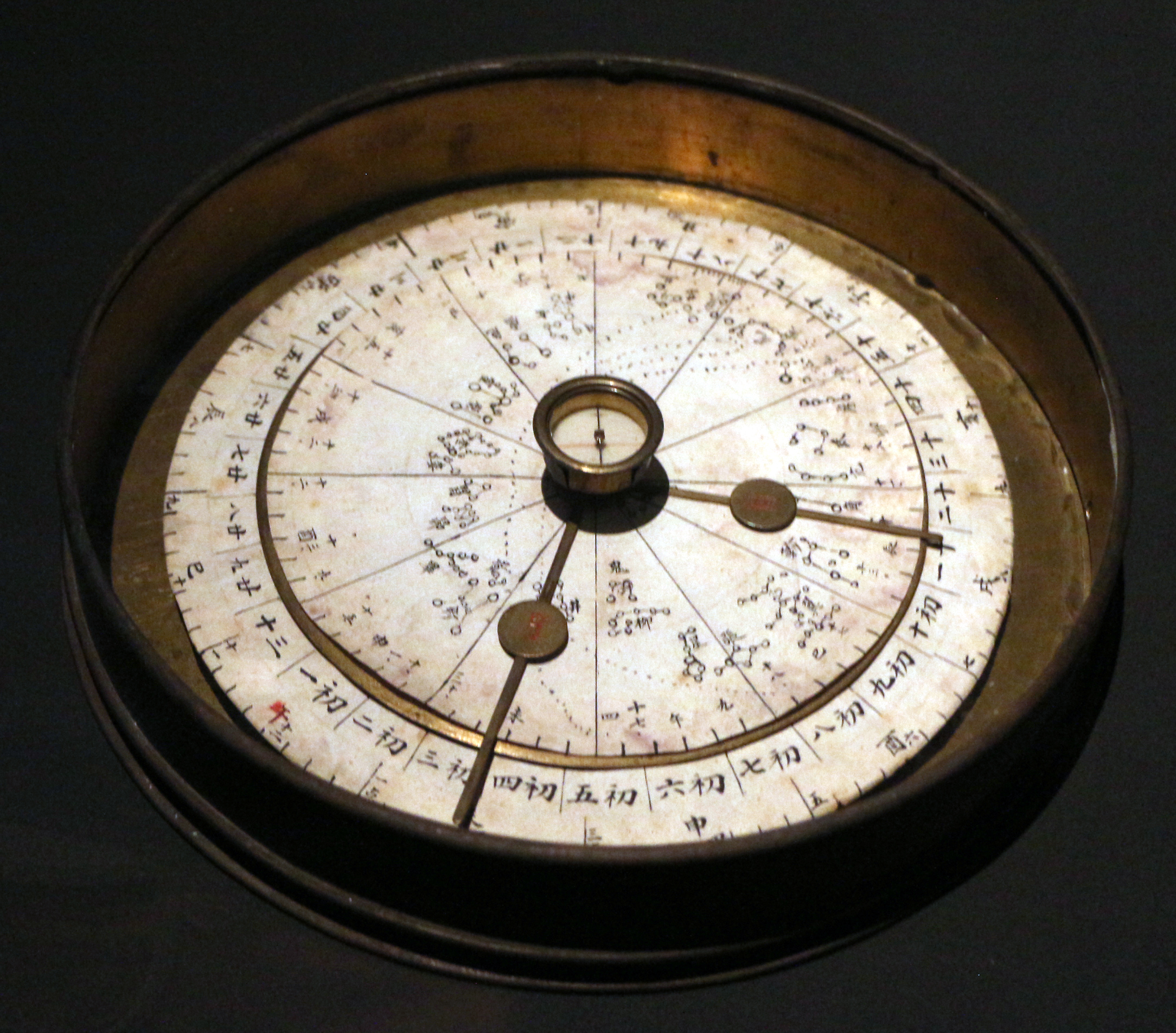
Constellation compass – 19th century

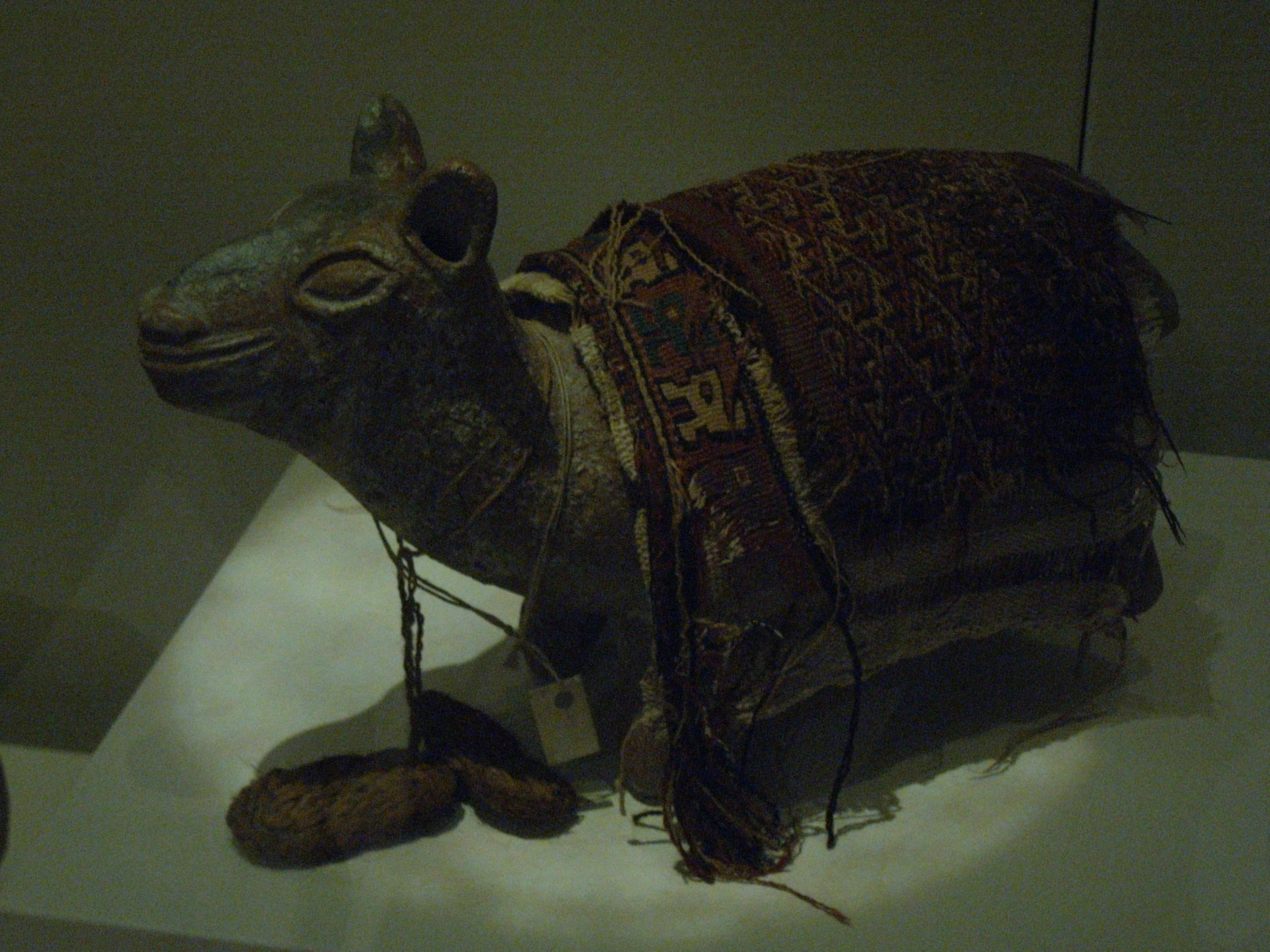
Llama - South America

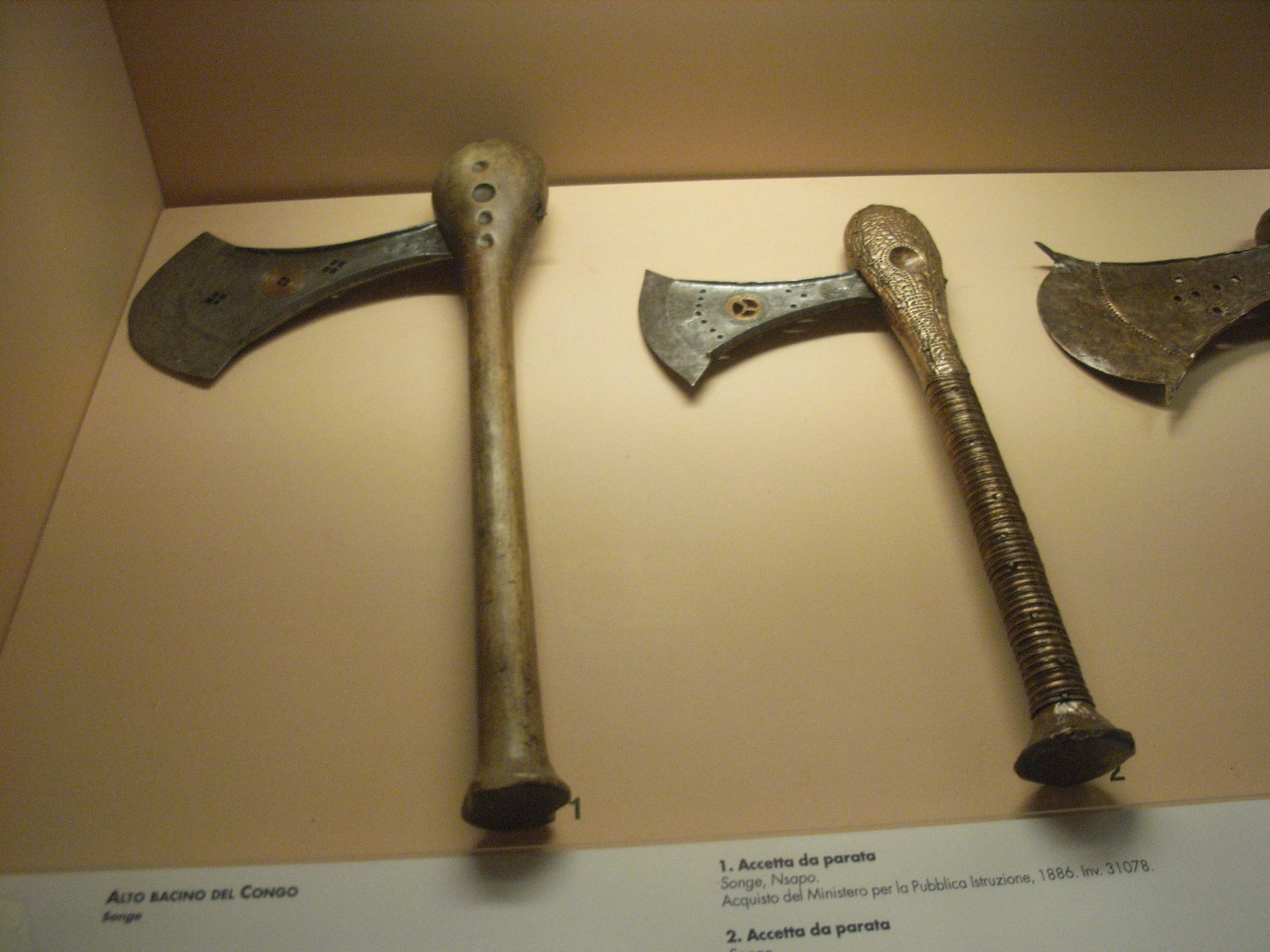
African hatchets - upper Congo Basin

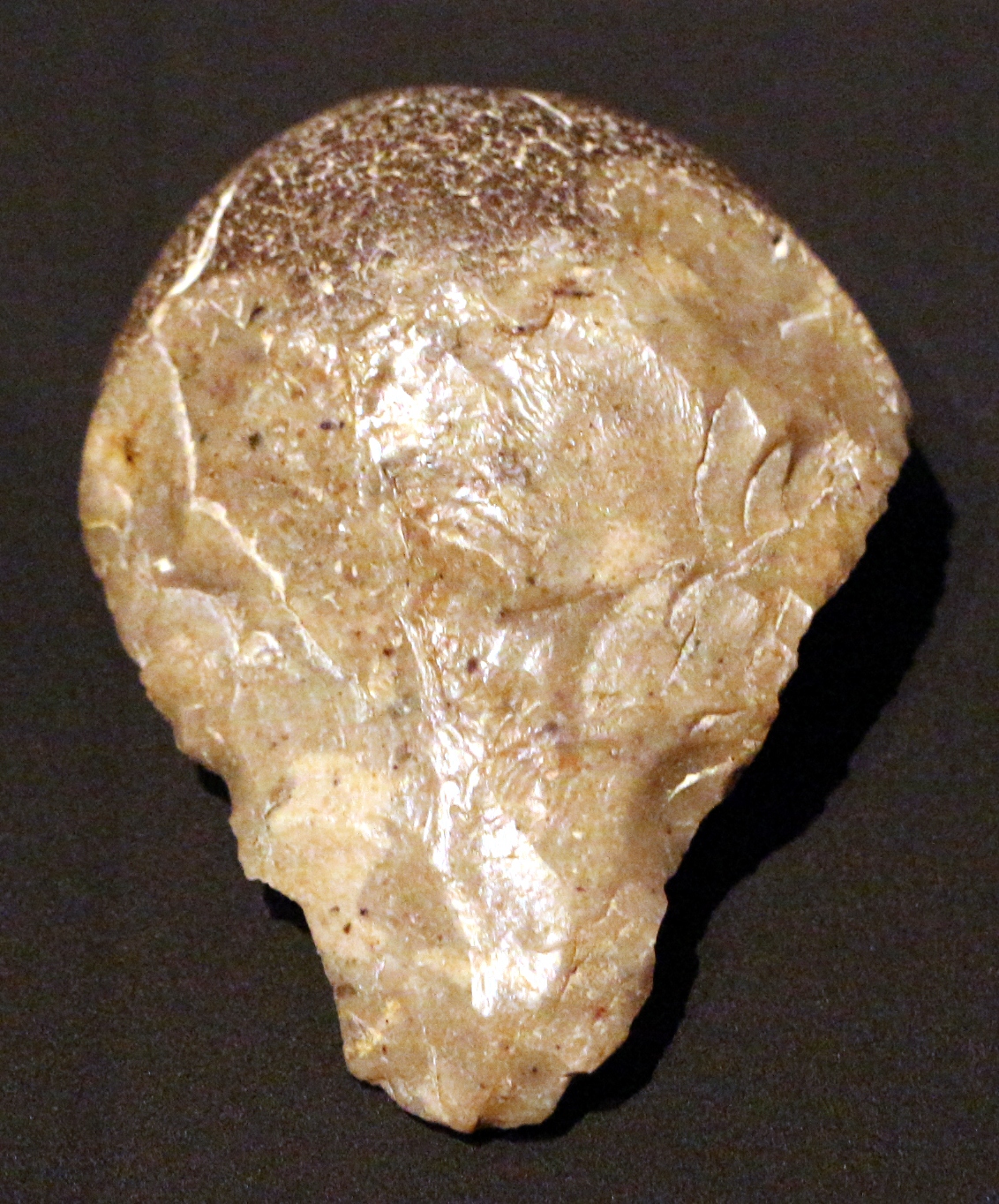
Stone tool – 300,000/250,000 BC

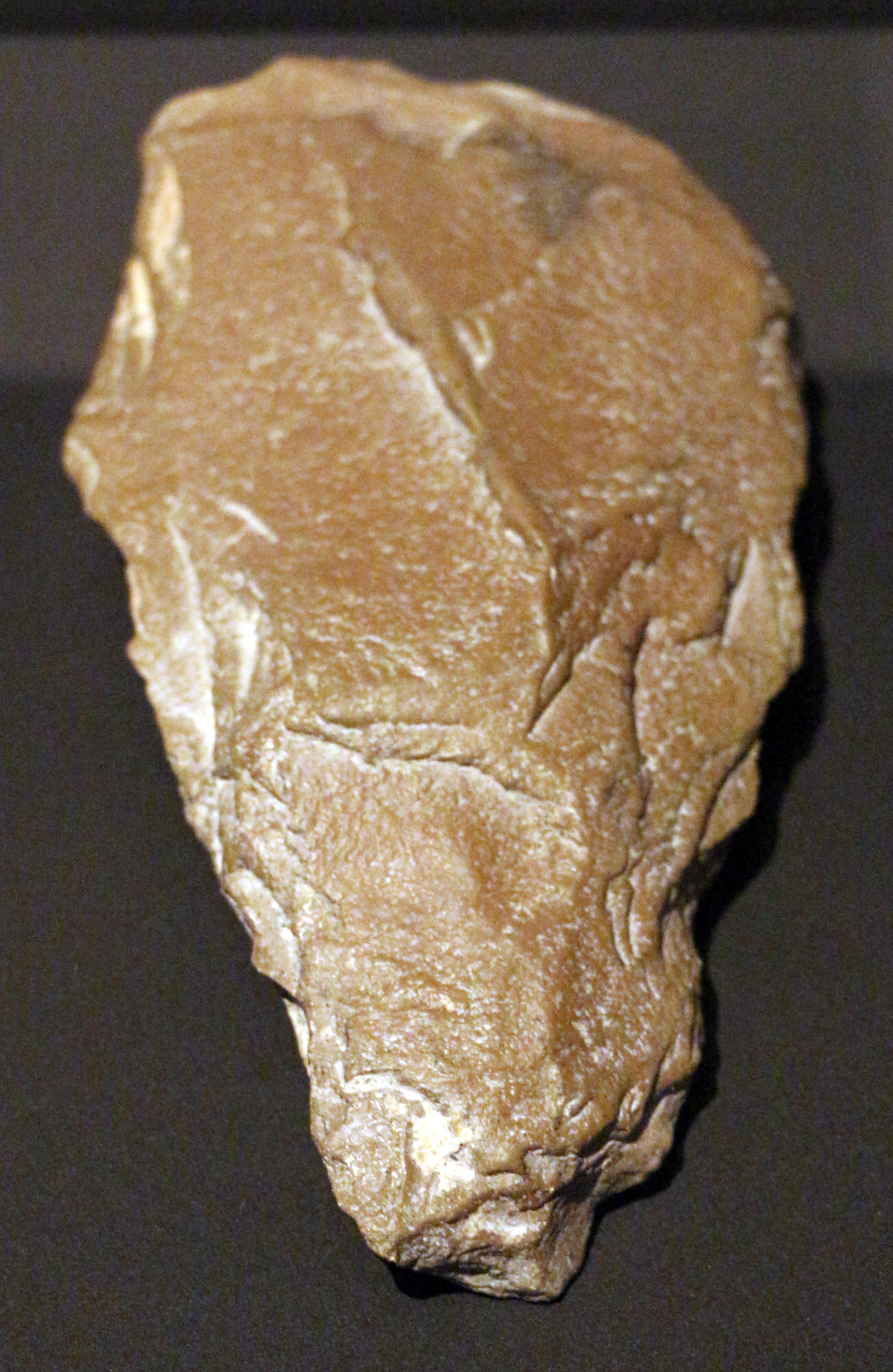
Stone tool - 300,000/250,000 BC

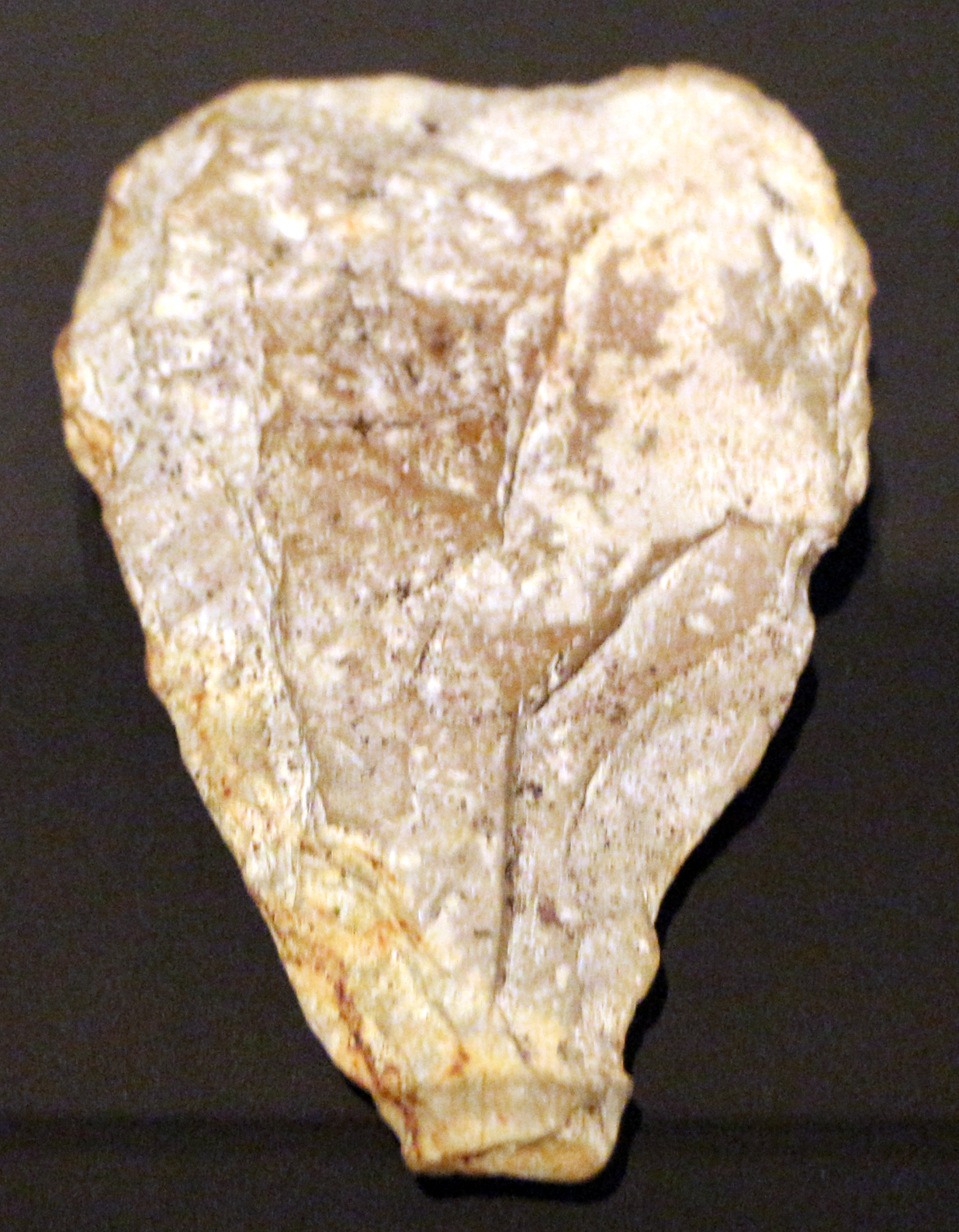
Stone tool - 300,000/250,000 BC

== Gallery ==
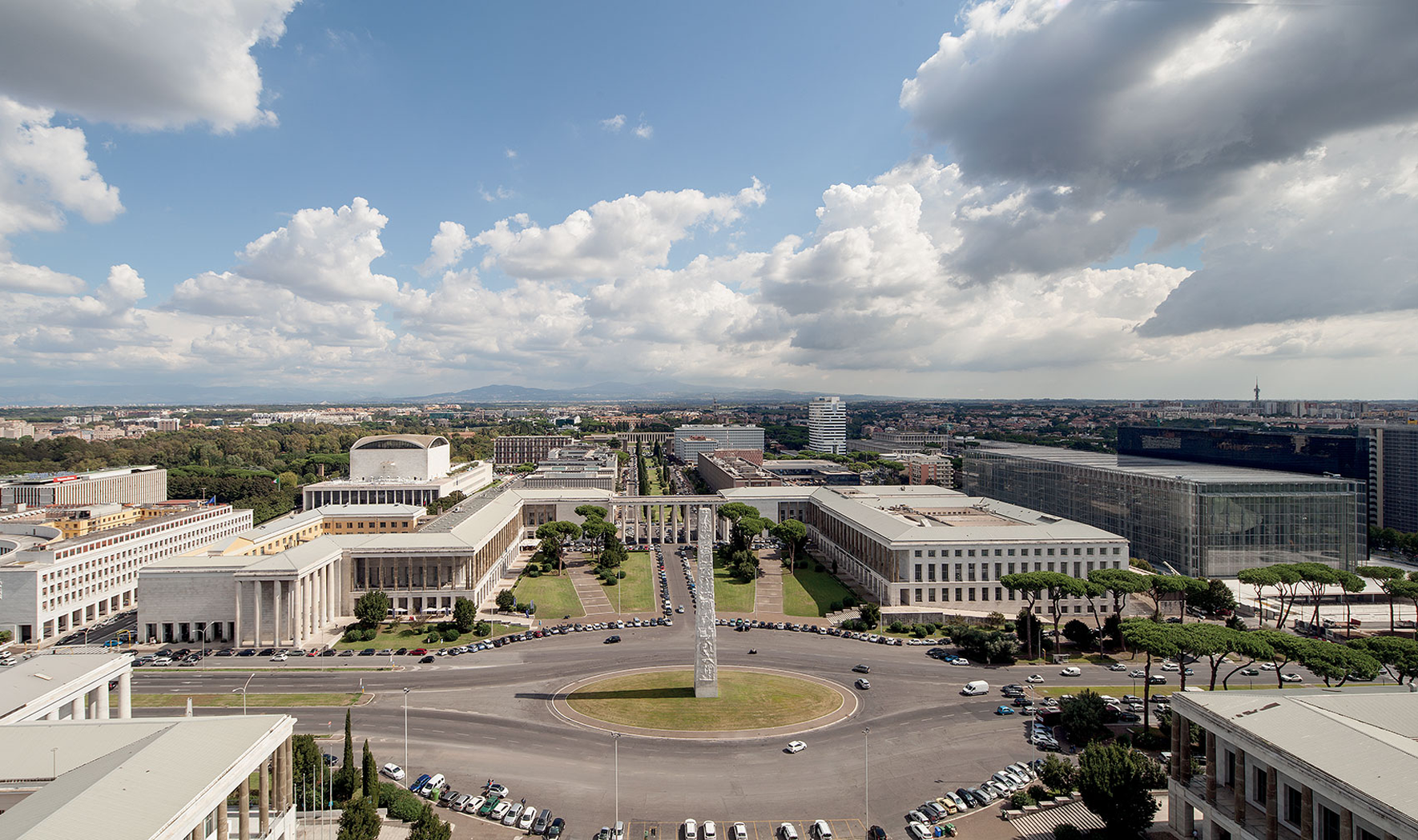
Panoramic view from above of Piazza Guglielmo Marconi and the Museum of Civilisations (photo by Andrea Ricci)

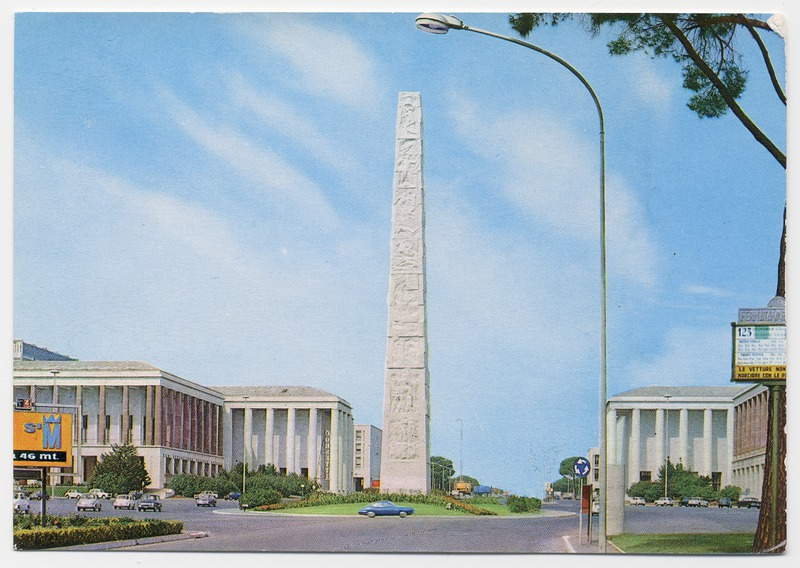
Piazza Guglielmo Marconi: Museum of Civilisations on the right (1967)

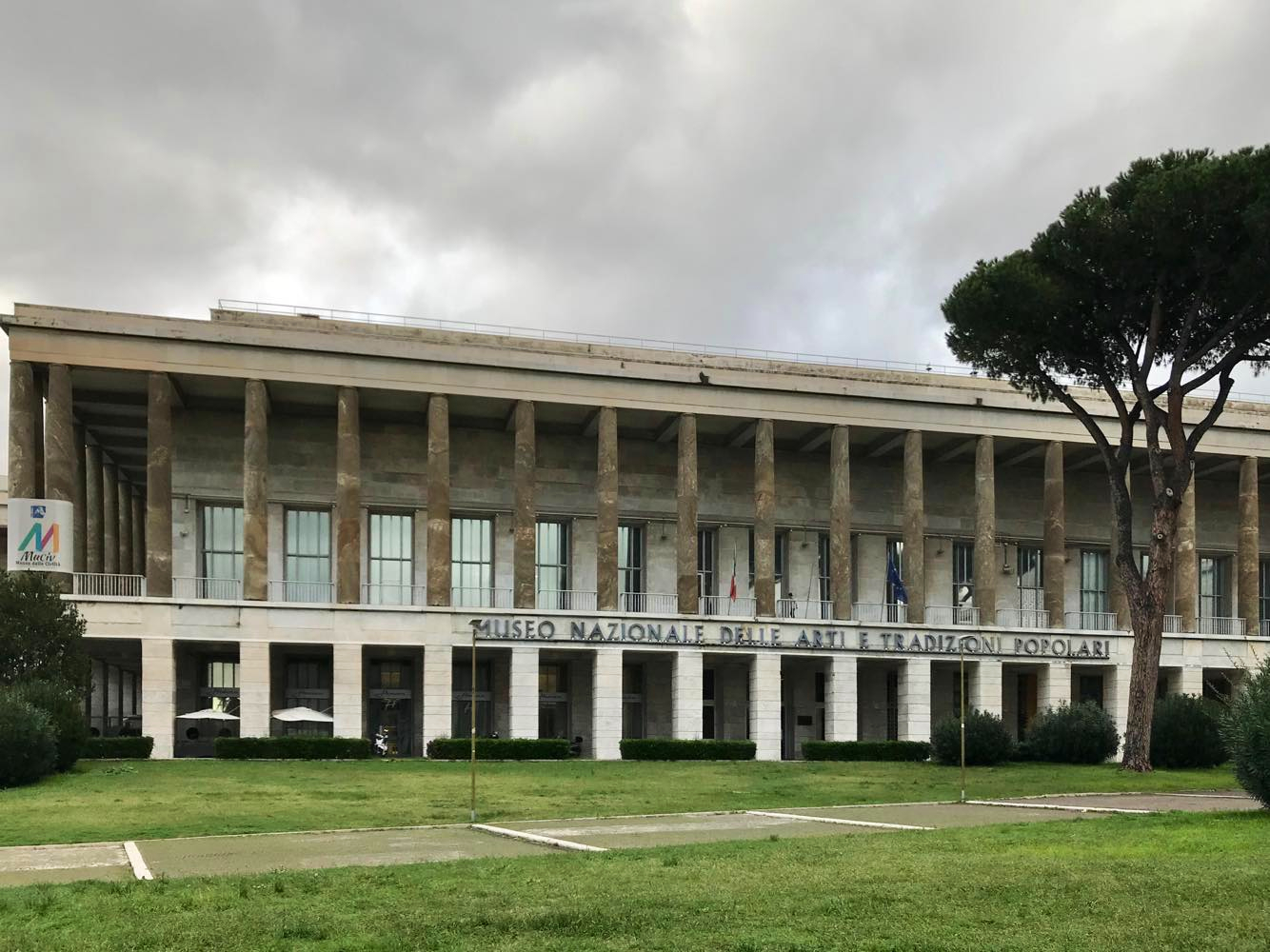
Palace of Popular Arts and Traditions (2019)

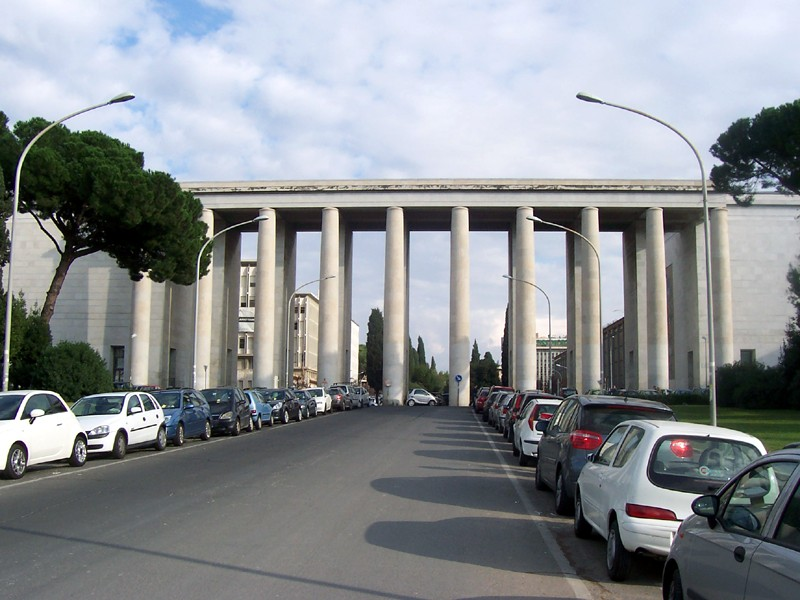
Colonnade connecting the Palace of Sciences and the Palace of Popular Arts and Traditions (2019

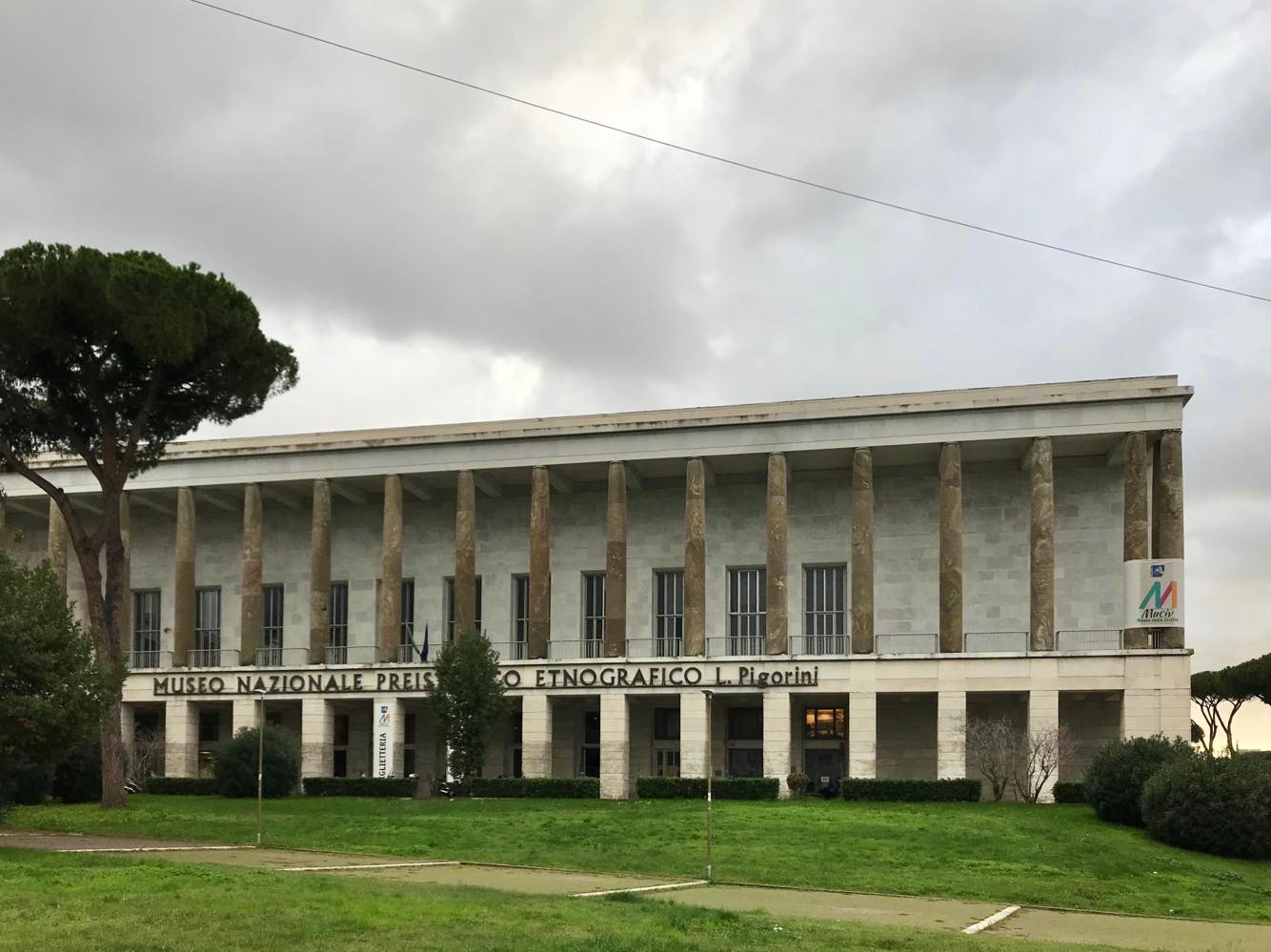
Palace of Sciences (2019)

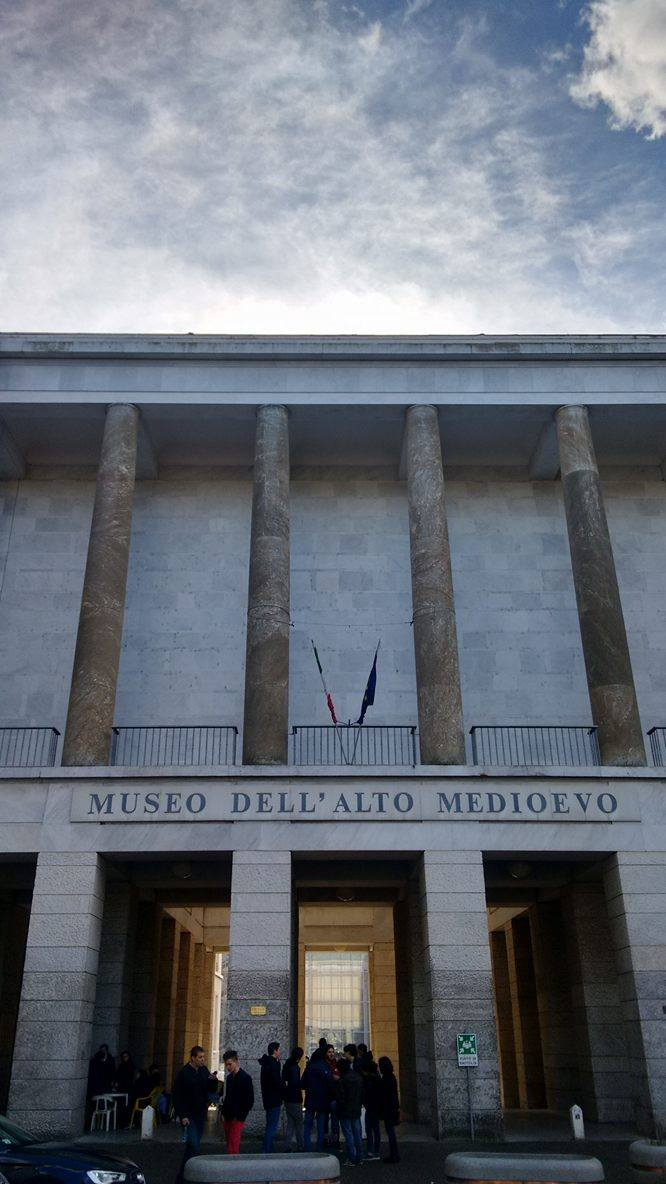
Entrance to the Museum of the Early Middle Ages (2019)

Palace of Popular Arts and Traditions

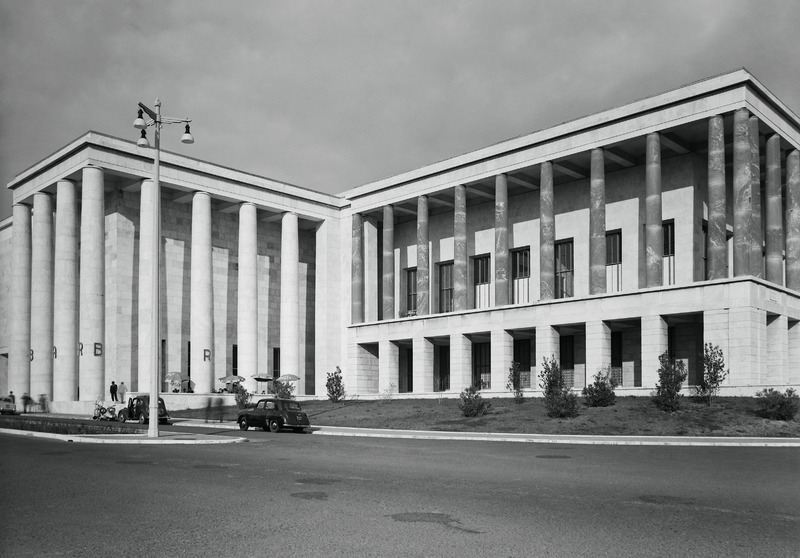
Palace of Popular Arts and Traditions (1950-1960)

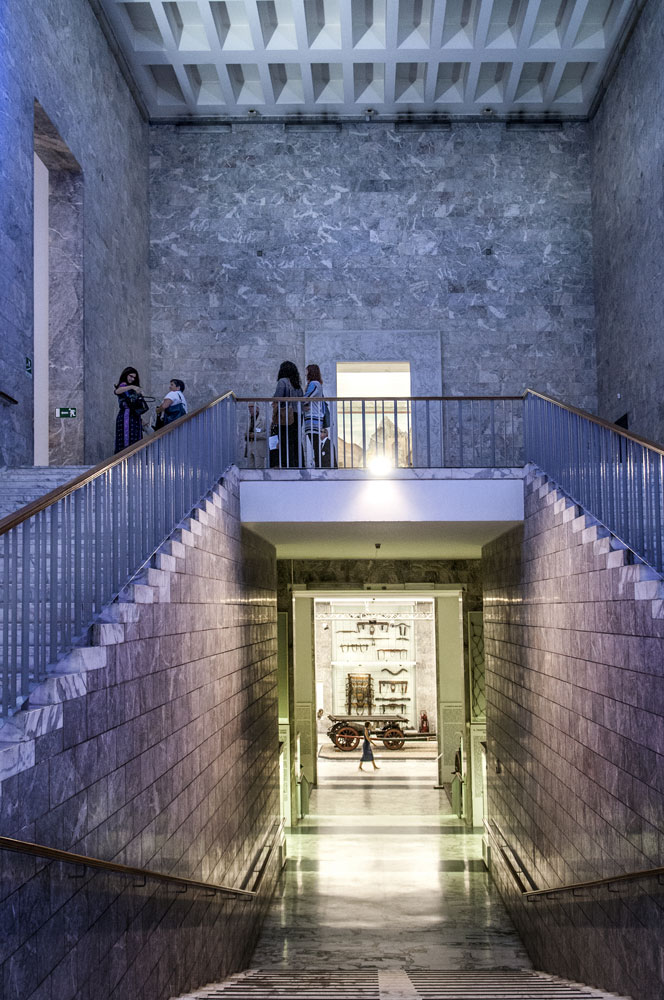
Palace of Popular Arts and Traditions: monumental staircase and entrance to the Hall of Honour (photo by Francesca Montuori)

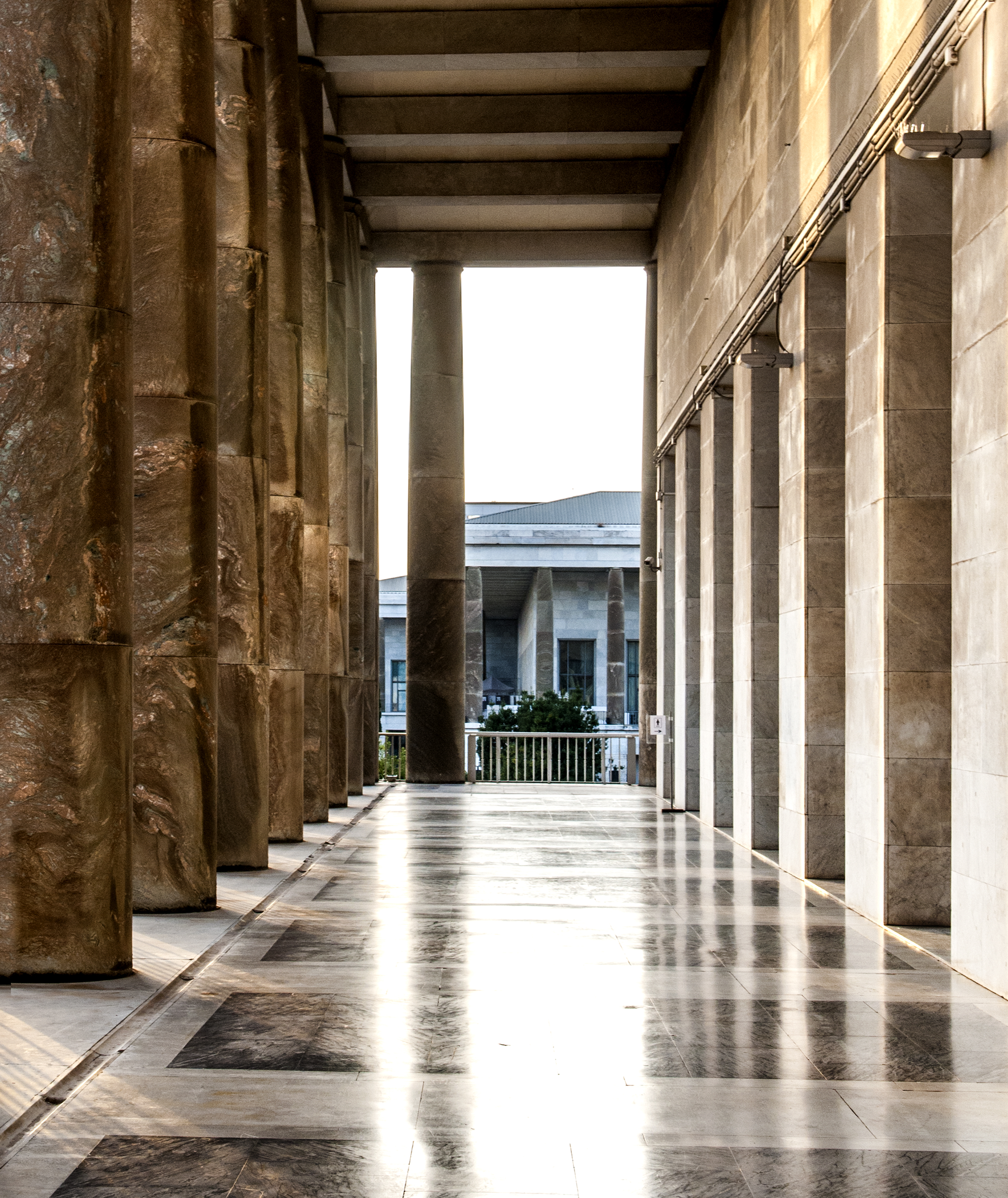
Palace of Popular Arts and Traditions (photo by Corrado Bonora)

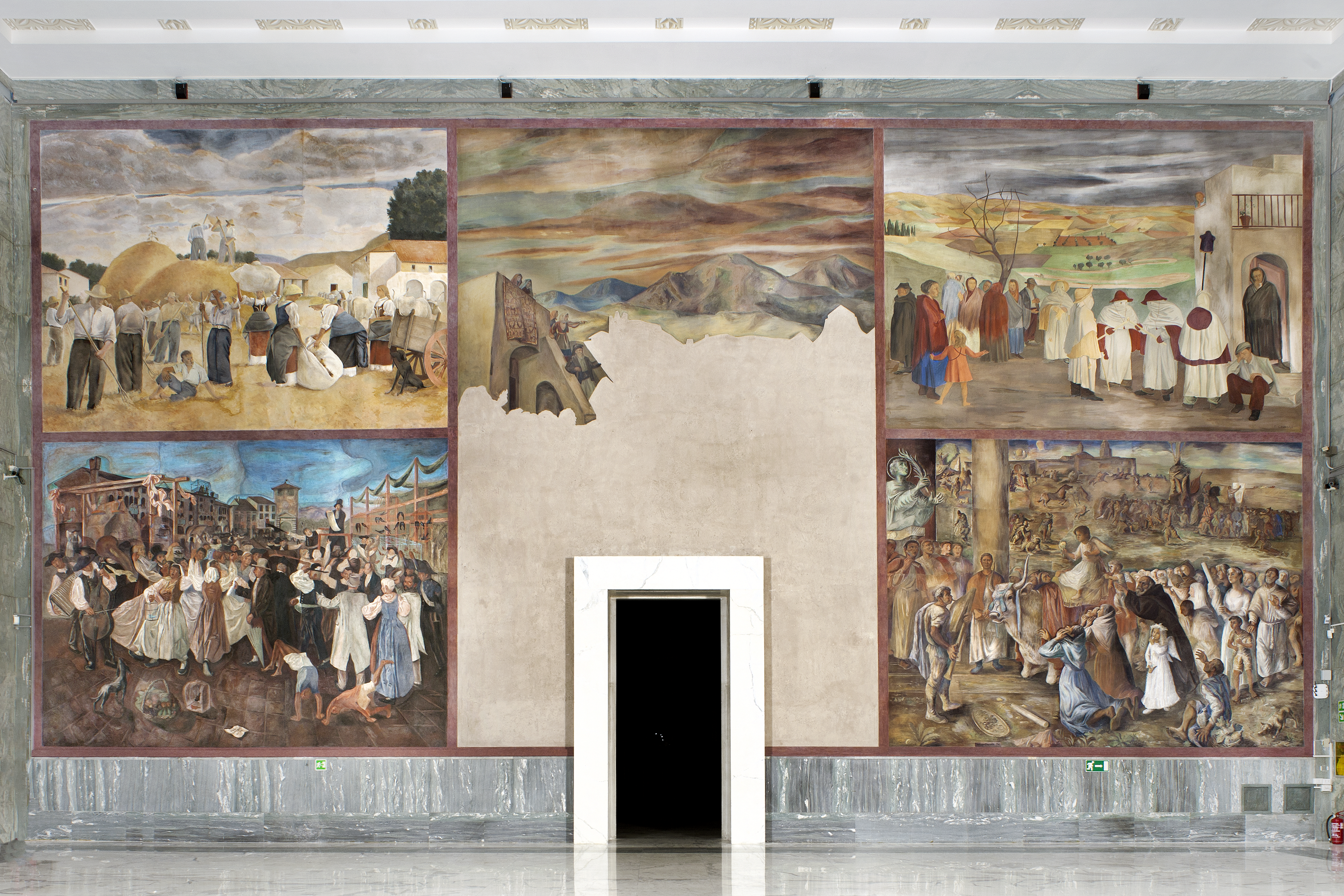
Palace of Popular Arts and Traditions: part of the frescoes in the Hall of Honour (photo by Corrado Bonora)

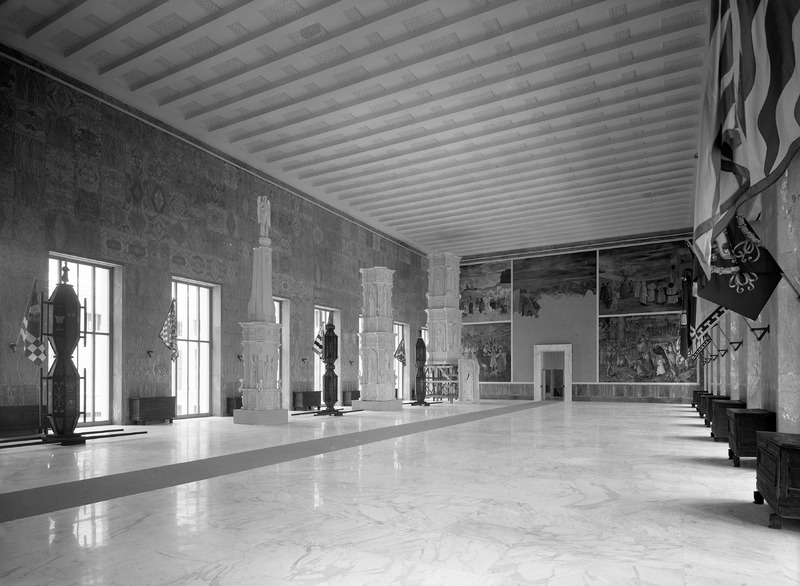
Palace of Popular Arts and Traditions (1956)

Palace of Sciences

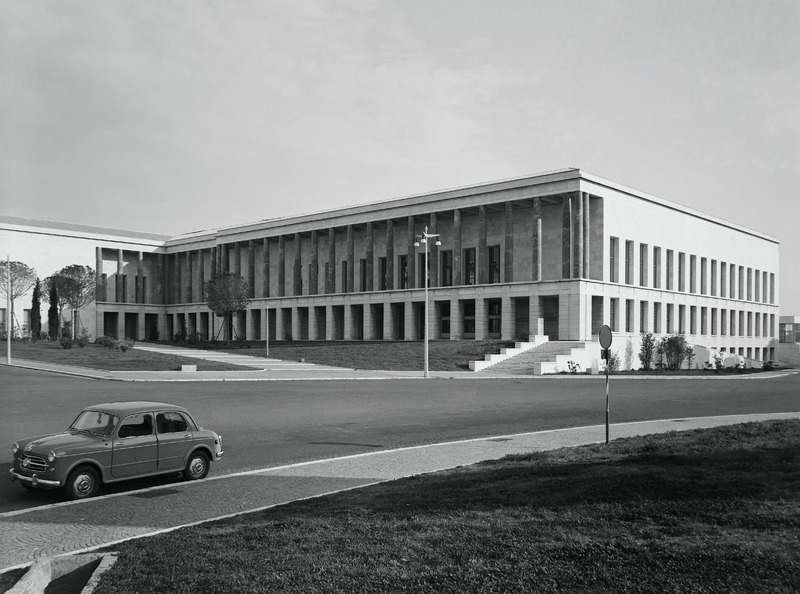
Palace of Sciences (1950-1960)

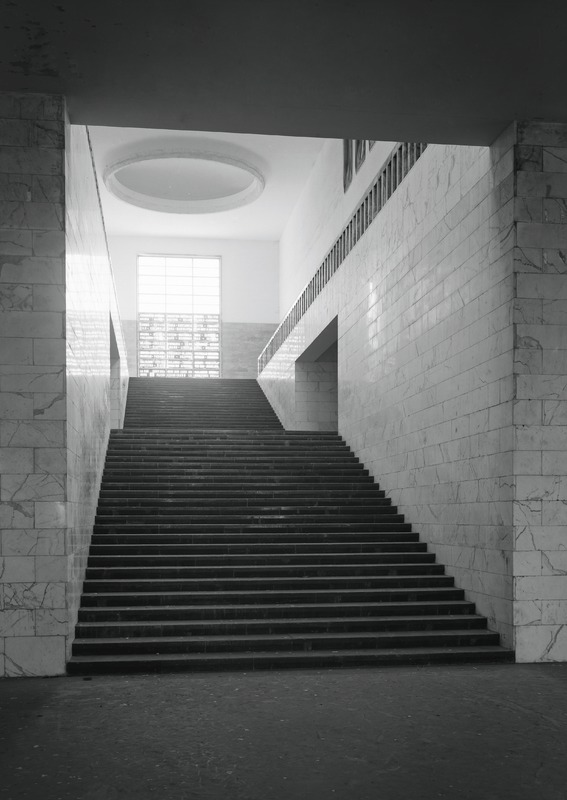
Palace of Sciences: monumental staircase at the entrance (1950-1960)

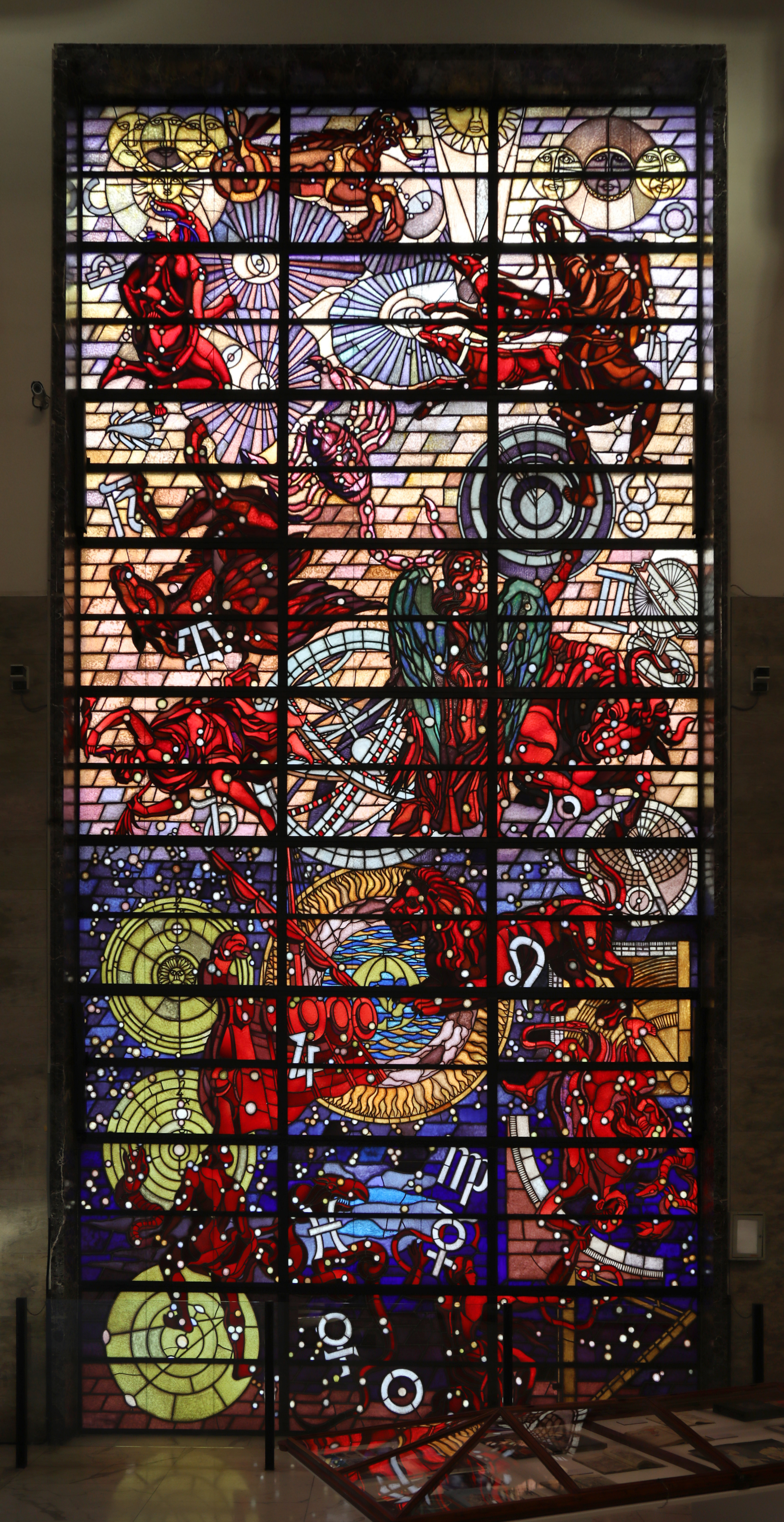
Palace of Sciences: polychrome stained glass window by Giulio Rosso

== See also ==
- EUR, Rome
- List of museums in Rome
- National Museum of Oriental Art
- Pigorini National Museum of Prehistory and Ethnography
