= Pigorini National Museum of Prehistory and Ethnography =

- Museo nazionale preistorico etnografico Luigi Pigorini
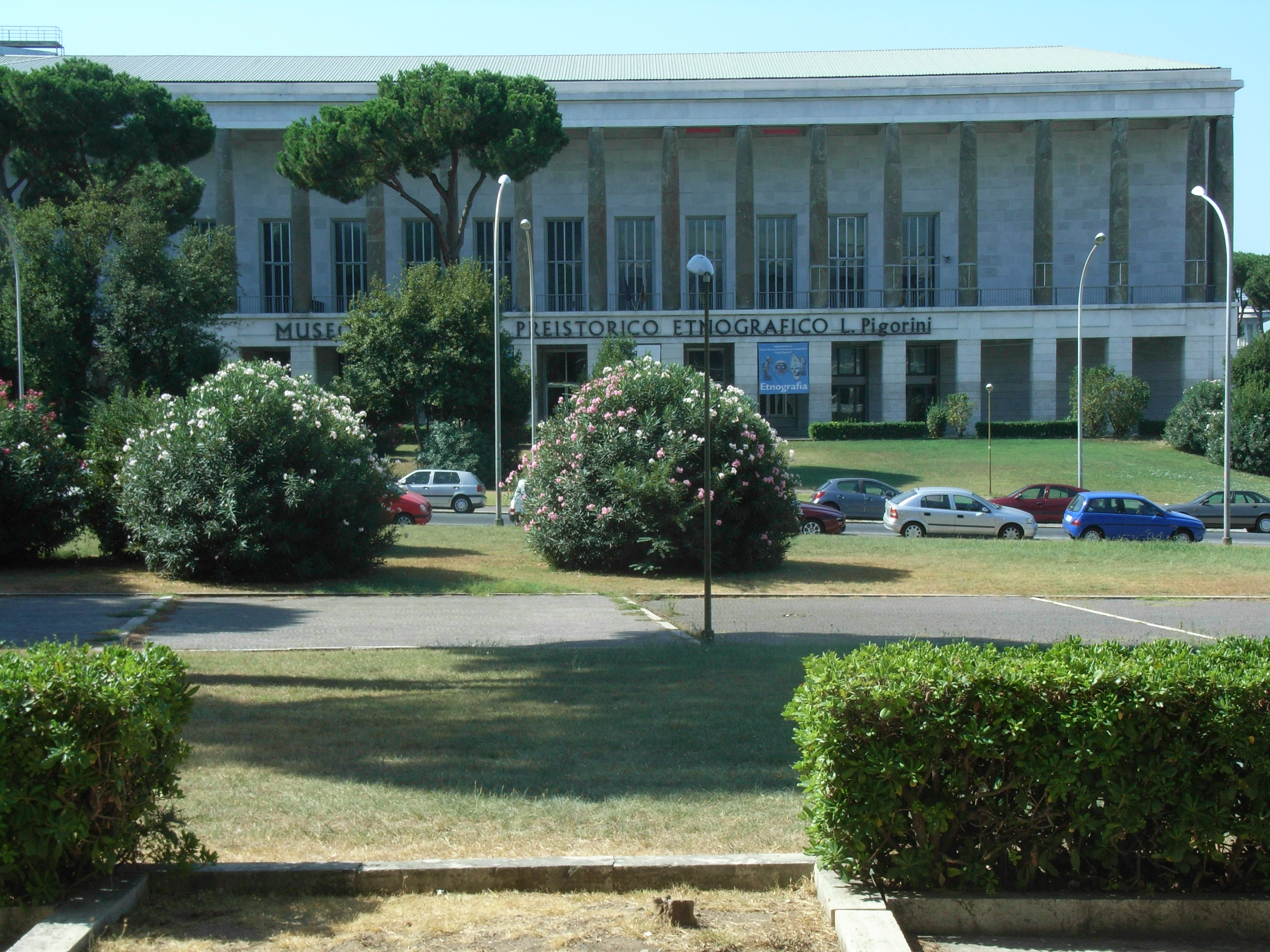
- The museum building photographed from the facing Museo Nazionale delle Arti e Tradizioni Popolari.
- Click on the map for a fullscreen view
- Established: 1876
- Location: Piazza Guglielmo Marconi 14, I-00144 Rome, Italy
- Coordinates: 41°49′56″N 12°28′17″E
- Type: Archaeology, Art museum
- Website: www.museodellecivilta.it/preistoria-etnografia/

The "Luigi Pigorini" National Museum of Prehistory and Ethnography was a public and research museum located in Rome, Italy. Established in 1875 and opened in 1876 by Luigi Pigorini, from 2016, its collections became part of the newly instituted Museo delle Civiltà, currently directed by Andrea Viliani. The museum was housed in the Collegio Romano from 1875 to 1923.

== Holdings ==
By the time of Pigorini's death in 1925, the museum had amassed more than 170,000 items.

These included Neolithic artifacts from Lake Bracciano, the early ethnographic collection of Athanasius Kircher, and the Praeneste fibula, the oldest known inscription in the Latin language. It also houses the Upper Paleolithic Venus of Savignano.

Preceded by Palazzo delle Esposizioni	Landmarks of Rome; Pigorini National Museum of Prehistory and Ethnography	Succeeded by Porta San Paolo Railway Museum
