= Venus of Savignano =

Prehistoric figurine discovered in Italy

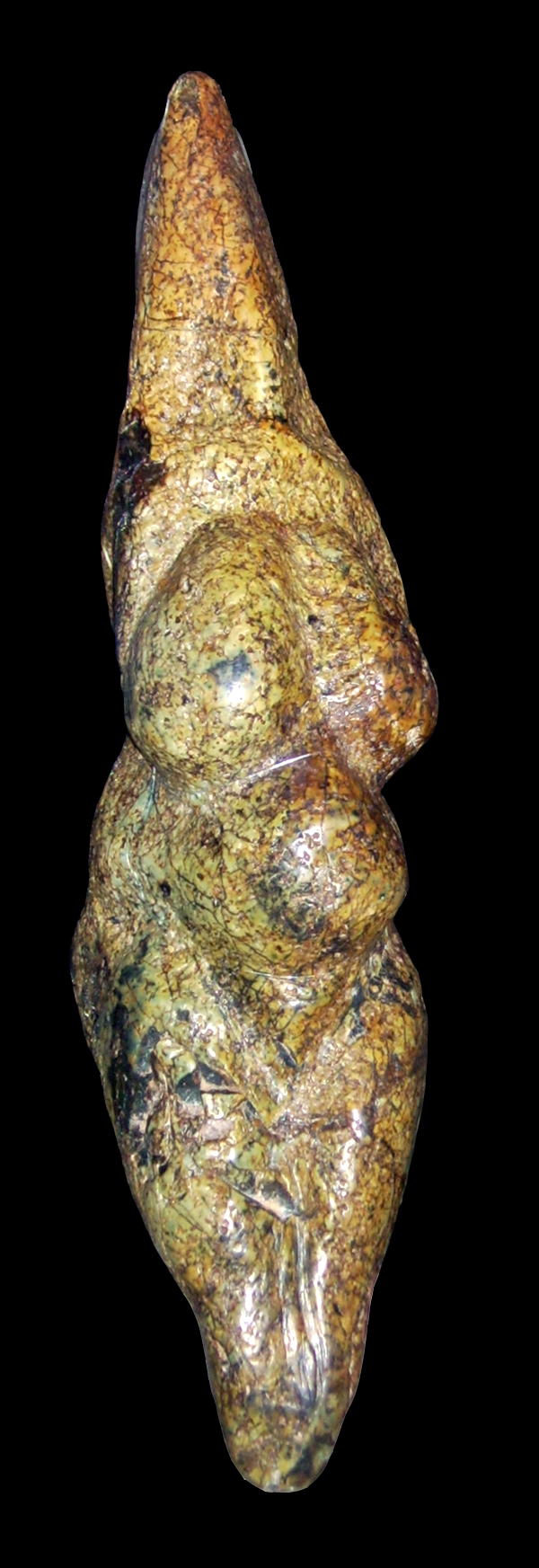
- Venus of Savignano, three–quarter view
- Material: Greenstone (serpentine)
- Height: 22.5 cm
- Width: 4.8 cm
- Created: c. 23,000 years ago
- Discovered: 1925; Emilia-Romagna, Italy
- Discovered by: Olindo Zambelli
- Present location: Pigorini National Museum of Prehistory and Ethnography, Rome, Italy

The Venus of Savignano is a Venus figurine made from soft greenstone (serpentine) dating back to the Upper Paleolithic, which was discovered in 1925 near Savignano sul Panaro in the Province of Modena, Italy.

With 22.5 cm (8.9 in) in height, 4.8 cm (1.9 in) in width and 5.2 cm (2.0 in) in depth, and with a weight of 586.5 g (20.69 oz), it is one of the largest known Venuses among the around 190 dated to the Upper Paleolithic in Europe and Siberia. With a proposed dating of 25,000–20,000 years ago, it is considered one of the earliest expressions of art in Italy.

== History ==
The statuette was unearthed in 1925 by a farmer, Olindo Zambelli, who was digging outside his stable in the locality of Prà Martino, under the frazione of Mulino, itself within the comune of Savignano sul Panaro. He found the statuette under c. 1 m (3.3 ft) of Late Pleistocene fluvial deposits. Zambelli cleaned and kept the “old stone” despite his wife's advice to throw it away; eventually, he showed it to a local painter and sculptor, Giuseppe Graziosi, who realized the importance of the find and managed to obtain it from the farmer in exchange for two hundred kilograms of grapes.

The new owner then showed the figurine to his son Paolo Graziosi, at the time a young student of archaeology, who published a paper on it. In 1926, Giuseppe Graziosi donated the figurine to the Pigorini National Museum of Prehistory and Ethnography in Rome, which stills holds the figurine today. A replica is housed in the Museo della Venere e dell'Elefante at Savignano sul Panaro. (Note: Literally, "Museum of the Venus and the Elephant", where the elephant refers to the other major find near Savignano that is also housed there, a fossil female specimen of Mammuthus meridionalis dating to 1.5 Ma.) The original figurine was temporarily loaned to Savignano from 5 April to 4 May 2014 for exhibition within the project "Savignano, Città dell'Archeologia". The exhibition recorded 3,215 visitors, although the museum was only open in the mornings during the weekdays.

== Style ==
The figurine is roughly biconical. Typical of other venus figures, the feminine features are overemphasized: the thighs and hips are large while the belly, breasts and buttocks are protruding. The head is a cone, the arms are barely sketched, and there are no hands, feet, or shoulders at all. The back is concave. In some points a few traces of red ochre paint are still visible.

== Dating ==
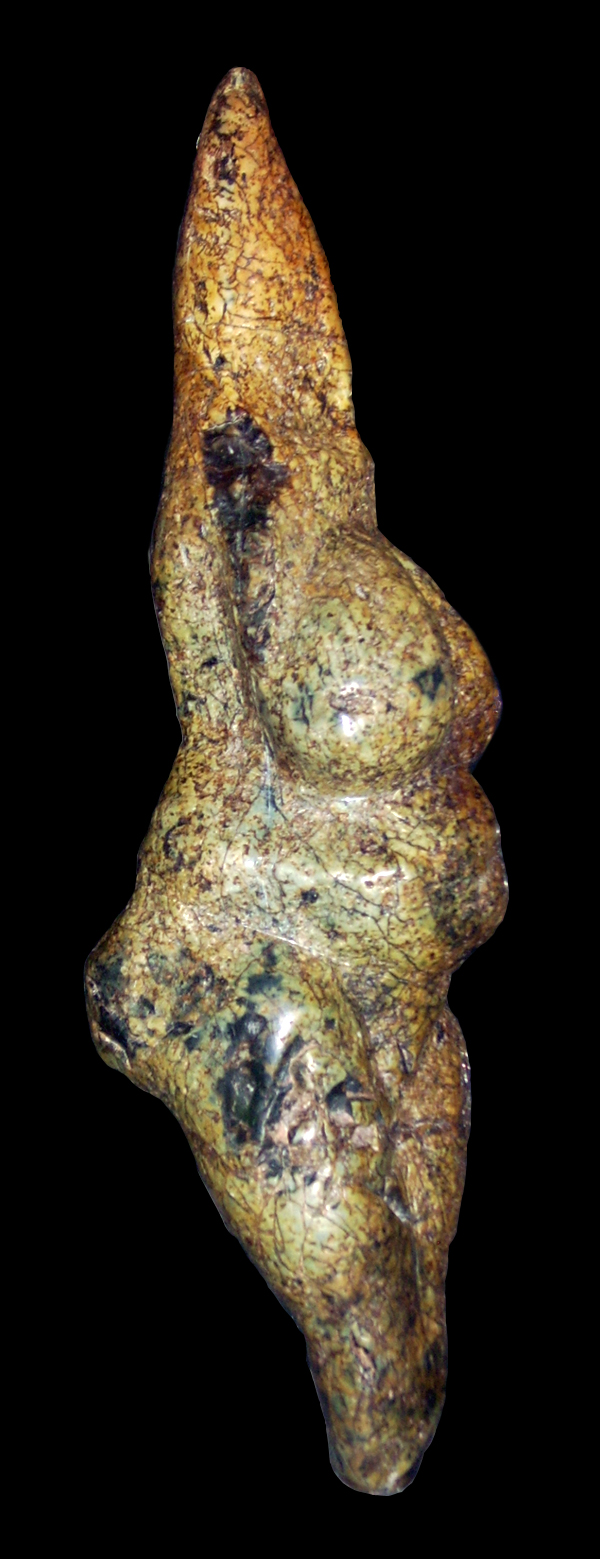
Side view

The figurine was cleaned after the discovery, thus all organic traces which could have been dated with conventional methods were destroyed. For this reason, any dating was controversial since the beginning and can only be done by comparisons with other figurines. Thanks to these comparisons, it is now generally assumed that the Venus of Savignano belongs to the Gravettian culture and that it can be roughly dated back to 25,000–20,000 BP, although some sources tend to lean toward an earlier dating, up to c. 28,000 BP, and some sources favor a much later dating.

In his first study in 1925, Paolo Graziosi attributed the figurine to the Upper Paleolithic. His conclusion was in contrast with the mainstream opinion at the time, when most Italian academics did not recognize an Italian Upper Paleolithic, rather opting for a direct transition between the late Mousterian and the Neolithic periods. Indeed, a group of archaeologists led by Ugo Antonielli, the Director of the Pigorini Museum, compared the figurine with others Venuses dated to the Neolithic, concluding that the Venus of Savignano must have been dated to the Neolithic too.

However, a subsequent analysis by other scholars in 1935 concluded that the figurine was "surely paleolithic". Later, Paolo Graziosi made a stylistic comparison between the Venus of Savignano and other figurines such as the Venus of Trasimeno, the figurines from Balzi Rossi in Ventimiglia and the recently discovered (1940) Venus of Chiozza di Scandiano in Reggio Emilia; due to that, he again confirmed the Upper Paleolithic age of the figurine in his cross-presentation to Paleolithic art in 1956.

== See also ==
- List of Stone Age art

== Literature ==
- La Venere a Savignano. Esposizione dal 5 Aprile al 4 Maggio 2014, Museo della Venere e dell'Elefante, Savignano 2014 (exhibition catalog).
- Margherita Mussi, "Problèmes récentes et découvertes anciennes: la statuette de Savignano (Modène, Italie)", Bulletin de la Société Préhistorique de l'Ariège 51 (1996), 55–79.
- Margherita Mussi, "Les statuettes italiennes de pierre tendre de Savignano et Grimaldi", in: Henri Delporte (ed.), «La Dame de Brassempouy», Actes du colloque de Brassempouy (juillet 1994), Lüttich 1995, pp. 165–185.
- Raymond Vaufrey, "La statuette féminine de Savignano sur le Panaro (Province de Modène)", L'Anthropologie 36 (1926), 429–435.
