= Cabella =

Cabella may refer to:

- Cabella Ligure, a comune in the Province of Alessandria in the Italian region Piedmont
- Cabella (surname), surname

== See also ==
- Cabello, a genus of spiders
