= Malaspina family =

Italian noble family

House of Malaspina Cybo-Malaspina (since 1553)
- Marcher noble family
- Flowered thorns of the Malaspina's main branch
- Parent family: Obertenghi
- Country: (Holy Roman Empire) Kingdom of Italy (HRE); Republic of Genoa; Duchy of Massa and Carrara; Kingdom of Sardinia
- Etymology: Alberto Obertenghi's nickname "Malaspina" ("bad thorn")
- Founded: 12th century
- Founder: Alberto "Malaspina" Obertenghi
- Current head: Beatriz Malaspina Wagner.
- Final ruler: Maria Theresa, Duchess of Massa
- Titles: Duke/Duchess of Massa 1529–1790); Prince/Princess of Carrara 1529–1790); Lord of Massa and Carrara 1492–1529); Marquis of Fosdinovo 1355–1797); Marquis Malaspina 12th century – 1790)
- Connected families: Este; Pallavicini; Cybo
- Motto: Sum Mala Spina Malis. Sum Bona Spina Bonis ("A bad thorn for the bad. A good thorn for the good.")
- Estates: Malaspina Castle (seat, Massa); Palazzo Cybo-Malaspina (seat, Carrara); Castle of Serravalle (Sardinian stronghold)
- Dissolution: 1790
- Cadet branches: Malaspina "of the Dry Thorn" (still existing) (Note: Although all branches of families died out before its main branch (Cybo-Malaspina), some descendants are still present in Greece and Americas.)

The House of Malaspina was a noble Italian family of Longobard origin that descended from Boniface I, through the Obertenghi line, that ruled Lunigiana from the 13th to the 14th centuries, and the marquisate of Massa and lordship of Carrara (which later became the Duchy of Massa and Carrara and at a later time the Principality of Massa and the Marquisate of Carrara) since the 14th century.

== History ==
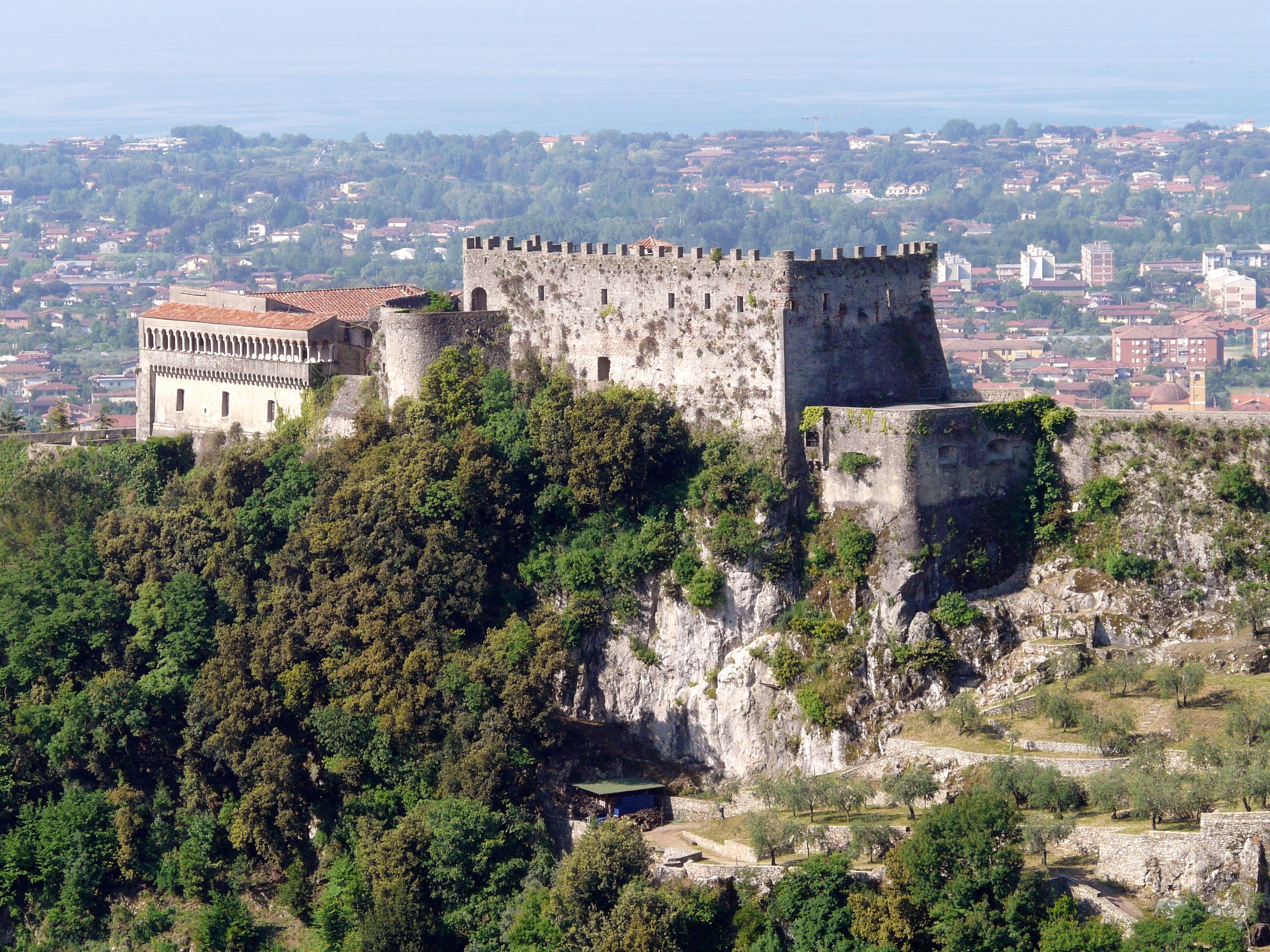
Malaspina Castle (Rocca Malaspina) in Massa

The founder of the Malaspina family was Oberto I, who became the count of Luni in 945. Oberto I was created the marquis of the March of Genoa under the Italian king Berengar II in 951 and he became a count palatine in 953.

Oberto I had two sons; Oberto II, who succeeded his father as count of Luni, and Adalberto I, whose offspring founded the Pallavicino and the Cavalcabò families. Oberto II had four children; Bertha of Milan, the wife of the King of Italy Arduino; Ugo, count of Milan; Albert Azzo I, count of Luni and Margrave of Milan, whose offspring founded the Este family branches of Hanover and Brunswick; and Oberto Obizzo I, progenitor of the lineage of the Malaspinas.

In 1004, Oberto Obizzo I fought beside his brother-in-law King Arduino against the Count Bishops of Luni: this was the first of many conflicts between the family and the governors of the Roman-founded city. Oberto Obizzo I had a son, Albert I. Albert I also had a son, Oberto Obizzo II (d. 1090), the father of Alberto Malaspina (died 1140), who was the first member of the family to be called Malaspina; for this reason he is sometimes considered the true founder of the family.

The surname Malaspina means "bad thorn" or "ill-willed thorn" in Italian; some historians believe the surname originated in the time of Ancus Marcius as some paintings in the halls of castle of Fosdinovo may suggest. Other historians believe the name may have originated from a legend regarding the death of an enemy, King Merovingio Theudebert I. The legend, which is narrated on five sandstone tiles at the entry gate of the Malaspina castle of Godiasco, tells how the king was killed with a thorn. Others believe the name originated from the remarkably bad attitude of Albert Malaspina or some of his relatives held with others.

Albert Malaspina extended the family's possessions towards the Apennine Mountains near Lunigiana, starting a conflict with Genoa and the Bishops of Luni. The 1124 peace treaty of Lucca references the division of goods between the descendants of Oberto Obizzo I, who in time gave birth to several European noble families; Brunswick, Estens, Pallavicino and the marquises of Massa, Sardinia and Corsica, as well as the Malaspinas.

Albert's son, the Marquis Obizzo I Malaspina (died 1185), initially fought against Frederick Barbarossa the Holy Roman Emperor, supporting rioting commoners. After the emperor took control of the conflict, Obizzo changed sides, supporting him in his fight against Milan in 1157. The emperor rewarded Obizzo, granting him the right to rule over the territories of Liguria, Lunigiana, Lombardy and Emilia. In 1176, after escorting Barbarossa to Pavia, Obizzo surprised him by deciding to ally with the Lombard league and attacking the Emperor's armies. Because of Obizzo's betrayal, Frederick Barbarossa was defeated in the battle of Legnano. In the peace treaty of Constance, the emperor forgave Obizzo and re-confirmed Obizzo's right to rule over the land he was given. Both the Battle of Legnano and the Peace of Costanza are represented in paintings conserved in the hall of Fosdinovo castle and were realized by Gaetano Bianchi at the end of the 19th century.

Obizzo I had two sons Obizzo II Malaspina—also known as Obizzone—and Moroello I Malaspina. The descendants of Obizzo II founded the Spino secco ("dried thorn") branch of the family while the descendants of Moroello I founded the Spino Fiorito ("bloomed thorn") branch of the family (1221). Obizzo II had a son called Conrad I Malaspina, who was defined by Dante Alighieri as "the Old or the Ancient" due to his fame and long-living legacy; Conrad I is considered to be the first of the Spino Secco branch. He obtained all of the territories over the right bank of the Magra river and the territories of Villafranca on the left bank of the river. Conrad I Malaspina had four children; Manfredi Malaspina, Moroello of Mulazzo, Frederick of Villafranca, and Albert Malaspina.

Manfredi Malaspina had a son named Moroello "Vapor of Valdimagra", who was a good friend of Dante Alighieri; because of his close friendship with Manfredi and the kindness he was shown during his exile, Alighieri paid homage to the Malaspina family in the "Purgatory" section of his epic poem Divine Comedy. Moroello had a son named Franceschino Malaspina, who took part in the wars between Guelfs and Ghibellines, and is known to have hosted Dante Alighieri several times during his exile in Lunigiana, nominating him as his personal attorney in the difficult peace negotiations with the Bishop of Luni, Antonio Da Camilla. These negotiations resulted in the peace of Castelnuovo in 1306. Frederick of Villafranca (Brother of Conrad Malaspina The Old) had two sons; Obizzino Malaspina and Conrad Malaspina the Young, to whom Dante expressed his gratitude for the Malaspina family in the 8th canto of "Purgatory".

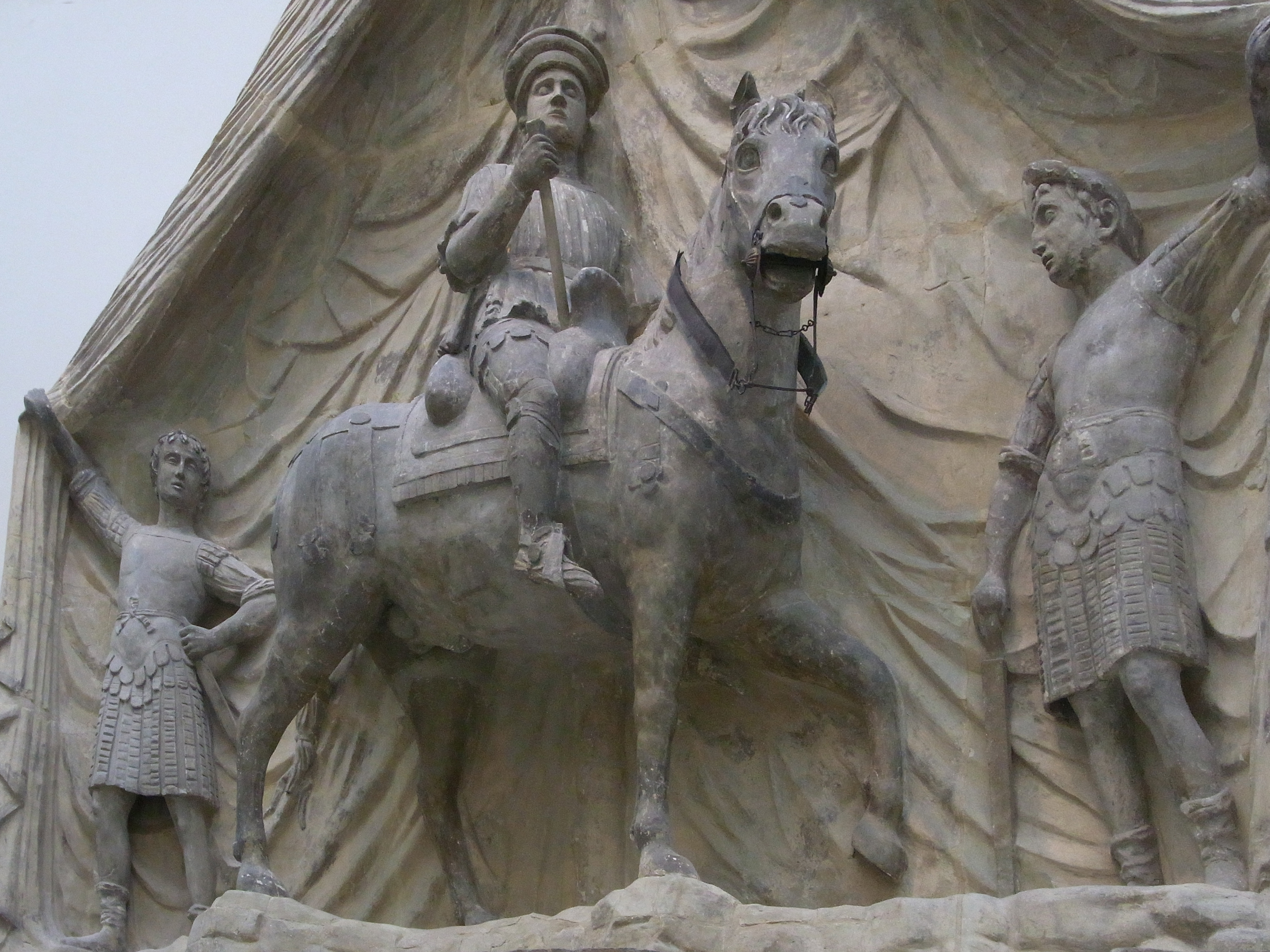
Victoria and Albert Museum – Monument of Marchese Spinetta Malaspina (1430–1435)

Moroello I Malaspina had a son named Guglielmo Malaspina, whose son Obizzino Malaspina is considered to be the true progenitor of the Spino Fiorito branch of the family. He received all of the territories on the left bank of the Magra river. Obizzino married Caterina Cattaneo and had three heirs; Bernabò Malaspina, Isnardo Malaspina, and Albert Malaspina. Isnardo married Cubina d'Este, who gave birth to Gabriele Malaspina (it) and Azzolino Malaspina; the latter had three children; Spinetta Malaspina—also known as "the Great", who in 1340 purchased the feud of Fosdinovo, but had no legitimate offspring; Isnardo; and Azzolino whose offspring would assume the title of Marquess of Fosdinovo (1355).

The division of lands between the ever-increasing heirs brought about a shattering of the Dominion of the family into smaller feuds. The Malaspinas sometimes supported the Ghibelline faction and sometimes the Guelf faction. While supporting the Guelfs, Obizzino took part in the conflicts of the Lombards against the Hohenstaufen. Obizzino, alongside Morroello of the Malaspinas of Giovagallo, commanded the Guelf army that defended Florence against Henry VII of Luxembourg. The Ghibelline faction defending emperor Henry VII was also led by a household member; Spinetta Malaspina, also known as the Great.

The Malaspina family also controlled land in the north of Genoa around the four provinces area in the valleys of the Trebbia and Staffora rivers. The lordships in the Lunigiana and in the north of Genoa (also called Lombarda) were soon fragmented due to the adoption of the Longobard Right, which required an equal division of assets, including feuds, between male sons. Some members of the Malaspina family held a part of the Giudicato of Lugodoro (Giudicato di Torres) in the 13th and 14th centuries but most relevantly from the 15th to the 18th centuries, the branch of the Cybo-Malaspina governed the independent marquisate of Massa and the lordship of Carrara, then known as the Duchy of Massa and Carrara). The family's Sardinian possessions were: the castle of Serravalle (Bosa) with the curation of Planargia and Costa De Addess; and the castle of Osilo with the curation of Montes, Figulinas and Coros. Members of the family also had the right to the title of princes of San Colombano.

== Dante's homage ==
In the eighth canto of Purgatory, Dante Alighieri celebrates the Malaspinas' courtly values, especially those of liberality and hospitality that were well known throughout Europe.

"Oh!" said I then to him, "I 've never been
in your domains, but where throughout all Europe
dwelleth a man who knows them not? The fame
which honoreth your house, proclaims its lords,
proclaims its district, so that even he
knows of them, who hath never been there yet.
I swear to you, so may I go on high,
that of the glorious use of purse and sword
your honored race doth not despoil itself.
(Divine Comedy, Purgatory, Dante Alighieri, 8th Canto, Vv. 121–129)

(Note: Original version: La fama che la vostra casa onora, "Oh!", diss'io lui, "per li vostri paesi già mai non fui; ma dove si dimora per tutta Europa ch'ei non sien palesi? grida i segnori e grida la contrada, sì che ne sa chi non vi fu ancora; e io vi giuro, s'io di sopra vada, che vostra gente onrata non si sfregia del pregio de la borsa e de la spada. (Divina Commedia, Purgatorio, Dante Alighieri, Canto 8, Vv. 121–129))

== Origins ==
The Malaspinas were a marchesal branch descending from the Obertenghi family, whose originator was Oberto I (Otbert or Odebertus), who around the middle of the 10th century became count palatine (the count of the sacred palace of Pavia and absolute judiciary authority of the kingdom), and from 951 he also became marquis of Milan and Count of Luni, as well as of the marquisate of Obertenga, as he called it), in the western part of Liguria, which was made up of the committees of Milan, Genoa, Tortona, Bobbio, Luni and other bordering territories.

This vast territory was fragmented both because the hereditary divisions such as the majorat were not yet valid and because of conflicting relationships with other families, including the Fieschi, Spinola, Doria and others, and because of pressure coming from the birthing communes of Milan, Genoa, Piacenza, Tortona, Pavia and Bobbio. Oberto I founded the house through his descendants Oberto II, Oberto Obizzo I, Albert I, Oberto Obizzo II and Albert I Malaspina (d. 1140).

In 1164, Albert's son Obizzo I (the great) (d. 1185) had his feudal rights confirmed by Emperor Frederick I and was also nominated Imperial Vassal. His feuds included parts of the modern-day Liguria (Tigullio, Cinque Terre and Levanto sul mare—which he acquired from Genoa and the Fieschi; the territories of the Lunigiana, Garfagnana and the valleys of the Trebbia River up to Torriglia); the Val d'Aveto (until Santo Stefano d'Aveto) and Staffora located in the Oltrepò); as well as Lombardy (Val Bormida and Oltregiogo).

In 1220, of Obizzo I's many heirs, only Conrad Malaspina the Old and Obizzino Malaspina were alive; their feudal rights were re-confirmed by the emperor although the territories were slightly reduced due to Piacenza's prevalent influence. In 1221, Conrad and Obizzino divided their lordships equally. Conrad ruled over the Lunigiana territories located on the west bank of the Magra River and Val Trebbia in Lombardy, giving birth to the Spino Secco branch, while Obizzino ruled over the Lunigiana territories located on the east bank of the Magra River and Valle Staffora in Lombardy, giving birth to the Spino Fiorito branch of the family.

=== Essential genealogy ===
- Oberto I
  - Oberto II
    - Oberto Obizzo I
      - Albert I
        - Obizzo II
          - Albert "The Malaspina", forefather of the Malaspina
            - Obizzo Malaspina
              - Obizzone
                - Conrad I Malaspina, forefather of the Spino Secco branch of the family
              - Morello
                - Guglielmo
                  - Opizzo Malaspina, Forefather of the Spino Fiorito branch of the family

== Spino Secco branch ==
The original canting coat of arms of the Malaspina of the Spino Secco was "truncated in gold and red, with a dried thorn crossing it." Blazon: Parti per fess Or and Gules, a blackthorn (Prunus spinosa) erect branched Sable. These later canting arms are blazoned: Gules a lion rampant crowned Or, displaying a blackthorn (Prunus spinosa) branched Sable.

In 1266, four sub-branches were formed from the descendants of Conrad Malaspina (The Old) remembered by Dante Alighieri in the Divine Comedy.

=== Malaspina of Mulazzo ===
The origin of this sub-branch is attributed to Moroello Malaspina (d. 1284), who possessed the Castle of Mulazzo in Lunigiana—the main castle of the Spino Secco branch—and feuds in Val Trebbia surrounding Ottone, He also had some influence over the family's dominions in Sardinia. This sub-branch was the first to be generated from the Spino Secco; it retained possession of the marquisate of Mulazzo until the abolition of feudalism. The branch was extinguished in 1810 with the death of marquis Alessandro Malaspina, a renowned politician, explorer and navigator.

The marquisate, ruling from 1266 to 1797, was recognized as an imperial feud as soon as 1164; it expanded with several acquisitions of land in Pozzo, Montereggio, Montarese, Castagnetoli (from 1746), Calice, Veppo and Madrignano; the latter three territories were administered by the cadets of the Mulazzo sub-branch from 1710 to 1772, and due to debts were sold to the Grand Duke of Tuscany.

In the 16th century, the branches of Madrignano (1523–1634) and Montereggio (1523–1646) momentarily detached from the main Mulazzo branch. The feud of Mulazzo, starting from 1473, was alternately governed by the "Malaspina del Castello" and the "Malaspina del Palazzo" until 1776. The direct male bloodline was extinguished by the famous explorer Alessandro Malaspina. The ruling marquises are presented below. The main sub-branches deriving from the Malaspinas of Mulazzo were:

- Malaspina of Cariseto and Godano, from Cariseto a fraction of Cerignale in Val Trebbia; their forefather was Antonio (d. 1477), son of Antonio of Mulazzo. This branch was extinguished in the span of two generations: the marquisate of Cariseto was acquired by the Fieschi in 1540 and subsequently by the Doria.
- Malaspina of Santo Stefano, from Santo Stefano d'Aveto, in Val Trebbia; their forefather was Ghisello I (d. 1475), son of Antonio of Mulazzo. In 1495 the marquisate of Santo Stefano was sold to the Fieschi, only retaining the feuds of Godano and Bolano, both located in val di Vara between Lunigiana and Val Trebbia. The branch was extinguished in the 17th century and their feuds were left to the main branch of Mulazzo.
- Malaspina of Edifizi, in Edifizi a fraction of Ferriere in val Nure, their forefather was Pietro, son of Ghisello I of Santo Stefano, the branch was extinguished in 1624.
- Malaspina of Casanova (from a Casanova probably near Ottone); their forefather was Antonio, a bastard son of Barnabò of Mulazzo. The branch was extinguished in the 18th century after having sold their feud to the Doria in the 16th century.
- Malaspina of Croce (from Croce Fieschi in the Ligurian Apennines).Their feud was sold to the Fieschi in 1504.
- Malaspina of Fabbrica, from Fabbrica a fraction of Ottone (not to be mistaken with Fabbrica Curone of which the Malaspina of Varzi was the marquis). Their forefather was Moroello, who was either the son of Bernabò or of Galeazzo of Mulazzo. They sold their feud in 1540 to the Fieschi and survived to the end of the feudalism. The branch is still living today.
- Malaspina of Ottone, from Ottone in Val Trebbia. Their forefather was Giovanni, who was either the son of Bernabò or of Galeazzo of Mulazzo. They sold their feud in 1540 to the Fieschie and the branch was extinguished at the beginning of the 19th century.
  - Malaspina of Orezzoli, from Orezzoli, a fraction of Ottone. Their forefather was Galeazzo, son of Giovanni of Ottone. They had a considerable ramification process; their main branch was extinguished in the 18th century but the bloodline survived in some sub-branches. From one of these sub-branches, native to Bobbio, derived via adoption the branch of the Malaspina-Della Chiesa, marquises of Volpedo and of Carbonara.
  - Malaspina of Frassi, from Frassia fraction of Ottone. Their forefather was Giovanni, son of Galeazzo of Orezzoli. The bloodline still exists today through many sub-branches. They sold their feud in 1656 to the Doria.
- Malaspina of Madrignano, an independent branch that started in 1355 with Azzone as its forefather. The branch was extinguished until 1631 but was later revived from 1710 to 1772 with the Consignori of Mulazzo. The ruling marquises are presented below.

=== Malaspina of Castevoli ===
An autonomous branch of the family starting from the 15th century with Azzone of Antonio of Mulazzo as its forefather. This branch possessed the feuds of Stadomelli, Cavanella and had some ruling authority over Villafranca. Its main representatives were Thomas II (d. 1603) and his son Francesco (d. 1649). The main branch went extinct in 1759 and with imperial approval, the feuds were unified with Villafranca (1796). In 1794, some revolts against the authoritarian regime of Thomas III started. In 1757, part of the feud was acquired by the Mulazzo branch. The ruling marquises are presented below.

=== Malaspina of Giovagallo ===
The forefather of this branch was Manfredo, son of Conrad Malaspina The Old, around 1260. They possessed the castle of Giovagallo (Tresana) and some surrounding land. The branch went extinct in 1365 and their feuds were inherited by the Villafranca branch. Most of the marquisate was absorbed by the marquisate of Tresana.

=== Malaspina of Villafranca ===
Their forefather was Frederick, son of Conrad Malaspina The Old; they ruled over the castle of Malnido as well as Villafranca in Lunigiana and the surrounding lands. The branch was greatly weakened and impoverished due to many hereditary divisions, wars and the loss of numerous territories in the valleys close to the river Vara, Auella and Taverone. In the 16th century they were taken under the protection of Modena and thanks to their loyalty, with the May 3, 1726, decree, the duke Rinaldo d'Este of Modena gave them the name "Malaspina Estensi". Their newly formed dominion included Garbugliaga, Beverino, Villa, Rocchetta di Vara, and the castles of Virgoletta and Malnido in Villafranca, where they ruled together with the consignori of the Castevoli branch. The ruling marquises are presented below. The branch expanded efficiently, surviving after the end of feudalism and many co-branches still exist. Some of them had their own rulers as well as a separate identity. These include:

- Malaspina of Cremolino, from Cremolino in Monferrato; their forefather was Thomas I (1361), son of Frederick of Villafranca and of Agnese del Bosco, a blood relative of the Aleramica from which derived all of the family's feuds, including the consignoria over the city of Ovada. The branch went extinct in the 16th century.
- Malaspina of Lusuolo, from Lusuolo a fraction of Mulazzo in Lunigiana. Their forefather was Azzone (died in 1364), son of Opizzino of Villafranca; he inherited the feuds of the Malaspina of Giovagallo that was already extinct. This branch went extinct in the 17th century after selling their feuds to the grand-duke of Tuscany.
  - Malaspina of Podenzana from Podenzana in Lunigiana, whose forefather was Leonardo, son of Gian Spinetta of Lusuolo in 1536. During the Spanish war of succession, Alexander became the imperial governor of Aulla, greatly weakening the powers of the families of Genoa that had the right to rule over those territories since 1543. Refusing to pledge his loyalty to the king of Spain, Alexander's castle was demolished in 1706. In 1710, he regained the right to rule over the territories as the marquis of Aulla, purchasing the feud from the emperor at the price of 30.000 fiorini. In 1794, the branch inherited part of Licciana. They also possessed Montedivalli, Amola and a quarter of the feud of Monti. The branch went extinct in the 18th century. The ruling marquises are presented below.
- Malaspina of Tresana, from Tresana in Lunigiana. Their forefather was Opizzino, son of Giovanni Jacopo of Lusuolo, The branch went extinct with Guglielmo in 1652.
- Malaspina of Licciana, from Licciana Nardi in Lunigiana; their forefather was Gian Spinetta, son of Giovanni Spinetta of Villafranca> They became an independent branch in 1535 and ruled of the feud of Licciana. Their marquisate also had influence over Panicale, Monti, Piancastelli, Solaro, Bigliolo, Catanasco, Mulesano and Amola. Ferdinando, in the attempt to ask for Spanish protection, was killed during a riot in 1611. In 1778 the branch was put under the protection of Modena and in 1783 the family inherited in 1783 a part of the feud of Bastia. The branch went extinct at the end of the 18th century; after the death of Ignazio, the feud was acquired by the Podenzana branch (1795). The ruling marquises are presented below.
  - Malaspina of Bastia, from Bastia, a fraction of Licciana Nardi; their forefather was Fioramonte II, son of Gian Spinetta di Licciana (d. 1528). The line became independent in 1535. During the 17th century, the feud was disgraced by the criminal activities of Nestore, the younger brother of the marquis Carlo; his criminal activity ended only after his death, which was caused by a violent popular revolt. Nestore completely disregarded the intervention of the grand duchy of Tuscany. In 1704 the feud became a Tuscan estate, gaining protection but having to be ruled by Florence officials. The marquee Anna, consort of the marquis Giovanni, was renowned in the territory as a woman of unmatched beauty; she was invited to Versailles in hopes of making her Luigi XV's favourite courtesan, replacing Pompadour. She failed in her efforts and came back to the feud with only a modest sum of money in compensation granted by the king. The line became extinct in 1783, leaving the feud to the line of Ponte Bosio. The ruling marquises are presented below.
    - Malaspina of Terrarossa, from Terrarossa, a fraction of Licciana Nardi; their forefather was Fabrizio, son of Fioramonte of Bastia, who sold his feud to the Grand-Duke of Tuscany in 1617. This branch was extinguished after only two generations.
    - Malaspina of Ponte Bosio, from Pontebosio, a fraction of Licciana Nardi; their forefather was Ludovico I, the abiotic grandson of Fioramonte of Bastia. This branch became the sovereign branch in 1631, receiving the official imperial investiture in 1639. They inherited the feud of Bastia in 1783 and in 1794 part of the feud of Licciana. They survived the end of feudalism but went extinct in the 19th century. The ruling marquises are presented below.
  - Malaspina of Monti from Monti, a fraction of Licciana Nardi; their forefather was Moroello (1535–1575), son of Gian Spinetta of Licciana. This line went extinct in two generations with Orazio (1575–1585).
  - Malaspina of Suvero, from Suvero, a fraction of Rocchetta di Vara, a province of Spezia on the borders of Lunigiana; their forefather was Rinaldo (1535), son of Gian Spinetta II of Licciana. This branch inherited Monti, which was later sold in 1664 to the Podenzana branch of the family The branch survived the end of feudalism and still exists today. An outstanding representative of the branch was Torquato (d. 1594), who favoured philanthropic initiatives and constructed a "monte frumentario" to prevent famines. After the hereditary war between Rinaldo II and Spinetta of the Olivola branch (1627), the imperial feud was at peace until the Spanish invasion of 1733, which destroyed the family's castle. The ruling marquises are presented below.

=== Malaspina of Pregòla ===
This branch's forefather was Alberto (d. 1298), son of Conrad Malaspina (The Old). They inherited the feud of Pregòla—a fraction of Brallo di Pregola—and vast territory on the left side of the Val Trebbia; the river divided their feuds from the ones owned by the branch of Mulazzo. They also owned some territories near Bobbio. In 1304 Corradino Malaspina, the lord of the castle of Carana (Corte Brugnatella), in agreement with Visconte Pallavicino and the abbot of Bobbio, Guido took control over Bobbio, transformed it into a lordship and built its current castle. In 1341 the Visconti Milan took control of Bobbio and of the Brugnatella court, stripping the Malaspina of the castle of Carana and destroying the famous Castello Nero, a black castle famous for the unusual stones used to build it. After 1347, when Corradino died, the feud was distributed between his heirs but in 1361 they had to give it to the Visconti family. in 1436 it was given to the Dal Verme family, who had become counts of Bobbio and Voghera. The Malaspinas also lost control over the ancient church of San Cristoforo in the Valle del Carlone. The only territory they still owned was Dezza, which was later given to the Malaspina of Pregòla. The branch endured a division in 1347, from which the feuds of Prato (a fraction of Cantalupo Ligure, in Val Borbera, near Val Trebbia) and of Corte Brugnatella, which both had a short history. In another division in 1453 the four quartieri were separated from the feud of Pergola; each of the estates was given to a distinct branch of the family. These branches were:

- Malaspina of Vezimo, from Vezimo, a fraction of Zerba in Val Trebbia. They went extinct at the end of the 16th century.
- Malaspina of Pei and Isola from Pei, a fraction of Zerba; and Isola, a currently abandoned town in the fraction of Brallo di Pregola. The main branch went extinct in the 17th century but it is plausible that some descendants of the family survive between the Malaspinas currently living in the area, whose genealogy is still unknown.
- Malaspina of Alpe and Artana from Alpe, a fraction of Gorreto; and Artana, a fraction of Ottone. This line went extinct in the 17th century.
- Malaspina of Pregòla, Campi and Zerba from Zerba and Campi, a fraction of Ottone. They originated the branch, which later re-acquired a majority of the main feud and regained the title of Marques of Pregòla, which are still remembered today during a town celebration called "Sfilata Medioevale in Costume di Bobbio", which is held every November. Thanks to marquis Oliviero, in 1541 they obtained the investiture as an imperial feud and remained so despite continuous threats of invasion by the Savoia until the end of feudalism in Italy (1797). The last marquis ruling the feud was Baldassarre, who had strong pressure coming from the court of Tourin to renounce to his feudal rights. Because of hereditary distress the feud had fostered many family branches as well as the marquises of Pallavicino and Cabella, who with Gerolamo had usurped portions of the Malaspinian feud in 1660. In 1782 Gian Galeazzo Malaspina, the marquis of Santa Margherita; Antonio Giuseppe Malaspina, marquis of Orezzoli; heirs of Conrad Malaspina of Pregòla whose widowed wife Maria Teresa Farnese dal Pozzo in 1777 had become part of the Savoia; as well as Giovan Carlo Spinola Pallavicino, claimed their feudal rights in the court of Vienna regarding the recent annexations by the Savoia, asking for intervention from the Emperor. The direct line survived the end of feudalism and still remains a branch of the family. The line emigrated to Greece and later to the United States.

== Spino Fiorito branch ==
Original coat of arms of the Malaspina of the Spino Fiorito ("truncated in gold and red, with a blooming thorn crossing it.")

in 1275, the son and three grandchildren of the forefather of the branch, Obizzo Malaspina also known as Obizzino, created four other sub-branches of the family.

=== Malaspina of Varzi ===
Their forefather was Azzolino, Obizzino's grandson and son of Isnardo, who had already died before the division in 1275. With his brother Gabriele, Azzolino inherited a third of the estates of his grandfather Obizzino, some of which were in Lunigiana and some in Lombardy. After some time, in agreement with his brother, Azzolino took full control of the Lombardy feuds, mostly located in the Staffora valley surrounding Varzi. The Marquisate of Varzi was divided between Azzolino's three sons; the sub-branch of Isnardo, which ruled over Menconico, went extinct in the 15th century but the other two branches survived:

- Malaspina of Fabbrica, from Fabbrica Curone in a valley that borders with Staffora valley, had Obizzo as their forefather, Azzolino's son. They went extinct at the end of the 19th century after they had become Sforza-Malaspina.
- Malaspina of Varzi (first-born righteous branch); this branch went extinct in the 19th century after having created many ramifications and lost control over the marquisate. It is plausible that there could still be some heirs of the line between the many Malaspinas living in the Staffora valley to this day. From the Varzi branch other two branches were created:
  - Malaspina of Santa Margherita, from Santa Margherita, a fraction of Santa Margherita di Staffora; their forefather was Cristoforo, who died after 1420. They went extinct in 1821.
  - Malaspina of Casanova, from Casanova Staffora, a fraction of Santa Margherita di Staffora. Their forefather was Baldassarre son of Bernabò di Varzi. They generated another sub-branch but went extinct in the 17th century.
    - Malaspina of Bagnaria, from Bagnaria, of which they only had the nominal 'ruling title'. Their forefather was Bernabò son of Bernabò di Varzi. They went extinct in the 17th century.

=== Malaspina of Fivizzano ===
This branch's forefather was Gabriele, Obizzino's grandson and Isnardo's son, who died before the division of the feuds in 1275. Gabriele ruled over a third of the family's estates alongside his brother Azzolino; some feuds were in Lunigiana and some in Lombardy; thanks to a political agreement between him and Azzollino, Gabriele took control of the feuds in Lunigiana, which consisted of the castle of Verrucola in Fivizzano and the bordering territories in eastern Lunigiana. Gabriele had three children; Isnardo's family went extinct in the 15th century, leaving Fivizzano to the Republic of Florence, with which the family were allied. This event determined the future, creating the strong influence Florence had over Lunigiana and the bordering territories. The famous Lunigiana Granducale, which fought for supremacy with the Malaspinian dominium as well as the one of Modena. Spinetta Malaspina pledged his loyalty to Verona; by doing so he was awarded the feud of Fosdinovo. Spinetta had no natural heirs so his bloodline went extinct with his sons; Azzolino's descendants were rewarded with the feud of Fosdinovo and generated the line of Malaspina of Fosdinovo, who were imperial vicars in Italy from whom Antonio Alberico I Malaspina descended. Because Antonio was the marquis of Fosdinovo, he obtained the feud of Massa in 1441. His son, Giacomo I Malaspina (d. 1481), succeeded his father and added to the lordship of Massa the feud of Carrara and its surrounding territories. Giacomo's son, Alberico, banished his brother Francesco and Francesco's offspring, depriving them of all succession rights and leaving his daughter Ricciarda as his sole heir. Ricciarda married Lorenzo Cibo, from which descended the Cybo-Malaspina, the new duchess of Massa and Carrara.

This branch of the family generated several other sub-branches, including:

- Malaspina of Sannazzaro from Sannazzaro de' Burgondi near Pavia; their forefather was Francesco, the son of Giacomo I of Massa, who had been invested as the rightful ruler of the feud by the Sannazzaro in 1466. They went extinct in 1835 with Luigi, an outstanding citizen of Pavia, in which he had a prominent political and social role.

=== Malaspina of Fosdinovo ===
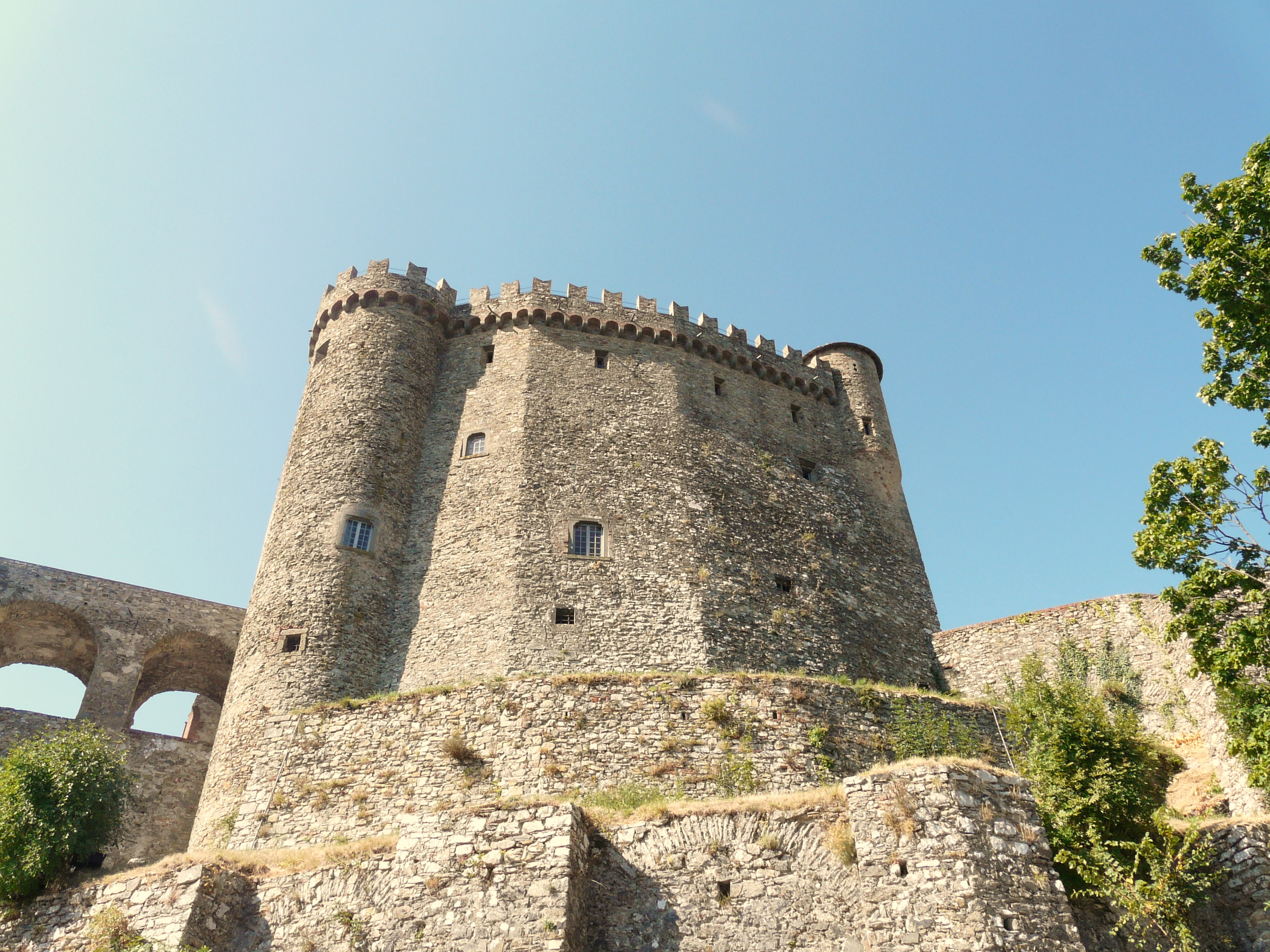
The Malaspinian castle of Fosdinovo

This branch's forefather was the son of Azzolino, Galeotto, who died in 1367. In 1340, Spinetta Malaspina consolidated the family's power over its estates, granting them the lordship for the following centuries. The marquisate of Fosdinovo became sovereignly autonomous in 1367, engulfing the territories of Viano, Castel dell'Aquila, Gragnola (1646), Cortila, Pulica, Giucano, Ponzanello, Tendola, Marciaso and Posterla, Caniparola. Gabriele, son of Antonio Alberico I of Fosdinovo, took control of the feud of Fosdinovo, leaving the other estates to his siblings.

In 1529 the hereditary status of imperial Vicary was recognised to him and his feuds. In 1666 the emperor granted the branch the right to produce its own currency. The last sovereign marquis was Carlo Emanuele, who was in favour of abolishing the imperial feuds in Italy; he agreed with the Napoleonic edict of 2 July 1797 and renounced his feuds. The Torrigiani-Malaspina family still owns the Castle Fosdinovese. The ruling marquises are presented below.

  - Malaspina of Olivola, from Olivola, a fraction of Aulla; their forefather was Lazzaro, son of Giovanni Battista of Fosdinovo and nephew of Gabriele, who had taken control of the feud of Olivola after the assassination of the original heirs of the main branch. The marquisate also possessed Pallerone (1572), Bibola, Bigliolo, Agnino, Quercia, Saracco and Vaccareccia. In 1569 their feud was absorbed by the Grand Duchy of Tuscany. This branch went extinct in the 19th century. The ruling marquises are presented below.
  - Malaspina of Verona; their forefather was Spinetta, son of Antonio Alberico I of Fosdinovo, who gave up his feudal rights but had many estates in Verona. This branch became part of Verona's nobility in 1406 and acquired the marchional title with imperial placet on 13 April 1638, which was then re-confirmed on 7 January 1821. They went extinct in the 20th century.
  - Malaspina of Gragnola, from Gragnola a fraction of Fivizzano; their forefather was Leonardo, brother of Spinetta the Great. They went extinct with Leonardo II (d. 1419) after two generations but their feud was passed down to the marquis of Fosdinovo, which went extinct in 1642. The ruling marquises are presented below.

=== Malaspina of Olivola ===
Their forefather was Francesco, son of Bernabò and grandson of Obizzino who, after the division of 1275, inherited land in Lunigiana (the castle of Olivola, in a fraction of Aulla) and Lombardy, including the castle of Pizzocorno, a fraction of Ponte Nizza. The heirs of the main branch were assassinated in 1413 in the castle of Olivola; their feuds were divided between the Fosdinovo and Godiasco branches of the family. Olivola was given to the line of Gragnola; after the extinction of the line, it was given to Alberico I of Fosdinovo and his son Gabriele IV (d. 1485), who left it to his son Giovan Battista. The feud was later inherited by Lazzaro, who in 1525 created an independent line, which survived until the abolition of the imperial feuds in 1797. The ruling marquises are presented below.

=== Malaspina of Godiasco ===
The forefather of this branch was Alberto, son of Obizzino, who in the division of 1275 with his grandchildren had feuds in both Lunigiana and Lombardy, mainly close to the castle of Filattiera. They were initially called Malaspina of Filattiera; this title was kept by the first generation only. They also had a castle in Oramala—a fraction of Val di Nizza, and later acquired control over the Borgo of Godiasco and set it as their centre of power. In 1743 the province of Bobbio was established under the marquisate of Bobbio from 1516; the Savoia and the mandate of Varzi delimitated their territories. The five main sub-branches of the family were created by Nicolò (also known as Marchesotto) the son of Alberto, and his five children; they all had feuds in Lunigiana and in the marquisate of Godiasco:

- Malaspina of Castiglione and Casalasco from Castiglione del Terziere, a fraction of Bagnone in Lunigiana, and from Casalasco, a fraction of Val di Nizza in the Oltrepò Pavese; their forefather was Franceschino, son of Marchesotto who was also known as The soldier. They went extinct in three generations; the feud of Castiglione went to Florence and that of Casalasco went to the Malaspina of Oramala.
- Malaspina of Bagnone and Valverde from Bagnone in Lunigiana and Valverde in the Oltrepò Pavese; their forefather was Antonio, son of Marchesotto. Antonio's children divided their estates equally; Bagnone was given to Riccardo and was later sold by his grandchildren to Florence. His bloodline went extinct in 1987. The bloodline of prelate Aragonio Malaspina Bartolelli lives on; its last heir is still alive in the Marca Anconetana. Valverde was given to Antonio, whose bloodline probably continued in the Oltrepò.
- Malaspina of Treschietto and Piumesana from Treschietto, a fraction of Bagnone in Lunigiana; and from Piumesana, a fraction of Godiasco in the Oltrepò Pavese; their forefather was Giovanni, son of Marchesotto. In 1698 they sold Treschietto and their lordship over Piumesana to the Grand-Duke of Tuscany. The consignoria on Godiasco was reduced significantly. They went extinct in the 19th century.
- Malaspina of Filattiera and Cella from Filattiera in Lunigiana and Cella, a fraction of Varzi in the Oltrepò Pavese; their forefather was Obizzino, son of Marchesotto. In 1514 Bernabò, rebelled against the Sforza, and was executed in Voghera. The feud of Cella was confiscated; his son Manfredi sold Filattiera to the Grand-Duke of Tuscany. They went extinct in the 18th century.
- Malaspina of Malgrate and Oramala from Malgrate, a fraction of Villafranca in Lunigiana; and from Oramala, a fraction of Val di Nizza in the Oltrepò Pavese. Their forefather was Bernabò, son of Marchesotto. This is one of the few branches of the family, alongside the one of Fosdinovo, that never diminished its power over time; it acquired almost full control of the marquisates of Godiasco, Pozzol Groppo and Fortunago they also acquired substantial control over many of the other Malaspinian feuds of the Oltrepò. This branch was later called Malaspina of Godiasco-Pozzol Groppo and Fortunago. They went extinct in the 19th century. The ruling marquises are presented below.
  - Malaspina of Sagliano from Sagliano Crenna, a fraction of Varzi; their forefather was Azzo, son of Nicolò of Oramala and Malgrate. This branch went extinct in the 18th century.

== Rulers ==
=== House of Malaspina ===
==== Table of rulers ====
Ruler	Born	Reign	Ruling part	Consort	Death	Notes
Alberto I Malaspina	c.1100? Son of Oberto Obizzo IV Malaspina	1130 – 1141	Marquisate of Malaspina	Adelisa three children Picenna no children	1141 aged 40–41	Founder of the family and the marquisate.
Obizzo I the Great	c.1120? Son of Alberto I and Adelisa	1141 – 1186	Marquisate of Malaspina	Maria Bianco da Vezzano three children	1186 aged 65–66	
Moroello I	1140; First son of Obizzo I and Maria da Vezzano	1186 – 1199	Marquisate of Malaspina	(Giordana?) Frangipan four children	1199 aged 58–59	Sons of Obizzo I, ruled jointly, until the death of Alberto in 1212. The surviving nephews, then divided the marquisate between the two: Alberto's brother Obizzo's line became known as Spino Secco (Dried Thorn) and Moroello's as Spino Fiorito (Blossomed Thorn).
Obizzo II	c.1150 Son of Obizzo I and Maria da Vezzano	1186 – 1193	Marquisate of Malaspina	Beatrice? of Montferrat two children	1193 aged 22–23	Sons of Obizzo I, ruled jointly, until the death of Alberto in 1212. The surviving nephews, then divided the marquisate between the two: Alberto's brother Obizzo's line became known as Spino Secco (Dried Thorn) and Moroello's as Spino Fiorito (Blossomed Thorn).
Alberto II the Moor	1150; Son of Obizzo I and Maria da Vezzano	1186 – 1212	Marquisate of Malaspina	(Giordana?) of Montferrat one child	1212 aged 61–62	Sons of Obizzo I, ruled jointly, until the death of Alberto in 1212. The surviving nephews, then divided the marquisate between the two: Alberto's brother Obizzo's line became known as Spino Secco (Dried Thorn) and Moroello's as Spino Fiorito (Blossomed Thorn).
Corrado I the Elder	1180; Son of Obizzo II and Beatrice of Montferrat	1212 – 7 July 1254	Marquisate of Malaspina (Spino Secco)	Constance of Sicily Agnesina six children (in total)	7 July 1254 aged 73–74	In 1254 divided his lands between his sons.
Guglielmo I	c.1180 Son of Moroello I and (Giordana?) Frangipan	1212 – May 1219	Marquisate of Malaspina (Spino Fiorito)	Unknown at least one child	May 1219 aged 38–39?	
Obizzo III	c.1200? Son of Guglielmo I	May 1219 – 1249	Marquisate of Malaspina (Spino Fiorito)	Caterina della Volta seven children	1249 aged 48–49?	In 1249 divided his lands between his sons.

=== Malaspina del Spino Secco ===
Partitions of Lunigiana under Malaspina del Spino Secco rule

Marquisate of Malaspina del Spino Secco (Dried Thorn)
Marquisate of Pregola (1254–1777)	Marquisate of Mulazzo (1254–1797)	Marquisate of Giovagallo (1254–1365)
Marquisate of Cremolino (1275–1467)
Marquisate of Villafranca (1254–1796)
Marquisate of Lusuolo (1301–1616)	Marquisate of Tresana (1407–1651)
Marquisate of Groppoli (1473-1577)	Marquisate of Licciana (1469–1796)	Annexed to Montferrat
Marquisate of Podenzana (1528–1797)	Marquisate of Bastia (1528–1783)	Marquisate of Suvero (1528–1797)
Marquisate of Castevoli (1560–1797)
Marquisate of Madrignano (1573–1631)	Marquisate of Ponte Bosio (1574–1797)	Marquisate of Terrarossa (1574–1617)
Sold to Tuscany; Given to Spino Fiorito branch (1628-1787)	Sold to Tuscany
Sold to Tuscany
Sold to Tuscany

Table of rulers

Ruler	Born	Reign	Ruling part	Consort	Death	Notes
Moroello I	1225; First son of Corrado I and Constance of Sicily/Agnesina	7 July 1254 – 1284	Marquisate of Mulazzo	Berlanda Argentina Grimaldi (1230–1281) five children	1284 aged 48–49	Children of Corrado I, divided the marquisate.
Federico I	c.1230 Second son of Corrado I and Constance of Sicily/Agnesina	7 July 1254 – 1275	Marquisate of Villafranca	Agnese del Bosco seven children	1275 aged 44–45	Children of Corrado I, divided the marquisate.
Manfredo I	c.1230 Third son of Corrado I and Constance of Sicily/Agnesina	7 July 1254 – 1285	Marquisate of Giovagallo	Beatrice three children	1285 aged 54–55	Children of Corrado I, divided the marquisate.
Alberto I	c.1230 Fourth son of Corrado I and Constance of Sicily/Agnesina	7 July 1254 – 1296	Marquisate of Pregola	Unknown at least one child	1296 aged 65–66	Children of Corrado I, divided the marquisate.
Obizzo I	c.1250 First son of Federico I and Agnese del Bosco	1275 – 1301	Marquisate of Villafranca	Tobia Spinola eight children	1301 aged 50–51	Children of Federico I, divided the marquisate.
Tommaso I	c.1250 Second son of Federico I and Agnese del Bosco	1275 – 1309	Marquisate of Cremolino	Richilda of Fosdinovo Ughetta eight children (in total)	1309 aged 58–59	Children of Federico I, divided the marquisate.
Francesco	c.1250 Son of Moroello I and Berlenda-Argentina Grimaldi	1284 – 1319	Marquisate of Mulazzo	Unknown five children	1319 aged 68–69	
Moroello I	1268; Son of Manfredo I and Beatrice	1285 – 8 April 1315	Marquisate of Giovagallo	Alagia Fieschi four children	8 April 1315 aged 46–47	
Moroello	1266; Son of Alberto I	1296 – 1310	Marquisate of Pregola	Giovanna de Vagi at least one child	c.1310 aged 43–44	
Regency of Tobia Spinola (1301–1310)						Sons of Obizzo I, marquis of Villafranca, divided their inheritance.
Federico II	c.1290 First son of Obizzo I and Tobia Spinola	1301 – 1367	Marquisate of Villafranca	Elisabetta Malaspina of Fosdinovo two children	1367 aged 76–77	Sons of Obizzo I, marquis of Villafranca, divided their inheritance.
Corrado II	c.1290 Second son of Obizzo I and Tobia Spinola	1301 – 1330	Marquisate of Villafranca	Giovanna of Gallura no children	1330 aged 39–40	Sons of Obizzo I, marquis of Villafranca, divided their inheritance.
Azzone	c.1290 Third son of Obizzo I Malaspina, Marquis of Villafranca and Tobia Spinola	1301 – 1364	Marquisate of Lusuolo	Margherita Malaspina of Oramala five children	1364 aged 73–74	Sons of Obizzo I, marquis of Villafranca, divided their inheritance.
Isnardo I	c.1280 Son of Tommaso I and Richelda of Fosdinovo	1309 – 1348	Marquisate of Cremolino	Eleonora Asinari three children	1348 aged 67–68	
Corrado II the Longsword	c.1290 Son of Moroello and Giovanna de Vagi	1310 – 1347	Marquisate of Pregola	Caterina della Volta at least one child	1347 aged 56–57	
Manfredo II	c.1300 Son of Moroello I and Alagia Fieschi	8 April 1315 – 1345	Marquisate of Giovagallo	Anna Torelli two children	1345 aged 44–45	
Moroello II	c.1300 Son of Francesco	1319 – 1365	Marquisate of Mulazzo	Alagia Malaspina of Giovagallo seven children	1365 aged 64–65	
Moroello II	? Son of Manfredo II and Anna Torelli	1345 – 1365	Marquisate of Giovagallo	Argentina Grimaldi of Genoa one child	1365	Left no surviving children. After his death Giovagallo was annexed to Villafranca.
Giovagallo was annexed to Villafranca
Alberto II	c.1330 Son of Corrado II and Caterina della Volta	1347 – 1385	Marquisate of Pregola	Unknown at least one child	c.1385 aged 54–55	
Antonio	c.1320 First son of Isnardo I and Eleonora Asinari	1348 – 1355	Marquisate of Cremolino	Unknown one child	1355 aged 34–35	Also Podestà of Tortona in 1332.
Tommaso II	c.1320 Second son of Isnardo I and Eleonora Asinari	1355 – 1402	Marquisate of Cremolino	Unknown three children	1402 aged 81–82?	Probably ruled with his son, who predeceased him.
Gian Isnardo	c.1350 Son of Tommaso II	1355 – 1385	Marquisate of Cremolino	Unknown five children	1385 aged 34–35	
Gian Jacopo	c.1330 Son of Azzone and Margherita Malaspina of Oramala	1364 – 1407	Marquisate of Lusuolo	Unknown five children	1407 aged 76–77	
Antonio I	c.1340 Son of Moroello II and Alagia Malaspina of Giovagallo	1365 – 1407	Marquisate of Mulazzo	Sofia Buzzacarini nine children	1407 aged 66–67	After his death he divided his marquisate between his sons.
Spinetta	c.1330 Son of Federico II and Elisabetta Malaspina of Fosdinovo	1367 – 1403	Marquisate of Villafranca	Costanza ten children	1403 aged 72–73	
Riccardo	c.1370 Son of Alberto II	1385 – 1453	Marquisate of Pregola	Unknown at least one child	1453 aged 82–83?	
Tommaso III	c.1370 First son of Gian Isnardo	1402 – 1427	Marquisate of Cremolino	Unknown one child	1427 aged 56–57	His brother Giovanni founded the branch of Marquesses of Cavatore.
Federico III	c.1350 First son of Spinetta and Costanza	1403 – 1406	Marquisate of Villafranca	Unknown three children	1406 aged 55–56	
Gabriele	c.1360 Second son of Spinetta and Costanza	1406 – 1437	Marquisate of Villafranca	Maddalena Malaspina of Lusuolo five children	1437 aged 76–77	
Azzone I	c.1390 First son of Antonio I and Sofia Buzzacarini	1407 – 1473	Marquisate of Mulazzo	Unknown twenty-four children	1473 aged 82–83?	His brothers Antonio II and Ghisello I founded the branches of Cariseto and Santo Stefano, respectively.
Jacopo	c.1380 Son of Gian Jacopo	1407 – 1460	Marquisate of Lusuolo	Unknown five children~	1460 aged 69–70?	Sons of Gian Jacopo, divided their inheritance.
Obizzo	c.1380 Son of Gian Jacopo Malaspina, Marquis of Lusuolo	1407 – 1450	Marquisate of Tresana	Anna three children	1450 aged 59–60	Sons of Gian Jacopo, divided their inheritance.
Isnardo II	c.1400 Son of Tommaso III	1427 – 1467	Marquisate of Cremolino	Costanza no children	1467 aged 66–67	After his death with no descendants, the marquisate was annexed to the Marquisate of Montferrat. The line survived, and died out in 1529.
Annexed to the Marquisate of Montferrat
Gian Spinetta I	c.1400 Son of Spinetta and Costanza	1437 – 1469	Marquisate of Villafranca	Teodora Malaspina of Mulazzo; 1435 five children	1469 aged 68–69	After his death the marquisate was divided between his sons.
Gian Giorgio	c.1430 Son of Obizzo and Anna	1450 – 1502	Marquisate of Tresana	Costanza three children	1502 aged 71–72?	
Corrado III	c.1400 Son of Riccardo	1453 – 1465	Marquisate of Pregola	Diamante Malaspina of Mulazzo three children	c.1465 aged 64–65	
Jacopo Ambrogio	c.1430 Son of Jacopo	1460 – 1506	Marquisate of Lusuolo	Caterina Suardi eight children	1506 aged 75–76	
Azzo I	c.1430 Son of Corrado III and Diamante Malaspina of Mulazzo	1465 – 1470	Marquisate of Pregola	Unknown at least one child	1470 aged 39–40	
Gian Spinetta II	c.1440 First son of Gian Spinetta I and Teodora Malaspina of Mulazzo	1469 – 1528	Marquisate of Licciana	Maddalena Malaspina of Gragnola five children	1528 aged 87–88?	Children of Gian Spinetta I, divided the marquisate.
Tommaso I	c.1440 Second son of Gian Spinetta I and Teodora Malaspina of Mulazzo	1469 – 1521	Marquisate of Villafranca	Bianca di Collalto five children	1521 aged 80–81?	Children of Gian Spinetta I, divided the marquisate.
Azzo II	c.1450 Son of Azzo I	1470 – 1515	Marquisate of Pregola	Unknown at least one child	1515 aged 74–75	
Paolo I	c.1440 First son of Azzone I	1473 – 1517	Marquisate of Mulazzo	Unknown nine children	1517 aged 76–77?	Sons of Azzone, divided their inheritance. Their brother Antonio II founded the smaller branch of Marquesses of Montereggio.
Cristoforo I	c.1440 Second son of Azzone I	1473 – 1511	Marquisate of Groppoli	Unknown five children	1511 aged 70–71?	Sons of Azzone, divided their inheritance. Their brother Antonio II founded the smaller branch of Marquesses of Montereggio.
Guglielmo I	c.1460 Son of Gian Giorgio and Costanza	1502 – September 1527	Marquisate of Tresana	Paola Arrigoni Benedetta Pio four children (in total)	September 1527 aged 66–67	Was murdered.
Federico	c.1470 First son of Jacopo Ambrogio and Caterina Suardi	1506–1537	Marquisate of Lusuolo	Antonia Malaspina of Tresana two children	1537 aged 66–67	Shared the marquisate of Lusuolo. Antonio was ousted of rulership by Federico's son, Girolamo Ambrogio.
Antonio	c.1470 Second son of Jacopo Ambrogio and Caterina Suardi	1506–1537	Marquisate of Lusuolo	Anna Malaspina of Mulazzo five children	1542 aged 71–72	Shared the marquisate of Lusuolo. Antonio was ousted of rulership by Federico's son, Girolamo Ambrogio.
Teodoro	c.1470 Third son of Jacopo Ambrogio and Caterina Suardi	1506 – 1536	Marquisate of Lusuolo	Angelica Medici five children	1536 aged 65–66	Shared the marquisate of Lusuolo. Antonio was ousted of rulership by Federico's son, Girolamo Ambrogio.
Rolando	c.1470 Fourth son of Jacopo Ambrogio and Caterina Suardi	1506 – 1524	Marquisate of Lusuolo	Mattea Malaspina of Fosdinovo one child	1524 aged 53–54	Shared the marquisate of Lusuolo. Antonio was ousted of rulership by Federico's son, Girolamo Ambrogio.
Oliviero I	c.1500 Son of Azzo II	1515 – 1563	Marquisate of Pregola	Unknown at least one child	1563 aged 62–63	
Azzone II	c.1490 First son of Cristoforo	1517 – 1554	Marquisate of Groppoli	Francesca Malaspina of Filattiera one child	1554 aged 63–64	Also shared a part of Mulazzo. In 1549 his son-in-law inadvertently sold Groppoli to Tuscany, leading to five years of litigation in the Aulic Council.
Moroello III	c.1490 Son of Paolo I	1517 – 1573	Marquisate of Mulazzo	Caterina Malaspina of Gragnola five children	1573	Shared in condominium the Marquisate of Mulazzo, rule that would apply to the descendants of Paolo and Cristoforo.
Gian Gaspare I	c.1490 Second son of Cristoforo	1517 – 1531	Marquisate of Mulazzo	Margherita Malaspina of Lusuolo two children	1531 aged 40–41	Shared in condominium the Marquisate of Mulazzo, rule that would apply to the descendants of Paolo and Cristoforo.
Bonifazio I	c.1490 Son of Paolo I	1517 – 1555	Marquisate of Madrignano	Nicola Spinola three children Grazia Calcagnini no children	1555 aged 64–65	Received the marquisate of Madrignano in inheritance of his father.
Gian Battista	c.1480 First son of Tommaso I and Bianca di Collalto	1521 – 1562	Marquisate of Castevoli	Margherita Malaspina of Mulazzo five children	1562 aged 81–82?	Children of Tommaso I, divided their inheritance.
Bartolomeo I	c.1480 Second son of Tommaso I and Bianca di Collalto	1521 – 1549	Marquisate of Villafranca	Ottavia Malaspina? five children	1549 aged 68–69	Children of Tommaso I, divided their inheritance.
Regency of Benedetta Pio (1528-c.1540)						
Francesco Guglielmo I	1528; Posthumous son of Guglielmo I and Benedetta Pio	1528 – 9 July 1574	Marquisate of Tresana	Unknown four children	9 July 1574 aged 45–46	
Jacopo I	c.1490 First son of Gian Spinetta II and Maddalena Malaspina of Gragnola	1528 – 1573	Marquisate of Licciana	Maria Lucrezia Malaspina of Lusuolo three children	1573 aged 82–83	Children of Gian Spinetta II, divided their inheritance.
Fioramonte	c.1490 Second son of Gian Spinetta II and Maddalena Malaspina of Gragnola	1528 – 1574	Marquisate of Bastia	Caterina Passeri-Bonacolsi nine children	1574; Cortemaggiore aged 83–84	Children of Gian Spinetta II, divided their inheritance.
Rinaldo I	c.1490 Third son of Gian Spinetta II and Maddalena Malaspina of Gragnola	1528 – 1562	Marquisate of Suvero	Lavinia Malaspina of Villafranca four children	1562 aged 71–72	Children of Gian Spinetta II, divided their inheritance.
Leonardo I	c.1490 Son of Gian Spinetta II and Maddalena Malaspina of Gragnola	1528 – 1565	Marquisate of Podenzana	Caterina Orlandi eight children	1565 aged 74–75	Children of Gian Spinetta II, divided their inheritance.
Girolamo Ambrogio Comparino	c.1530? Son of Federico and Antonia Malaspina of Tresana	1537 – 1616	Marquisate of Lusuolo	Susanna Malaspina of Mulazzo Maddalena Cerati five children (in total)	1616 aged 85–86?	After his death without surviving children, Lusuolo was annexed by the Grand Duchy of Tuscany.
Lusuolo annexed by the Grand Duchy of Tuscany
Federico IV	c.1530 Son of Bartolomeo I Malaspina, Marquis of Villafranca and Ottavia Malaspina?	1549 – 1580	Marquisate of Villafranca	Elena Cybo five children	1580 aged 49–50	
Briseide	c.1520 Daughter of Azzone II and Francesca Malaspina of Filattiera	1554 – 1555	Marquisate of Groppoli (under litigation with Tuscany)	Ascanio Landi at least one child?	1560? aged 39–40?	Inherited from her father, but the marquisate, at the point, was in legal dispute at the Aulic Council, after her husband had sold it to Tuscany during her father's rule. The case took five years to be resolved, and was returned to Gian Cristoforo, grandson of Cristoforo I.
Stefano I	c.1530 Son of Bonifazio I	1555 – 1594	Marquisate of Madrignano	Silvia Malaspina of Mulazzo five children	1594 aged 63–64	A colleric and libidinous man, hated by his vassals.
Gian Cristoforo I	c.1510 Son of Gian Gaspare, Marquis of Mulazzo and Margherita Malaspina of Lusuolo	1555 – 1574	Marquisate of Groppoli	Nicola Vivaldi five children	1574; 63-64	Grandson of Cristoforo I. Also had a share in condominium in Mulazzo since 1531.
Tommaso I	c.1530 Third son of Gian Battista Malaspina, Marquis of Villafranca and Margherita Malaspina of Mulazzo	1562 – 1605	Marquisate of Castevoli	Bianca Sicco four children Marzia Malaspina of Podenzana four children	1605 aged 74–75	His brother Alfonso founded the branch of Marquesses of Stadomelli.
Torquato I	c.1530 Son of Rinaldo I and Lavinia Malaspina of Villafranca	1562 – 1594	Marquisate of Suvero	Euridice Malaspina of Madrignano (1570–1602) one child	1594; Ferrara aged 63–64	
Gian Maria	c.1540 Son of Oliviero I	1563 – 1605	Marquisate of Pregola	Unknown at least one child	c.1605 aged 64–65	
Alessandro I	c.1530 Son of Leonardo I and Caterina Orlandi	1565 – 1587	Marquisate of Podenzana	Dejanira-Bianca Malaspina of Villafranca four children	1587 aged 56–57	
Alfonso	1540; Son of Jacopo I and Maria Lucrezia Malaspina of Lusuolo	1573 – 1608	Marquisate of Licciana	Regina of Cles; 1565 twelve children	1608 aged 67–68	Sons of Jacopo I, shared the marquisate of Licciana.
Lucio Cornelio I	c.1540 Son of Jacopo I and Maria Lucrezia Malaspina of Lusuolo	1573 – 1616	Marquisate of Licciana	Bartolomea Formentini five children	1616 aged 75–76	Sons of Jacopo I, shared the marquisate of Licciana.
Francesco Antonio	c.1530 Second son of Moroello III and Caterina Malaspina of Gragnola	1573 – 1590	Marquisate of Mulazzo	Mattea Malaspina of Podenzana; 1577 two children	1590 aged 59–60	
Camillo I	c.1540 First son of Fioramonte and Caterina Passeri-Bonacolsi	1574 – 1619	Marquisate of Bastia	Beatrice Malaspina of Tresana (d.1616) eight children	1619 aged 74–75	Children of Fioramonte, divided their inheritance. In 1617, Fabrizio sold his marquisate to the Grand Duchy of Tuscany.
Giulio I	c.1540 Second son of Fioramonte and Caterina Passeri-Bonacolsi	1574 – 1587	Marquisate of Ponte Bosio	Euridice Biagiotti two children	1587 aged 46–47	Children of Fioramonte, divided their inheritance. In 1617, Fabrizio sold his marquisate to the Grand Duchy of Tuscany.
Fabrizio	c.1540 Third son of Fioramonte and Caterina Passeri-Bonacolsi	1574 – 1617	Marquisate of Terrarossa	Lucrezia three children	1621 aged 76–77	Children of Fioramonte, divided their inheritance. In 1617, Fabrizio sold his marquisate to the Grand Duchy of Tuscany.
Terrarossa briefly annexed to the Grand Duchy of Tuscany
Francesco Guglielmo II	c.1540 Son of Francesco Guglielmo I	1574 – 1613	Marquisate of Tresana	Susanna Malaspina of Montereggio (d.1616) seven children	1613 aged 72–73	
Gian Gaspare II	c.1530 Son of Gian Cristoforo I and Nicola Vivaldi	1574 – 1577	Marquisate of Groppoli	Caterina Malaspina of Mulazzo one child	1584 aged 53–54	In 1577, Tuscany took a brief control over the fief, before returning it to Mulazzo. Shared Mulazzo in condominium until his death.
Groppoli briefly annexed to Tuscany (1577-1586), and then to Mulazzo
Bartolomeo II	c.1560 Son of Federico IV and Elena Cybo	1580 – 1622	Marquisate of Villafranca	Laura d'Este three children	1622 aged 61–62	
Leonardo II	c.1560 Son of Alessandro I and Dejanira Bianca Malaspina of Villafranca	1587 – 1637	Marquisate of Podenzana	Luigia Malaspina of Fosdinovo (b.12 January 1587) five children	1637 aged 76–77	
Ludovico I	c.1570 Son of Giulio I and Euridice Biagiotti	1587 – 1659	Marquisate of Ponte Bosio	Silvia of Diana four children	1659 aged 88–89?	
Moroello IV	c.1570 Son of Francesco Antonio and Mattea Malaspina of Podenzana	1590 – 1657	Marquisate of Mulazzo	Caterina Malaspina of Mulazzo (1614–1664) ten children	1657 aged </smallaged 86–87?>	Shared in condominium the Marquisate of Mulazzo. Gian Cristoforo II sold his part to his cousin Francesco Maria (nephew of Antonio Maria and brother of Caterina, wife of Moroello IV). Groppoli was sold, in 1592, to the Sale family.
Antonio Maria	c.1570 Son of Gian Cristoforo I and Nicola Vivaldi	1590 – 1600	Marquisate of Mulazzo	Euridice Malaspina of Castevoli six children	1600 aged 29–30	Shared in condominium the Marquisate of Mulazzo. Gian Cristoforo II sold his part to his cousin Francesco Maria (nephew of Antonio Maria and brother of Caterina, wife of Moroello IV). Groppoli was sold, in 1592, to the Sale family.
Gian Cristoforo II	c.1570 Son of Antonio Maria and Euridice Malaspina of Castevoli	1600 – 1617	Marquisate of Mulazzo	Agnese Ricci Lucrezia Rinaldi; 1610 six children (in total)	1643 aged 72–73	Shared in condominium the Marquisate of Mulazzo. Gian Cristoforo II sold his part to his cousin Francesco Maria (nephew of Antonio Maria and brother of Caterina, wife of Moroello IV). Groppoli was sold, in 1592, to the Sale family.
Francesco Maria	c.1570 Son of Antonio Maria and Euridice Malaspina of Castevoli	1617 – 1635	Marquisate of Mulazzo	Ippolita Malaspina of Castevoli five children	1635 aged 64–65	Shared in condominium the Marquisate of Mulazzo. Gian Cristoforo II sold his part to his cousin Francesco Maria (nephew of Antonio Maria and brother of Caterina, wife of Moroello IV). Groppoli was sold, in 1592, to the Sale family.
Bonifazio II	c.1550 First son of Stefano I and Silvia Malaspina of Mulazzo	1594 – 1596	Marquisate of Madrignano	Diana di Passano one child	1596 aged 45–46	Took his father as example, probably being as hated as him. Ended assassinated in 1596.
Rinaldo II	c.1570 Son of Torquato I and Euridice Malaspina of Madrignano	1594 – 1639	Marquisate of Suvero	Maria del Carretto two children	1639 aged 68–69	In 1627, Rinaldo became involved in a conflict with the Olivola line (Spino Fiorito). In 1631 received Madrignano from his maternal uncle, Giulio Cesare. However, after his own death, this land reverted to Mulazzo.
Regency of Diana di Passano, assisted by imperial nominated admnistrators (1596–1601)						Died as a minor. His uncle Giulio Cesare then took the reins of the marquisate.
Stefano II	6 September 1592; Son of Bonifazio I	1596 – 1601	Marquisate of Madrignano	Unmarried	1601 aged 8–9	Died as a minor. His uncle Giulio Cesare then took the reins of the marquisate.
Giulio Cesare	c.1550 Second son of Stefano I and Silvia Malaspina of Mulazzo	1601 – 25 November 1631	Marquisate of Madrignano	Isabella Grassi one child	25 November 1631 aged 80–81	After his accession, and given his predecessors' behaviours, the inhabitants rebelled against him, and offered the marquisate to the Republic of Genoa. The republic asked Gianbattista Doria to oppress the rebellion, but it was Cosimo Centurione, afraid of the rebellion spreading to his own feuds, that subjugated the Madrignano populace to Giulio Cesare's rule. With no surviving descendants, left the marquisate to Rinaldo II Malaspina, Marquis of Suvero, son of his sister Euridice.
Madrignano annexed by Suvero, and then reverted to Mulazzo in 1639
Antonio Maria	c.1560 Son of Gian Maria	1605 – 1626	Marquisate of Pregola	Maria Malaspina of Fabbrica three children	1626 aged 65–66	
Francesco	1598; Son of Niccolò Malaspina of Castevoli and Clarice della Gherardesca	1605 – 1649	Marquisate of Castevoli	Beatrice Baglioni four children	1649 aged 50–51	Grandson of Tommaso I, his predecessor.
Guglielmo II	1596; Son of Francesco Guglielmo II	1613 – 6 August 1651	Marquisate of Tresana	Anna Malaspina of Olivola (1603–1675); September 1613 one child	6 August 1651 aged 54–55	After his death the marquisate was annexed by the Grand Duchy of Tuscany.
Tresana annexed by the Grand Duchy of Tuscany
Ferdinando	1568; Son of Alfonso and Regina of Cles	1616 – 29 July 1619	Marquisate of Licciana	Isabella Malaspina of Olivola three children	29 July 1619 aged 50/51	Had a suspicious character. His rule was marked by various incidents. Died assassinated by his own brother, and it is told that at the time Ferdinando's wife tried to defend him with pistols.
Camillo II	c.1600 Son of Carlo Malaspina of Bastia	1619 – 1629	Marquisate of Bastia	Unmarried	1629 aged 28–29?	Grandson of his predecessor. Left no descendants, and the marquisate went to his uncle, Ippolito
Obizzo I	1569; Son of Alfonso and Regina of Cles	29 July 1619 – 1641	Marquisate of Licciana	Amedea de Chevron three children	1641 aged 50–51	
Annibale	c.1590 Son of Bartolomeo II and Laura d'Este	1622 – 1652	Marquisate of Villafranca	Caterina di Ricasoli-Riario; 1611 two children	1652 aged 61–62	
Oliviero II	c.1590 First son of Antonio Maria and Maria Malaspina of Fabbrica	1626 – 1630	Marquisate of Pregola	Unmarried	c.1630 aged 39–40	
Ippolito	c.1570 Son of Camillo I and Beatrice Malaspina of Tresana	1629 – 1645	Marquisate of Bastia	Taddea Malaspina of Tresana; 1627 six children	1645 aged 74–75	
Niccolò	c.1590 Second son of Antonio Maria and Maria Malaspina of Fabbrica	1630 – 1655	Marquisate of Pregola	Ortensia Guidobono-Cavalchini (d.1622) at least one child	1655 aged 64–65	
Francesco Maria I	10 September 1619; Son of Leonardo II and Luigia Malaspina of Fosdinovo	1637 – 12 October 1676	Marquisate of Podenzana	Maria Caterina Lucrezia Malaspina of Mulazzo six children	12 October 1676; Podenzana aged 57	
Pier Torquato II	c.1590 Son of Rinaldo II and Maria del Carretto	1639 – 1663	Marquisate of Suvero	Caterina della Seta three children	1663 aged 72–73	
Jacopo II	1621; Son of Obizzo I and Amedea de Chevron	1641 – 11 June 1659	Marquisate of Licciana	Bianca Rangoni three children	11 June 1659 aged 37–38	
Francesco	3 August 1631; Son of Fioramonte and Taddea Malaspina of Tresana	1645 – 1695	Marquisate of Bastia	Scolastica Zambini thirteen children	1695 aged 63–64	
Tommaso II	1615; Son of Francesco and Clarice della Gherardesca	1649	Marquisate of Castevoli	Camilla Arrighi three children	1649 aged 33–34	
Niccolò	c.1640 Son of Tommaso II and Camilla Arrighi	1649 – 1676	Marquisate of Castevoli	Unmarried	1676 aged 35–36	
Niccolò	c.1615 Son of Annibale and Caterina di Ricasoli-Riario	1652 – 1697	Marquisate of Villafranca	Isabella Molza; 1611 nine children	1697 aged 81–82	
Antonio	c.1630 Son of Niccolò and Ortensia Guidobono-Cavalchini	1655 – 1692	Marquisate of Pregola	Veronica Carlì (d.1715) two children	1692 aged 61–62	
Cesare Maria	c.1610 Son of Francesco Maria and Ippolita Malaspina of Castevoli	1657 – 7 December 1697	Marquisate of Mulazzo	Caterina Baglioni two children	7 December 1697 aged 86–87	Shared in condominium the Marquisate of Mulazzo. After his death with no surviving descendants, his part of Mulazzo returned to the descendant and namesake of Gian Cristoforo II, Gian Cristoforo III.
Azzo Giacinto I	c.1610 Son of Moroello IV and Caterina Malaspina of Mulazzo	1657 – 1674	Marquisate of Mulazzo	Pannina Fogiliani (d.1665) eight children	1674 aged 63–64	Shared in condominium the Marquisate of Mulazzo. After his death with no surviving descendants, his part of Mulazzo returned to the descendant and namesake of Gian Cristoforo II, Gian Cristoforo III.
Giulio II	c.1600 Son of Ludovico I and Silvia of Diana	1659 – 1662	Marquisate of Ponte Bosio	Laura Farsetti five children	1662 aged 61–62	
Obizzo II	1641; Son of Jacopo II and Bianca Rangoni	11 June 1659 – 1704	Marquisate of Licciana	Paola Cechinelli six children	1704 aged 62–63	
Ferdinando	c.1640 Son of Giulio II and Laura Farsetti	1662 – 1722	Marquisate of Ponte Bosio	Vittoria Farsetti; 1661 six children	1722 aged 81–82?	
Francesco Antonio I	c.1630 Son of Pier Torquato II and Caterina della Seta	1663 – 1714	Marquisate of Suvero	Elisabetta Malaspina of Olivola (24 May 1636 – 12 January 1712); 1658 three children	1714 aged 83–84?	
Clarice	c.1640 First daughter of Tommaso II and Camilla Arrighi	1676 – 1678	Marquisate of Castevoli	Gian Battista Gherardi unknown children	1678 aged 37–38	After her death, the marquisate passed to her sister.
Alessandro II	31 October 1659; Son of Francesco Maria I and Maria Caterina Lucrezia Malaspina of Mulazzo	12 October 1676 – 1719	Marquisate of Podenzana	Euridice Malaspina of Suvero (d.1716) three children	1719 aged 59–60	
Elena	c.1645 Second daughter of Tommaso II and Camilla Arrighi (?)	1678 – 1720?	Marquisate of Castevoli	c.1680 seven children	c.1720? aged 74–75?	Their marriage reunited the lands of Stadomelli and Castevoli.
Alfonso	c.1660? Son of Scipione, Marquis of Stadomelli and Maria Spinola	1679 – 1722	Marquisate of Castevoli	c.1680 seven children	1722 aged 61–62	Their marriage reunited the lands of Stadomelli and Castevoli.
Carlo	c.1670 Son of Antonio and Veronica Carlì	1692 – 1740	Marquisate of Pregola	Lucrezia Malaspina of Treschietto; 1697 no children Giovanna Paleari one child	c.1740 aged 69–70	
Serafino	c.1670 Son of Francesco and Scolastica Zambini	1695 – 1736	Marquisate of Bastia	Teresa Borri three children	1736 aged 65–66	
Giovanni I	c.1650 Son of Niccolò and Isabella Molza	1697 – 1725	Marquisate of Villafranca	Gliceria Stanga seven children	1725 aged 74–75	
Gian Cristoforo III	c.1680? Son of Obizzo Malaspina of Mulazzo and Anna Maria Cardi/Maria Felice Cambi	1697 – 1765	Marquisate of Mulazzo	Dejanira Malaspina of Podenzana (d.26 May 1772); 1717 two children	1765 aged 84–85?	Shared in condominium the Marquisate of Mulazzo. Gian Cristoforo III was a cousin of Cesare Maria.
Carlo Maria	c.1640 Son of Azzo Giacinto I and Pannina Fogiliani	1697 – 1705	Marquisate of Mulazzo	Luigia Malaspina of Podenzana ten children	1705; Piacenza aged 64–65	Shared in condominium the Marquisate of Mulazzo. Gian Cristoforo III was a cousin of Cesare Maria.
Azzo Giacinto II	c.1680 Son of Carlo Maria and Luigia Malaspina of Podenzana	1705 – 1746	Marquisate of Mulazzo	Lucrezia Avogadro five children	1746 aged 65–66	Shared in condominium the Marquisate of Mulazzo. Gian Cristoforo III was a cousin of Cesare Maria.
Jacopo Antonio	c.1670 Son of Obizzo II and Paola Cechinelli	1704 – 1741	Marquisate of Licciana	Barbara Cavalca twelve children	15 December 1741; Licciana aged 70–71	
Torquato III	1667; Son of Francesco Antonio I and Elisabetta Malaspina of Olivola	1714 – 1736	Marquisate of Suvero (at 2/3)	Livia Galetti (d.1746) six children	1736 aged 68–69	Children of Francesco Antonio, divided their inheritance. In 1733, Torquato faced a Spanish invasion which destroyed his castle. After Euridice's death, her share was inherited by Podenzana.
Euridice	c.1670 Daughter of Francesco Antonio I and Elisabetta Malaspina of Olivola	1714 – 1716	Marquisate of Suvero (at 1/3)	Alessandro II, Marquis of Podenzana three children	1716 aged 39–40	Children of Francesco Antonio, divided their inheritance. In 1733, Torquato faced a Spanish invasion which destroyed his castle. After Euridice's death, her share was inherited by Podenzana.
1/3 of Suvero annexed to Podenzana
Francesco Maria II	c.1680 Son of Alessandro II and Euridice Malaspina of Suvero	1719 – 1754	Marquisate of Podenzana	Beatrice Obizzi seven children	1754; Vienna aged 73–74	
Ludovico II	c.1680 Son of Ferdinando and Vittoria Farsetti	1722 – 1748	Marquisate of Ponte Bosio	Teresa Maffei six children	1748 aged 67–68	
Scipione II	c.1690? First son of Alfonso II and Elena	1722 – 1744	Marquisate of Castevoli	Unmarried	1744 aged 53–54	Without descendants, the marquisate passed to his brother.
Azzo Federico V Estense	c.1690? Son of Giovanni I and Gliceria Stanga	1725 – 1786	Marquisate of Villafranca	Dorotea Ratta nine children	1786 aged 95–96?	Gained the epithet Estense from Rinaldo d'Este, Duke of Modena, in 1726.
Giovanni	c.1700 Son of Serafino and Teresa Borri	1736 – 6 January 1783	Marquisate of Bastia	Anna Malaspina of Mulazzo (28 November 1727 – 1797) four children	6 January 1783 aged 82–83	After his death with no male descendants, Bastia was absorbed by Ponte Bosio.
Bastia annexed to Ponte Bosio
Rinaldo III	c.1700 Son of Torquato III and Livia Galetti	1736 – 1770	Marquisate of Suvero	Unmarried	1770 aged 69–70	After his death without descendants, the marquisate passed to his brother, Francesco Antonio.
Corrado IV	1724; Son of Carlo and Giovanna Paleari	1740 – August 1777	Marquisate of Pregola	Maria Teresa del Pozzo (1754-1795) three children	August 1777 aged 52–53	During his rule, Corrado controlled only 1/9 of the original marquisate, which was split between other branches of the Malaspinas. After his death, his widow surrendered the marquisate to the Grand Duchy of Tuscany.
Pregola annexed to Tuscany
Obizzo Paolo	c.1690 Second son of Alfonso II and Elena	1744 – 1759	Marquisate of Castevoli	Edvige Malaspina of Suvero four children	1759 aged 68–69	
Cornelio II	c.1710 Son of Jacopo Antonio and Barbara Cavalca	1741 – 1778	Marquisate of Licciana	Vittoria Olivazzi five children	1778; Parma aged 67–68	
Giulio III	c.1700 Son of Ludovico II and Teresa Maffei	1748 – 8 September 1762	Marquisate of Ponte Bosio	Chiara Cusani (b.13 October 1707) four children	8 September 1762 aged 61–62	
Regency of Beatrice Obizzi (1754-1757)						Left no descendants. The marquisate passed to his younger brother Alfonso.
Alessandro III	1729; First son of Francesco Maria II and Beatrice Obizzi	1754 – 13 September 1789	Marquisate of Podenzana	Unmarried	13 September 1789; Florence aged 59–60	Left no descendants. The marquisate passed to his younger brother Alfonso.
Tommaso III	5 November 1749; Villafranca; Son of Obizzo Paolo and Edvige Malaspina of Suvero	1759 – 1797	Marquisate of Castevoli	Luigia Malaspina of Ponte Bosio five children	16 July 1834; Villafranca aged 84	In 1796 reunited Castevoli and Villafranca, but he was deposed by Napoleon Bonaparte in 1797 with the latter's invasion of Northern Italy and subsequent end of the Feudal Age.
Claudio	c.1730 Son of Giulio III and Chiara Cusani	8 September 1762 – 1797	Marquisate of Ponte Bosio (with Bastia from 1783)	Anna Malaspina of Olivola (d.1783); 1764 six children	22 December 1803 aged 72–73	Reunited, in 1783, the marquisates of Bastia and Ponte Bosio. Claudio was deposed by Napoleon Bonaparte in 1797 with the latter's invasion of Northern Italy and subsequent end of the Feudal Age.
Cesare	1709; Son of Gian Cristoforo III and Dejanira Malaspina of Podenzana	1765 – 1776	Marquisate of Mulazzo	Unmarried	c.1780 aged 70–71	Shared in condominium the Marquisate of Mulazzo. In 1776, Cesare gave to Carlo Moroello's son his part on the marquisate.
Carlo Moroello	1709; Son of Azzo Giacinto II and Lucrezia Avogadro	1765 – 1774	Marquisate of Mulazzo	Caterina Meli-Lupi (d.27 June 1798); 1745 thirteen children	1774; Florence aged 64–65	Shared in condominium the Marquisate of Mulazzo. In 1776, Cesare gave to Carlo Moroello's son his part on the marquisate.
Francesco Antonio II	16 December 1714; Son of Torquato III and Livia Galetti	1770 – 1771	Marquisate of Suvero	Livia Saporitti two children	1771 aged 56–57	
Torquato IV	22 June 1769; Son of Francesco Antonio II and Livia Saporitti	1771 – 1797	Marquisate of Suvero	Teresa Garimberti eleven children	1827; Parma aged 57–58	Deposed by Napoleon Bonaparte in 1797 with the latter's invasion of Northern Italy and subsequent end of the Feudal Age.
Azzo Giacinto III	23 December 1746; Mulazzo; Son of Carlo Moroello and Caterina Meli-Lupi	1776 – 1797	Marquisate of Mulazzo	Unmarried	1800 aged 53–54	First sole marquis of Mulazzo since the 16th century. However, he would be also the last, as the called Feudal Age in Italy ended with the invasion of Northern Italy in 1797 by Napoleon Bonaparte. One of his brothers was the famous Alejandro Malaspina.
Ignazio	2 May 1714; Son of Jacopo Antonio and Barbara Cavalca	1778 – 31 December 1794	Marquisate of Licciana (at Licciana proper)	Margherita of Rossillon; 1767 three children	31 December 1794 (aged 80)	Children of Jacopo Antonio, divided their inheritance. Montese was inherited by Barbara's husband's family.
Barbara	c.1740 Daughter of Jacopo Antonio and Barbara Cavalca	1778 – c.1795	Marquisate of Licciana (at Montese)	Pier Luigi della Rosa Prati at least one child	c.1795? (aged 54–55?)	Children of Jacopo Antonio, divided their inheritance. Montese was inherited by Barbara's husband's family.
Montese annexed to Prati family
Giovanni II	c.1730 Son of Azzo Federico V Malaspina and Dorotea Ratta	1786 – 1796	Marquisate of Villafranca	Isabella Molza; 1611 nine children	1809 aged 78–79	In 1796, he was deposed by the marquis of Castevoli, who reunited the two marquisates.
Villafranca annexed by Castevoli
Alfonso	1737; Second son of Francesco Maria II and Beatrice Obizzi	13 September 1789 – 1797	Marquisate of Podenzana	Unmarried	1797; Florence aged 49–50	Left no descendants. In 1796 reunited Licciana and Podenzana, but died at the wake of the invasion of Napoleon Bonaparte.
Amedea Gaspara	7 September 1777; Licciana; Daughter of Ignazio and Margherita of Rossillon	31 December 1794 – 1796	Marquisate of Licciana	Massimiliano Montecuccoli; 1794 unknown children	8 March 1847 aged 69	Deposed or abdicated for her kin, the marquis of Podenzana, who united both marquisates.
Licciana inherited by Podenzana

Smaller Spino Secco marquisates

==== Marquisate of Cavatore (1402) ====
(partitioned from Cremolino)

- 1402-1465: Giovanni I (c.1380?-1465), son of Gian Isnardo of Cremolino (r.1355-1385). Married Luchina Adorno (d.1476) and had one child.
- 1465-1483: Antoniotto (c.1420-1483), son of previous. Married Violante and had 5 children.
- 1483-1525: Ludovico (c.1440-1525), son of previous. Had one child.
- 1525-1529: Giovanni II (c.1460-1529), son of Gian Giorgio, brother of Ludovico. Married (1510) Tommasina Adorno and had one child
- 1529-1550: Violante (c.1510-1550), daughter of previous. Married (1530) Johann Baptist von Lodron (1480-1555) and had at least one child

==== Marquisate of Santo Stefano (1407) ====
(partitioned from Mulazzo)

- 1407-1475: Ghisello I (c.1390?-1475), son of Antonio I of Mulazzo (r.1365-1407) and Sofia Buzzacarini. Had 5 children.
- 1475-1525: Francesco I (c.1440-1525), son of previous. Had 5 children.
- 1525-1560: Ghisello II (c.1480-1560), son of previous. Married Bettina Fregoso (d.1506), and had one child.
- 1560-1590: Francesco II (c.1530-1590), son of previous. After his death Santo Stefano returned to Mulazzo.

==== Marquisate of Cariseto (1407) ====
(partitioned from Mulazzo)

- 1407-1477: Antonio II (c.1390?-1477), son of Antonio I of Mulazzo (r.1365-1407) and Sofia Buzzacarini.
- 1477-1525: Antonio III (c.1440-1525), son of previous. Had 5 children.
- 1525-1560: Pietro (c.1480-after 1540), illegitimate son of previous. In 1540 he sold his lands to the Fieschi family.

==== Marquisate of Montereggio (1473) ====
(partitioned from Mulazzo) 1st line

- 1473-1522: Antonio II (c.1440?-1522), son of Azzone I of Mulazzo (r.1407-1473). Had one child.
- 1522-1526: Gian Vincenzo I (c.1490?-1526), son of previous. Married Constanza Malaspina of Villafranca, and had 3 children.
- 1526-1584: Taddea (c.1510?-1584), daughter of previous. Married (1530):

2nd line

- 1530-1584: Gian Paolo (c.1510?-1584), son of Moroello III of Mulazzo (r.1517-1573). Married (1530) Taddea and had 5 children.
- 1584-1595: Gian Vincenzo II (c.1550?-1595), son of previous. Married Margherita Malaspina of Licciana and had 3 children.
- 1595-1625: Gian Vincenzo III (c.1570?-1625), son of previous. Married Isabella Sanvitale of Fontanellato and had one child.
- 1625-1646: Ottavio (c.1590?-1646), son of previous. Married Matilde Malaspina of Mulazzo (d.1680) and had no children. Montereggio reverted to Mulazzo.

==== Marquisate of Edifizi (1475) ====
(partitioned from Santo Stefano)

- 1475-1500: Pietro (c.1440-1500), son of Ghisello I of Santo Stefano.
- 1500-1525: Ghisello II (c.1460-1525), son of previous.
- 1500-1550: Gaspare Vincenzo (c.1480-1550), son of previous.
- 1550-1624: Pier Francesco (c.1530?-1624?), son of previous. After his death Edifizi returned to Mulazzo.

==== Marquisate of Monti (1528) ====
(partitioned from Licciana)

- 1528-1578: Moroello (c.1490-1578), son of Gian Spinetta II of Licciana (r.1469-1528) and Maddalena Malaspina of Gragnola. Married Lucrezia Stroggi-Maggi and had one child.
- 1578-1582: Orazio (c.1530-1582), son of previous. Married Lucrezia and had no children. Monti reverted to Licciana.

==== Marquisate of Stadomelli (1562) ====
(partitioned from Castevoli)

- 1562-1585: Alfonso I (c.1530-1585), son of Gian Battista of Castevoli (r.1521-1562) and Margherita Malaspina of Mulazzo. Married Anna Sicco and had 4 children.
- 1585-1615: Marzio (c.1560-1615), son of previous. Married Margherita Tedeschi and had 6 children.
- 1615-1679: Scipione (c.1610-1679), son of previous. Married Maria Spinola and had 3 children.
- 1679-1722: Alfonso II (c.1660-1722), son of previous, also Marquis of Castevoli jue uxoris (see above)

=== Malaspina del Spino Fiorito ===
Partitions of Lunigiana under Malaspina del Spino Fiorito rule

Marquisate of Malaspina del Spino Fiorito
Marquisate of Godiasco (1254–1339)	Marquisate of Olivola (1st creation) (1254–1413)
Marquisate of Verrucola (1254–1418)	Marquisate of Varzi (1289–1776)
Marquisate of Filattiera (1339-1535)	Marquisate of Treschietto (1339–1716)	Marquisate of Malgrate (1339–1615)
Marquisate of Castel dell'Aquila (1367–1441)
Marquisate of Fosdinovo (1340–1797)
Marquisate of Olivola (2nd creation, Fosdinovo line (1451– 1796)	Marquisate of Gragnola (1451–1642)
Duchy of Massa and Carrara (1467–1553)
Sold to Tuscany
Marquisate of Oramala (1549–1797)
Inherited by Cybo family
Sold to Spain
Marquisate of Terrarossa (2nd creation, Filattiera line) (1628–1787)
Sold to Tuscany
Sold to Savoy
Sold to Tuscany

Table of rulers

Ruler	Born	Reign	Death	Ruling part	Consort	Notes
Alberto	c.1240 Son of Obizzo III and Caterina della Volta	1249 – 1320	Marquisate of Godiasco	Fiesca Fieschi eight children	1320 aged 79–80	Children of Obizzo III, divided the marquisate.
Bernabò I	c.1240 Son of Obizzo III and Caterina della Volta	1249 – 1265	Marquisate of Olivola	Anna Maria of Sicily three children	1265 aged 24–25	Children of Obizzo III, divided the marquisate.
Isnardo I	c.1240 Son of Obizzo III and Caterina della Volta	1249 – June 1275	Marquisate of Verrucola	Cubitosa d'Este (b.1233) eight children	June 1275 aged 34–35	Children of Obizzo III, divided the marquisate.
Regency of Anna Maria of Sicily (1265–1275)						
Francesco	1262; Son of Bernabò I and Anna Maria of Sicily	1265 – 1339	Marquisate of Olivola	Unknown six children	1339 aged 76–77	
Cubitosa d'Este	c.1233 Daughter of Azzo VII d'Este and Giovanna di Puglia	June 1275 – 1277	Marquisate of Verrucola	Isnardo I (1240-June 1275) eight children	c.1280 aged 46–47	Widow and son of Isnardo, they may have shared power in Verrucola. Cubitosa was in control of the fortress at least for two years, before abdicating to her son. Gabriele and Azzolino divided their inheritance.
Gabriele	c.1260 First son of Isnardo I and Cubitosa d'Este	June 1275 – 1289	Marquisate of Verrucola	Unknown seven children	1289 aged 28–29	Widow and son of Isnardo, they may have shared power in Verrucola. Cubitosa was in control of the fortress at least for two years, before abdicating to her son. Gabriele and Azzolino divided their inheritance.
Azzolino I	c.1260 Second son of Isnardo I and Cubitosa d'Este	June 1275 – 1320	Marquisate of Varzi	Agnese dei Vegi three children	1320 aged 59–60	Widow and son of Isnardo, they may have shared power in Verrucola. Cubitosa was in control of the fortress at least for two years, before abdicating to her son. Gabriele and Azzolino divided their inheritance.
Isnardo II	c.1280 First son of Gabriele	1289 – 1351	Marquisate of Verrucola	Angelica Verona five children	1351 aged 70–71	Sons of Isnardo I, shared Verrucola. Azzolino's descendants would later rule the Marquisate of Fosdinovo.
Azzolino II	c.1280 Second son of Gabriele	1289 – 1327	Marquisate of Verrucola	Giovanna Cagnoli five children	1327 aged 46–47	Sons of Isnardo I, shared Verrucola. Azzolino's descendants would later rule the Marquisate of Fosdinovo.
Niccolò	c.1280 First son of Alberto and Fiesca Fieschi	1320 – 1339	Marquisate of Godiasco	Beatrice Malaspina of Mulazzo seven children	1339 aged 58–59	Brothers and co-rulers. The sons of Niccolò divided the territory between them after their father's death.
Manfredo I	c.1280 Second son of Alberto and Fiesca Fieschi	1320–1330	Marquisate of Godiasco	Unmarried	1330 aged 49–50	Brothers and co-rulers. The sons of Niccolò divided the territory between them after their father's death.
Federico I	c.1300 First son of Azzolino I and Agnese di Vegi	1320 – 1369	Marquisate of Varzi	Simona Landi five children	1320 aged 59–60	His brother Obizzo founded the branch of Marquesses of Fabbrica.
Domenico	c.1290 Son of Francesco	1339 – 1355	Marquisate of Olivola	Unknown two children	1355 aged 64–65	
Riccardo	c.1340 Son of Obizzo Malaspina of Godiasco and Taddea Malaspina of Fosdinovo	1339 – 1392	Marquisate of Filattiera	Teodora Grimaldi of Genoa seven children	1392 aged 51–52	Heirs of Niccolò. His grandchild (Riccardo, son of Niccolò's son Obizzo) and his sons (uncles of Riccardo) divided the marquisate. However, all heirs retained a fraction of the old capital, Godiasco.
Giovanni I Beretta	c.1310 Second son of Niccolò and Beatrice Malaspina of Mulazzo	1339 – 1375	Marquisate of Treschietto	Masina Picciolini four children	1375 aged 64–65	Heirs of Niccolò. His grandchild (Riccardo, son of Niccolò's son Obizzo) and his sons (uncles of Riccardo) divided the marquisate. However, all heirs retained a fraction of the old capital, Godiasco.
Bernabò	c.1310 Fourth son of Niccolò and Beatrice Malaspina of Mulazzo	1339 – 1368	Marquisate of Malgrate	Unknown one child	1368 aged 57–58	Heirs of Niccolò. His grandchild (Riccardo, son of Niccolò's son Obizzo) and his sons (uncles of Riccardo) divided the marquisate. However, all heirs retained a fraction of the old capital, Godiasco.
Spinetta I the Great	1282; Verrucola; Third son of Gabriele, Marquis of Verrucola	1340 – March 1352	Lordship of Fosdinovo	Beatrice Visconti of Milan (b.1280); 1310 three children	March 1352; Fosdinovo aged 69–70	In 1340, Spinetta became ruler of Fosdinovo, taking it from the Republic of Lucca, and founded a new marquisate. However, left no male descendants, nominating his nephews (sons of his brother Azzolino) as heirs.
Niccolò	c.1330 Son of Isnardo II and Angelica Verona	1351 – 1416	Marquisate of Verrucola	Unknown three children	1416 aged 85–86?	
Galeotto I	c.1310 Son of Azzolino, Marquis of Verrucola and Giovanna Cagnoli	March 1352 – 15 March 1367	Lordship of Fosdinovo (until 1355) Marquisate of Fosdinovo (from 1355)	Argentina Grimaldi of Genoa three children	15 March 1367; Fosdinovo aged 56–57	His feud was elevated to a Marquisate in 1355, by Charles IV, Holy Roman Emperor.
Marco	c.1340 Son of Domenico	1355 – 1404	Marquisate of Olivola	Doralice Malaspina five children	1404 aged 63–64	
Gabriele I	c.1330 Fosdinovo; First son of Galeotto I and Argentina Grimaldi of Genoa	15 March 1367 – 1390	Marquisate of Fosdinovo	Unmarried	1390; Fosdinovo aged 59–60	Children of Galeotto I, divided their inheritance. Gabriele left no descendants, and the marquisate was inherited by his other brother, Spinetta.
Leonardo I	c.1340 Fosdinovo; Third son of Galeotto I Malaspina, Marquis of Fosdinovo and Argentina Grimaldi of Genoa	15 March 1367 – 13 July 1403	Marquisate of Castel dell'Aquila	Caterina Rossi or Caterina Malaspina of Lusuolo six children	13 July 1403 aged 62–63	Children of Galeotto I, divided their inheritance. Gabriele left no descendants, and the marquisate was inherited by his other brother, Spinetta.
Niccolò	c.1340 Son of Bernabò	1368 – 1408	Marquisate of Malgrate	Unknown two children	1408 aged 67–68	
Giovanni I	c.1350 First son of Federico and Simona Landi	1369 – 1425	Marquisate of Varzi	Unknown five children	1425 aged 74–75?	
Federico the German	c.1340 Son of Giovanni I and Masina Picciolini	1375 – 1419	Marquisate of Treschietto	Unknown seven children	1419 aged 78–79	
Spinetta II	c.1330 Fosdinovo; Second son of Galeotto I and Argentina Grimaldi of Genoa	1390 – 1398	Marquisate of Fosdinovo	Giovanna Gambacorta no children Margherita Barbiano; 1390 two children	1398; Fosdinovo aged 67–68	
Niccolò II	c.1390 First son of Riccardo and Teodora Grimaldi of Genoa	1392 – 1472	Marquisate of Filattiera	Rosana Malaspina of Villafranca no children	1472 aged 81–82	Children of Riccardo, they probably shared rule in Filattiera.
Bernabò I	c.1390 Second son of Riccardo and Teodora Grimaldi of Genoa	1392 – 1468	Marquisate of Filattiera	Giovanna Malaspina of Bagnone four children	1468 aged 77–78	Children of Riccardo, they probably shared rule in Filattiera.
Regency of Margherita Barbiano (1398–1414)						Acquired the Lordship of Carrara in 1442.
Antonio Alberico I	c.1370 Fosdinovo; Son of Spinetta II and Margherita Barbiano	1398 – 9 April 1445	Marquisate of Fosdinovo	Giovanna Malaspina of Verrucola; 1418 five children	9 April 1445; Fosdinovo aged 74–75	Acquired the Lordship of Carrara in 1442.
Leonardo II	c.1370 Son of Leonardo I and Caterina Rossi/Caterina Malaspina of Lusuolo	13 July 1403 – 1441	Marquisate of Castel dell'Aquila	Ginevra Visconti of Milan (1385–1418) one child	1441 aged 70–71	Brothers, they shared the fief. Despite surviving his brother, Galeotto possibly had to hand over the marquisate to Fosdinovo, as the land was reabsorbed by Fosdinovo and (probably because Galeotto had no male heirs) given to a new heir in 1445, with Galeotto still living.
Galeotto I	c.1370 Son of Leonardo I and Caterina Rossi/Caterina Malaspina of Lusuolo	13 July 1403 – 1441	Marquisate of Castel dell'Aquila	Samaritana Foscari one child Mattea Bevilacqua four children	1441 aged 70–71	Brothers, they shared the fief. Despite surviving his brother, Galeotto possibly had to hand over the marquisate to Fosdinovo, as the land was reabsorbed by Fosdinovo and (probably because Galeotto had no male heirs) given to a new heir in 1445, with Galeotto still living.
Castel dell'Aquila absorbed by Fosdinovo
Giovanni	c.1370 First son of Marco and Doralice Malaspina	1404 – 1411	Marquisate of Olivola	Unmarried	1411 aged 40–41	Left no descendants. The marquisate went to his brother.
Bartolomeo	c.1380 Son of Niccolò	1408 – 1456	Marquisate of Malgrate	Eleonora Vignoli of Lodi three children	1456 aged 75–76	Received, from his paternal grandmother (or his father) half of the land of Valverde.
Bernabò II	c.1370 Second son of Marco and Doralice Malaspina	1411 – 1413	Marquisate of Olivola	Unmarried	1413; Varano aged 42–43	In 1413, on the same day, he and his brothers were assassinated. Olivola was eventually absorbed by the Marquisate of Fosdinovo.
Olivola annexed to Fosdinovo
Bartolomeo	c.1360 Son of Niccolò	1416 – 1418	Marquisate of Verrucola	Margherita Anguissola two children	1418 aged 57–58	After his death, Verrucola was absorbed by the still recent Marquisate of Fosdinovo.
Verrucola annexed to Fosdinovo
Giovanni II	c.1380 First son of Federico	1419 – 1454	Marquisate of Treschietto (at Treschietto proper)	Unknown two children	1454 aged 73–74	His brother Dondazio founded the branch of Marquesses of Corlaga.
Bernabò	c.1380 First son of Giovanni I	1425 – 1453	Marquisate of Varzi	Unknown at least one child	1453 aged 72–73?	His brothers Cristoforo and Antonio founded, respectively, the branches of Marquesses of Santa Margherita and Lunassi.
Jacopo I	1422; Fosdinovo; First son of Antonio Alberico I and Giovanna Malaspina of Verrucola	9 April 1445 – 17 November 1467	Marquisate of Fosdinovo	Taddea Pico; May 1446 five children	18 May 1481; Massa aged 58–59	Children of Antonio Alberico I, divided their inheritance. In 1467, Jacopo abdicated from Fosdinovo to his brother Gabriele, and ruled solely in Massa-Carrara, where he established a short-lived independent line. Lazzaro revived the marquisate of Castel dell'Aquila, now with capital at Gragnola, establishing a relatively longer line of marquesses than the previous one. He also linked himself with the older Gragnola line by marriage with a daughter of the still living Galeotto I, previous holder of the marquisate.
Jacopo I	1422; Fosdinovo; First son of Antonio Alberico I and Giovanna Malaspina of Verrucola	17 November 1467 – 18 May 1481	Marquisate of Massa and Carrara	Taddea Pico; May 1446 five children	18 May 1481; Massa aged 58–59	
Lazzaro	1428; Fosdinovo; Second son of Antonio Alberico I and Giovanna Malaspina of Verrucola	9 April 1445 – 4 July 1451	Marquisate of Gragnola	Caterina Malaspina of Castel dell'Aquila (1432 – 20 March 1500) one child	4 July 1451 aged 22–23	
Leonardo III	c.1450 Son of Lazzaro and Caterina Malaspina of Gragnola	4 July 1451 – 28 June 1505	Marquisate of Gragnola	Aurante Orsini; 1476 five children	28 June 1505 aged 54–55	
Antonio I	c.1430 Son of Bernabò	1453 – 1508	Marquisate of Varzi	Unknown at least one child	1508 aged 69–70?	
Andrea I	c.1410 Son of Giovanni II	1454 – 1477	Marquisate of Treschietto	Unknown two children	1477 aged 66–67	
Malgrate	c.1420 Son of Bartolomeo and Eleonora Vignoli of Lodi	1456 – 1499	Marquisate of Malgrate	Margherita Malaspina of Mulazzo Caterina Spinola two children (in total)	1499 aged 78–79	Sons of Bartolomeo, ruled jointly. Their brother Ludovico founded the branch of Marquesses of Valverde.
Ercole I	c.1420 Son of Bartolomeo and Eleonora Vignoli of Lodi	1456 – 1480	Marquisate of Malgrate	Unmarried	1480 aged 59–60	Sons of Bartolomeo, ruled jointly. Their brother Ludovico founded the branch of Marquesses of Valverde.
Gabriele II	1435; Fosdinovo; Third son of Antonio Alberico I and Giovanna Malaspina of Verrucola	17 November 1467 – 3 February 1508	Marquisate of Fosdinovo	Bianca Malaspina of Gragnola (1439–1516); May 1456 or 1468 five children	3 February 1508; Fosdinovo aged 72–73	In 1467, received from his brother Jacopo the marquisate of Fosdinovo, following the latter's abdication.
Manfredo II	c.1430 Son of Bernabò I and Giovanna Malaspina of Bagnone	1472 – 1493	Marquisate of Filattiera	Bernardina Isembardi three children	1493 aged 62–63	
Gian Lorenzo I	c.1450 Son of Andrea I	1477 – 1512	Marquisate of Treschietto	Elisabetta Gambarana three children	1512 aged 61–62	
Antonio Alberico II	c.1450? Massa; Son of Jacopo I and Taddea Pico	18 May 1481 – 13 April 1519	Marquisate of Massa and Carrara	Lucrezia d'Este; 1490 four children	13 April 1519; Massa aged 68–69	Sons of Jacopo I, probably rule jointly.
Francesco	c.1450? Massa; Son of Jacopo I and Taddea Pico	18 May 1481 – 2 August 1484	Marquisate of Massa and Carrara	Costanza Fogliani; December 1477 four children	24 August 1484; Massa aged 33–34	Sons of Jacopo I, probably rule jointly.
Bernabò II	c.1470 Son of Manfredo II and Bernardina Isembardi	1493 – 1514	Marquisate of Filattiera	Giovanna Maria Eustachi five children	1514 aged 43–44	Sold Cella (a part of the marquisate) to the Duchy of Milan.
Gian Battista	c.1460 Son of Malgrate and Margherita Malaspina of Mulazzo/Caterina Spinola	1499 – 1513	Marquisate of Malgrate	Adriana Guidoboni one child	1513 aged 52–53	
Galeotto II	c.1480 First son of Leonardo III and Aurante Orsini	28 June 1505 – 1544	Marquisate of Gragnola	Isabella Maggi two children	1544 aged 53–54	Brothers, they ruled jointly.
Giovanni	c.1480 Son of Leonardo III and Aurante Orsini	28 June 1505 – 1550	Marquisate of Gragnola	Unknown six children	1550 aged 59–60	Brothers, they ruled jointly.
Lorenzo	c.1470 Fosdinovo; First son of Gabriele II and Bianca Malaspina of Gragnola	3 February 1508 – 1533	Marquisate of Fosdinovo	Teodosia Mattea Malaspina of Gragnola; 1501 three children	1533; Fosdinovo aged 62–63	Brothers, they shared the marquisate of Fosdinovo.
Galeotto II	c.1470 Fosdinovo; Second son of Gabriele II and Bianca Malaspina of Gragnola	3 February 1508 – 1523	Marquisate of Fosdinovo	Zaffira Pio of Carpi; 22 July 1476 two children	1523; Fosdinovo aged 52–53	Brothers, they shared the marquisate of Fosdinovo.
Spinetta	c.1460 Son of Antonio I	1508 – 1538	Marquisate of Varzi	Unknown two children	1538 aged 77–78?	
Lazzaro I	c.1490 Son of Gian Battista Malaspina of Fosdinovo and Giovanna Rossi of Santo Secundo	1510 – 1544	Marquisate of Olivola (Fosdinovo line)	Margherita Malaspina of Licciana c.1530 nine children	1544 aged 53–54	In 1510, he received Olivola from his uncles Lorenzo and Galeotto II.
Pompeo I	c.1490 First son of Gian Lorenzo I and Elisabetta Gambarana	1512 – 1578	Marquisate of Treschietto	Unmarried	1578 aged 87–88	Probably shared the marquisate. After the death of his brother Gian Andrea, Pompeo still shared and survived his nephew Gian Lorenzo II.
Gian Andrea II	c.1490 Second son of Gian Lorenzo I and Elisabetta Gambarana	1512 – 1540	Marquisate of Treschietto	Francesca Malaspina of Lusuolo seven children	1540 aged 39–40	Probably shared the marquisate. After the death of his brother Gian Andrea, Pompeo still shared and survived his nephew Gian Lorenzo II.
Gian Lorenzo II	c.1490 Son of Gian Andrea II and Francesca Malaspina of Lusuolo	1540 – 1577	Marquisate of Treschietto	Paola Malaspina of Mulazzo two children	1577 aged 86–87	Probably shared the marquisate. After the death of his brother Gian Andrea, Pompeo still shared and survived his nephew Gian Lorenzo II.
Cesare I	c.1500 Son of Gian Battista and Adriana Guidoboni	1513 – 1549	Marquisate of Malgrate	Lucrezia Castiglioni four children	1549 aged 48–49	
Manfredo III	c.1490 Son of Bernabò II and Giovanna Maria Eustachi	1514 – 1535	Marquisate of Filattiera	Giovanna Malaspina of Olivola five children	1554 aged 63–64	In 1535 Manfredo sold Filattiera to the Grand Duchy of Tuscany.
Filattiera sold to the Grand Duchy of Tuscany
Riccarda	1497; Massa; Daughter of Antonio Alberico II and Lucrezia d'Este	13 April 1519 – 6 October 1546 27 June 1547 – 15 June 1553	Marquisate of Massa and Carrara	Scipione Fieschi c.1515 no children Lorenzo Cybo; 1520 three children	15 June 1553; Bagni di Lucca aged 55–56	Deposed once by her son, Giulio I Cybo-Malaspina, in 1546, she rapidly regained the control of her lands. She was the last of the Malaspinas in Massa-Carrara; her descendants, until then part of the Cybo family would join her name with her husband's, founding the Cybo-Malaspina family.
Massa-Carrara inherited by the Cybo family
Giuseppe	c.1500 Fosdinovo; Son of Lorenzo and Teodosia Mattea Malaspina of Gragnola	1533 – 1565	Marquisate of Fosdinovo	Luigia Doria; 1529 eleven children	1565; Fosdinovo aged 64–65	
Antonio II	c.1500 Son of Spinetta	1538 – 13 March 1576	Marquisate of Varzi	Unknown at least one child	13 March 1576 aged 75–76?	
Spinetta I	c.1520 Son of Lazzaro I and Margherita Malaspina of Licciana	1544 – 1590	Marquisate of Olivola (Fosdinovo line)	Eleonora della Gherardesca five children	1590 aged 69–70	
Giuseppe	c.1530 First son of Cesare I and Lucrezia Castiglioni	1549 – 1590	Marquisate of Malgrate	Giulia of Vervea two children	1590 aged 59–60	Children of Cesare I, divided their inheritance.
Ercole II	c.1530 Second son of Cesare I Malaspina, Marquis of Malgrate and Lucrezia Castiglioni	1549 – 1581	Marquisate of Oramala	Emilia Nocetti two children	1581 aged 50–51	Children of Cesare I, divided their inheritance.
Corrado	c.1500 Son of Galeotto II and Isabella Maggi	1550 – 1559	Marquisate of Gragnola	Donella Sarego; Girolama Castelbarco three children (in total)	1559 aged 58–59	
Gian Battista	c.1530 Son of Corrado and Donella Sarego/Girolama Castelbarco	1559 – 25 December 1606	Marquisate of Gragnola	Caterina Guidotti; 1563 Fiametta Soderini four children (in total)	25 December 1606 aged 75–76	Cousins, ruled jointly. Disinherited by his father, Leone managed to co-rule with his cousin's nephew. Leone was then succeeded in the co-rulership by his own son Alfonso, who also didn't outlive Gian Battista.
Leone	c.1500 Son of Giovanni	1559 – 1568	Marquisate of Gragnola	Manella Angarana six children	1568 aged 67–68	Cousins, ruled jointly. Disinherited by his father, Leone managed to co-rule with his cousin's nephew. Leone was then succeeded in the co-rulership by his own son Alfonso, who also didn't outlive Gian Battista.
Alfonso	c.1530 Son of Leone and Mandella Angarana	1568 – 1594	Marquisate of Gragnola	Ginevra Marioni (d.1612) one child	1594 aged 63–64	Cousins, ruled jointly. Disinherited by his father, Leone managed to co-rule with his cousin's nephew. Leone was then succeeded in the co-rulership by his own son Alfonso, who also didn't outlive Gian Battista.
Regency of Luigia Doria (1565–1573)						
Andrea	1544; Fosdinovo; Son of Giuseppe and Luigia Doria	1565 – 1610	Marquisate of Fosdinovo	Vittoria of Negro six children	1610; Fosdinovo aged 65–66	
Giovanni II	c.1550 Son of Antonio II	13 March 1576 – 1585	Marquisate of Varzi	Laura de Gerardi no children	1585 aged 34–35	As he left no legitimate descendants, he passed the marquisate to an illegitimate son.
Gian Gaspare I	c.1530 Son of Gian Lorenzo II and Paola Malaspina of Mulazzo	1578 – 1608	Marquisate of Treschietto	Maria Spinola Lucrezia Malaspina of Malgrate five children (in total)	1608 aged 77–78	
Pier Francesco I	c.1560 Son of Ercole II Malaspina, Marquis of Oramala and Emilia Nocetti	1581 – 1622	Marquisate of Oramala	Giulia Spinola two children	1622 aged 61–62	
Gian Antonio	5 May 1574; Illegitimate son of Giovanni II and Antonia di Sagliano	1585 – 1630	Marquisate of Varzi	Anna Malaspina of Fabbrica no children Paola Malaspina of Santa Margherita one child	1630 aged 55–56	
Cesare II	c.1570 Son of Bernabò	1590 – 1615	Marquisate of Malgrate	Margherita Malaspina one child	1615 aged 44–45	In 1615, Cesare sold the marquisate (with exceptions) to Spain.
Malgrate (with exceptions) was sold to the Kingdom of Spain
Lazzaro II	c.1560 Son of Spinetta I and Eleonora della Gherardesca	1590 – 1630	Marquisate of Olivola (Fosdinovo line)	Teodora Malaspina of Licciana nine children	1630 aged 69–70	
Cosimo	c.1570 First son of Gian Battista and Caterina Guidotti/Fiametta Soderini	25 December 1606 – 1638	Marquisate of Gragnola	Anna Malaspina of Treschietto no children	1638; Vienna aged 67–68	Had almost continuous fights with his brother Alessandro for inheritance, and desired to exclude him from it. As he left no descendants, the marquisate eventually passed to his brother.
Pompeo II	c.1570 Son of Gian Gaspare I and Maria Spinola/Lucrezia Malaspina of Malgrate	1608 – 1636	Marquisate of Treschietto	Clevia Malaspina of Lusuolo four children	1636 aged 65–66	
Jacopo II	22 October 1593; Fosdinovo; Son of Andrea and Vittoria of Negro	1610 – 1663	Marquisate of Fosdinovo	Maria Grimaldi della Rocca; 1612 twelve children	1663; Fosdinovo aged 69–70	
Lucrezia	c.1590 First daughter of Cesare II	1615 – 1650?	Marquisate of Malgrate (at 1/4 of Godiasco)	Francesco Aizaga at least one child	c.1650 aged 59–60	Heiresses of Cesare II, retained a part of the marquisate, which, after their deaths, was inherited by the Aizaga family, to which Lucrezia married.
Ottavia	c.1590 Second daughter of Cesare II	1615 – 1650?	Marquisate of Malgrate (at 1/4 of Godiasco)	Francesco Merzagora at least one child	c.1650 aged 59–60	Heiresses of Cesare II, retained a part of the marquisate, which, after their deaths, was inherited by the Aizaga family, to which Lucrezia married.
Giulia	c.1590 Third daughter of Cesare II	1615 – 1650?	Marquisate of Malgrate (at 1/4 of Godiasco)	Jeronimo Speciani at least one child	c.1650 aged 59–60	Heiresses of Cesare II, retained a part of the marquisate, which, after their deaths, was inherited by the Aizaga family, to which Lucrezia married.
Vittoria	c.1590 Fourth daughter of Cesare II	1615 – 1650?	Marquisate of Malgrate (at 1/4 of Godiasco)	Gian Giorgio Lampagnani at least one child	c.1650 aged 59–60	Heiresses of Cesare II, retained a part of the marquisate, which, after their deaths, was inherited by the Aizaga family, to which Lucrezia married.
1/4 Godiasco was inherited by the Aizaga family
Giuseppe	1593; Son of Pier Francesco I and Giulia Spinola	1622 – 1646	Marquisate of Oramala	Lucrezia Guidoboni-Cavalchini four children	1646 aged 52–53	
Manfredo I	c.1570 Son of Bernabò Malaspina of Filattiera and Eleonora Bartorelli	1628 – 1642	Marquisate of Terrarossa (Filattiera line)	Cassandra della Seta two children	1642 aged 71–72	Grandson of Manfredo III Malaspina, Marquis of Filattiera. In 1628, Ferdinando II de' Medici, Grand Duke of Tuscany gave him the marquisate of Terrarossa, which had been sold in 1617 by Fabrizio Malaspina.
Spinetta II	c.1590 Son of Lazzaro II and Teodora Malaspina of Licciana	1630 – 1655	Marquisate of Olivola (Fosdinovo line)	Mary Magdalene Dudley; 1648 twelve children	1655 agd 64-65	
Carlo Giovanni	c.1610 Son of Gian Antonio and Paola Malaspina of Santa Margherita	1630 – 1670	Marquisate of Varzi	Eleonora Spinola two children Isabella Monticelli (d.1654) no children	1670 aged 59–60?	
Gian Gaspare II	c.1620 Son of Pompeo II and Clevia Malaspina of Lusuolo	1636 – 1678	Marquisate of Treschietto	Ottavia Gorai seven children	1678 aged 57–58	
Alessandro	c.1570 Second son of Gian Battista and Caterina Guidotti/FIametta Soderini	1638 – 1642	Marquisate of Gragnola	Unmarried	1642 aged 71–72	The feud was re-absorbed by the main branch of Fosdinovo in 1644 after a dispute with the Grand Duke of Tuscany, who Alessandro had nominated to be the feud's heir.
Gragnola definitely annexed to Fosdinovo
Bernabò I	1619; Son of Manfredo I and Cassandra della Seta	1642 – 24 September 1663	Marquisate of Terrarossa (Filattiera line)	Costanza della Gherardesca six children	24 September 1663; Pisa aged 43–44	
Pier Francesco II	1630; First son of Giuseppe and Lucrezia Guidoboni-Cavalchini	1646 – 20 September 1692	Marquisate of Oramala	Unmarried	20 September 1692 aged 61–62	Left no descendants. The marquisate went to his brother, Ercole.
Giuseppe	22 December 1633; Son of Spinetta II and Mary Magdalene Dudley	1655 – 11 July 1682	Marquisate of Olivola (Fosdinovo line)	Claudia of Santa Croce no children	11 July 1682 aged 48	
Manfredo II	1642; Son of Bernabò I and Costanza della Gherardesca	24 September 1663 – 19 November 1708	Marquisate of Terrarossa (Filattiera line)	Margherita Romoli (b. 11 October 1655) two children Claudia Santa Croce three children	19 November 1708; Florence aged 65–66	
Pasquale	27 January 1622; Fosdinovo; Son of Jacopo II and Maria Grimaldi della Rocca	1663 – 8 November 1669	Marquisate of Fosdinovo	Maria Maddalena Centurione three children	8 November 1669; Fosdinovo aged 47	Left no descendants. The marquisate was inherited by his brother.
Ippolito	15 November 1628; Fosdinovo; Son of Jacopo II and Maria Grimaldi della Rocca	8 November 1669 – 15 February 1671	Marquisate of Fosdinovo	Cristina Adelaide Pallavicino of Frabosa (d.19 February 1723); 12 November 1670 one child	15 February 1671; Fosdinovo aged 42	
Mercurio I	c.1640 Son of Carlo Giovanni and Eleonora Spinola	1670 – 1702	Marquisate of Varzi	Caterina Pelosi at least one child	1702 aged 59–60?	
Regency of Cristina Adelaide Pallavicino of Frabosa (1671–1691)						
Carlo Francesco Agostino	23 November 1671; Fosdinovo; Son of Ippolito and Cristina Adelaide Pallavicino of Frabosa	15 February 1671 – 1722	Marquisate of Fosdinovo	Maria Anna Caterina Santinelli; 1693 seven children	1722; Caniparola aged 50–51	
Remigio Pompeo III	1660; First son of Gian Gaspare II and Ottavia Gorai	1678 – 1689	Marquisate of Treschietto	Leonella Dionisia Gargielli no children Eleonora Malaspina of Ponte Bosio; 1674 no children	1689 aged 28–29	
Lazzaro III	8 March 1635; Son of Spinetta II and Mary Magdalene Dudley	11 July 1682 – 14 September 1714	Marquisate of Olivola (Fosdinovo line)	Beatrice of Sylva five children	17 September 1714 aged 79	
Carlo Alessandro	c.1660 Second son of Gian Gaspare II and Ottavia Gorai	1689 – 1692	Marquisate of Treschietto	Anna Caterina Malaspina three children	1692 aged 31–32	
Ercole III Benedetto	c.1640 Son of Giuseppe and Lucrezia Guidoboni-Cavalchini	20 September 1692 – 1723	Marquisate of Oramala	Maria Spinola nine children	1723 aged 82–83	
Ferdinando	c.1660 Third son of Gian Gaspare II and Ottavia Gorai	1692 – 1722	Marquisate of Treschietto	Anna Maria Gargiolli no children	1722 aged 61–62	In 1716, Ferdinando sold the marquisate to the Grand Duchy of Tuscany
Treschietto and Piumesana sold to the Grand Duchy of Tuscany
Emmanuele	c.1690 Son of Mercurio I and Caterina Pelosi	1702 – 1775	Marquisate of Varzi	Unknown two children	1775 aged 84–85?	
Bernabò II	c.1690 Son of Manfredo II and Margherita Romoli	19 November 1708 – 12 January 1761	Marquisate of Terrarossa (Filattiera line)	Vittoria Ricciardi (1695–11 April 1775); 1715 four children	12 January 1761 aged 70–71	Supposedly also held the Marquisate of Treschietto, but it didn't pass to his descendants.
Giuseppe Massimiliano	1700; Son of Lazzaro III and Beatrice of Sylva	17 September 1714 – 1 November 1758	Marquisate of Olivola (Fosdinovo line)	Maria Teresa Malaspina of Fosdinovo (1703 – 3 November 1770); 1723 seven children	1 November 1758 (aged 57/58)	
Gabriele III	3 March 1695; Fosdinovo; Son of Carlo Francesco Agostino and Maria Anna Caterina Santinelli	1722 – 1758	Marquisate of Fosdinovo	Angelica Maria Pallavicino (d. 18 February 1732) five children Isabella Orsucci (d. 17 July 1762); 1749 eleven children	1758; Fosdinovo (aged 62/63)	
Agostino	c.1670 Son of Ercole III Benedetto and Maria Spinola	1723 – 15 July 1750	Marquisate of Oramala	Vittoria Malaspina of Oramala six children	15 July 1750 aged 79–80	
Ercole IV	c.1720 Son of Agostino and Vittoria Malaspina of Oramala	15 July 1750 – 1797	Marquisate of Oramala	Antonia Miraglia (d.4 February 1812) nine children	13 January 1805 aged 84–85	Ercole was deposed by Napoleon Bonaparte in 1797 with the latter's invasion of Northern Italy and subsequent end of the Feudal Age.
Regency of Isabella Orsucci (1758–1759)						Carlo Emanuele was deposed by Napoleon Bonaparte in 1797 with the latter's invasion of Northern Italy and subsequent end of the Feudal Age.
Carlo Emanuele	31 May 1752; Fosdinovo; Son of Gabriele III and Isabella Orsucci	1758 – 1797	Marquisate of Fosdinovo	Eugenia Pinelli Salvago no children	14 January 1808; Pisa aged 55	Carlo Emanuele was deposed by Napoleon Bonaparte in 1797 with the latter's invasion of Northern Italy and subsequent end of the Feudal Age.
Lazzaro IV	c.1730 First son of Giuseppe Massimiliano and Maria Teresa Malaspina of Fosdinovo	1 November 1758 – 1783	Marquisate of Olivola (Fosdinovo line)	Tommasina Falconi of Chiavari two children	1783 aged 52–53	Left no male heirs. The marquisate was inherited by his brother Carlo.
Manfredo III	18 January 1720; Son of Bernabò II and Vittoria Ricciardi	12 January 1761 – 2 January 1787	Marquisate of Terrarossa (Filattiera line)	Vittoria Ginori (d.23 March 1790); 1752 one child	2 January 1787 aged 66	
Mercurio II	c.1730 Son of Emmanuele	1775 – 28 November 1776	Marquisate of Varzi	Marianna Poggi seven children	28 November 1776 aged 39–40?	After his death, the marquisate was annexed to the House of Savoy.
Varzi annexed to the House of Savoy
Carlo	c.1730 Second son of Giuseppe Massimiliano and Maria Teresa Malaspina of Fosdinovo	1783 – 1797	Marquisate of Olivola (Fosdinovo line)	Unmarried	21 February 1811 aged 80–81	Deposed by Napoleon Bonaparte in 1797 with the latter's invasion of Northern Italy and subsequent end of the Feudal Age.
Vittoria Luigia	16 July 1754; Daughter of Manfredo III and Vittoria Ginori	2 January 1787 – 1787	Marquisate of Terrarossa (Filattiera line)	Giulio Barbolani; 21 October 1776 no children	28 October 1825 aged 71	She may have ruled for a few weaks or months between her father's death and the formal annexation of the marquisate to the Grand Duchy of Tuscany.
Terrarossa definitely annexed by the Grand Duchy of Tuscany

Smaller Spino Fiorito marquisates

==== Marquisate of Fabbrica (1320) ====
(partitioned from Varzi)

- 1320-1350: Obizzo (c.1300-1350), son of Azzolino I of Varzi (r.1275-1320). Had 2 children
- 1350-1390: Azzo (c.1330-1390), son of previous. No children
- 1390-1410: Bonifazio (c.1340-1410), brother of previous. Had 3 children
- 1410-1450: Pietro (c.1380-1450), son of previous. Had 2 children
- 1450-1475: Bonifazio II (c.1410-1475), son of previous. Had at least one child.
- 1475-1530: Battaglio (c.1460-1530), son of previous. Had at least one child.
- 1530-1550: Gian Battista (1490-1550), son of previous. Married Elisabetta Malaspina, heiress of Lunassi, and had at least one child.
- 1550-1600: Cristoforo I (1530-1 February 1600), son of previous. Married Laura della Pusterla, and had 4 children.
- 1600-1625: Clemente (1560-1625), son of previous. Had at least one child.
- 1625-1658: Cristoforo II (1590-25 December 1658), son of previous. Married Caterina Bussetti, with whom had 5 children and Anna Maria Perelli, with whom had one child
- 1658-1696: Bartolomeo (1630-5 August 1696, Pietragavina), son of previous and Caterina Bussetti. Married Orsola Ristori, and had one child.
- 1696-1759: Sforza Antonio (1680-1759), son of previous. Married a woman from Stampa family, with whom had two children, and Maria Vittoria della Porta, with whom had one child. After his death, the marquisate was annexed to the House of Savoy.

==== Marquisate of Bagnone (1339) ====
(partitioned from Godiasco)

- 1339-1359: Antonio (c.1310-1359), son of Niccolò of Godiasco (r.1320-1339) and Beatrice Malaspina of Mulazzo. Had 4 children.
- 1359-1427: Riccardo (c.1350-1427), son of previous. Had 3 children.
  - 1359-c.1420: Giovanna (c.1350-1430?), sister of Riccardo, married Bernabò I, Marquis of Filattiera and had three children. Giovanna shared the fief of Valverde with her brother.
- 1427-1450: Giorgio (c.1380-30 June 1450), son of Riccardo. Had 4 children.
- 1450-1471: Cristiano (c.1400-1471), son of previous. Had 4 children. In 1471, Cristiano sold his marquisate to the Republic of Florence.

==== Marquisate of Castiglione (1339) ====
(partitioned from Godiasco)

- 1339-1396: Francesco I (c.1310-1396), son of Niccolò of Godiasco (r.1320-1339) and Beatrice Malaspina of Mulazzo. Had 3 children.
- 1396-1430: Bernabò (c.1350-1430), son of previous. Had 2 children.
- 1430-1451: Francesco II (c.1400-1460), son of previous, died unmarried. In 1451, Francesco sold his marquisate to the Republic of Florence.

==== Marquisate of Corlaga (1419) ====
(partitioned from Treschietto)

- 1419-1461: Dondazio (c.1390-1461), son of Federico of Treschietto (r.1375-1419). Had 4 children.
- 1461-1523: Moroello (c.1440-1523), son of previous. Married Francesca Malaspina of Malgrate, and had 4 children.
- 1523-1535: Leonardo (c.1470-1535), son of previous. Married Anna Butini and had 2 children. After his death, Corlaga was sold to the Grand Duchy of Tuscany.

==== Marquisate of Santa Margherita (1425) ====
(partitioned from Varzi)

- 1425-1456: Cristoforo (c.1380-1456), son of Giovanni I of Varzi (r.1369-1425). Had at least one child.
- 1456-1475: Francesco (c.1400-1475), son of previous. Married Giovanna Marli, and had 3 children.
- 1475-1525: Federico (c.1450-1525), son of previous. Had 2 children.
- 1525-1565: Angelo I (c.1490-1565), son of previous. Married Teresa Malaspina of Prègola, and had 3 children.
- 1565-1605: Galeazzo (c.1530-1605), son of previous. Married Veronica Anguissola and had 3 children.
- 1605-1632: Angelo II (c.1570-1632), son of previous. Married Laura and had 7 children.
- 1632-1698: Gian Battista and Gian Agostino (both lived around 1620-1698), sons of previous. Gian Battista had 4 children; Gian Agostino married Lucrezia del Verme (1631-23 January 1705) and had no children.
- 1698-1749: Angelo III (c.1630-15 January 1749), son of Gian Battista. Married Maria Maddalena Landi and had 2 children.
- 1749-1790: Gian Galeazzo (c.1700-1790) and Francesco Agostino (c.1700-14 May 1757), sons of previous. Gian Galeazzo had 5 children; Francesco Agostino had no children. After Gian Galeazzo's death, the marquisate was annexed to the House of Savoy.

==== Marquisate of Lunassi (1425) ====
(partitioned from Varzi)

- 1425-1450: Antonio I (c.1380-1450), son of Giovanni I of Varzi (r.1369-1425), married Costanza Zanardi Landi, and had 3 children.
- 1450-1470: Federico II (c.1420-1450), son of previous. Had two children.
- 1470-1530: Cesare (c.1460-1530), son of previous. Had 3 children.
- 1530-1550: Antonio II (c.1490-1550), son of previous, married Caterina Malaspina of Treschietto, and had 2 children.
- 1550-1601: Francesco (c.1530-1601), son of previous, married Pellegra Spinola and Cornelia Ugarti. Had 2 children.
- 1601-1605: Elisabetta (c.1560-1605?) and Lelia (c.1560-1605?), daughters of previous. Elisabetta married Gian Battista, Marquis of Fabbrica, which determined Lunassi's annexation to Fabbrica. Lelia married Gian Paolo Bussetti.

==== Marquisate of Valverde (1456) ====
(partitioned from Treschietto)

- 1456-1500: Ludovico (c.1430-1500), son of Bartolomeo of Malgrate (r.1408-1456). Had one child.
- 1500-1550: Galeazzo (c.1480-1550), son of previous. Had one child.
- 1550-1600: Aragone (c.1530-1600), son of previous. Had 5 children.
- 1600-1630: Gian Paolo (c.1580-6 August 1630), son of previous. Had 2 children.
- 1630-1650: Pier Francesco (c.1600-1650), son of previous. Had no children. Probably during his reign or after his death, Valverde was sold to the Kingdom of Spain.

== Other branches ==
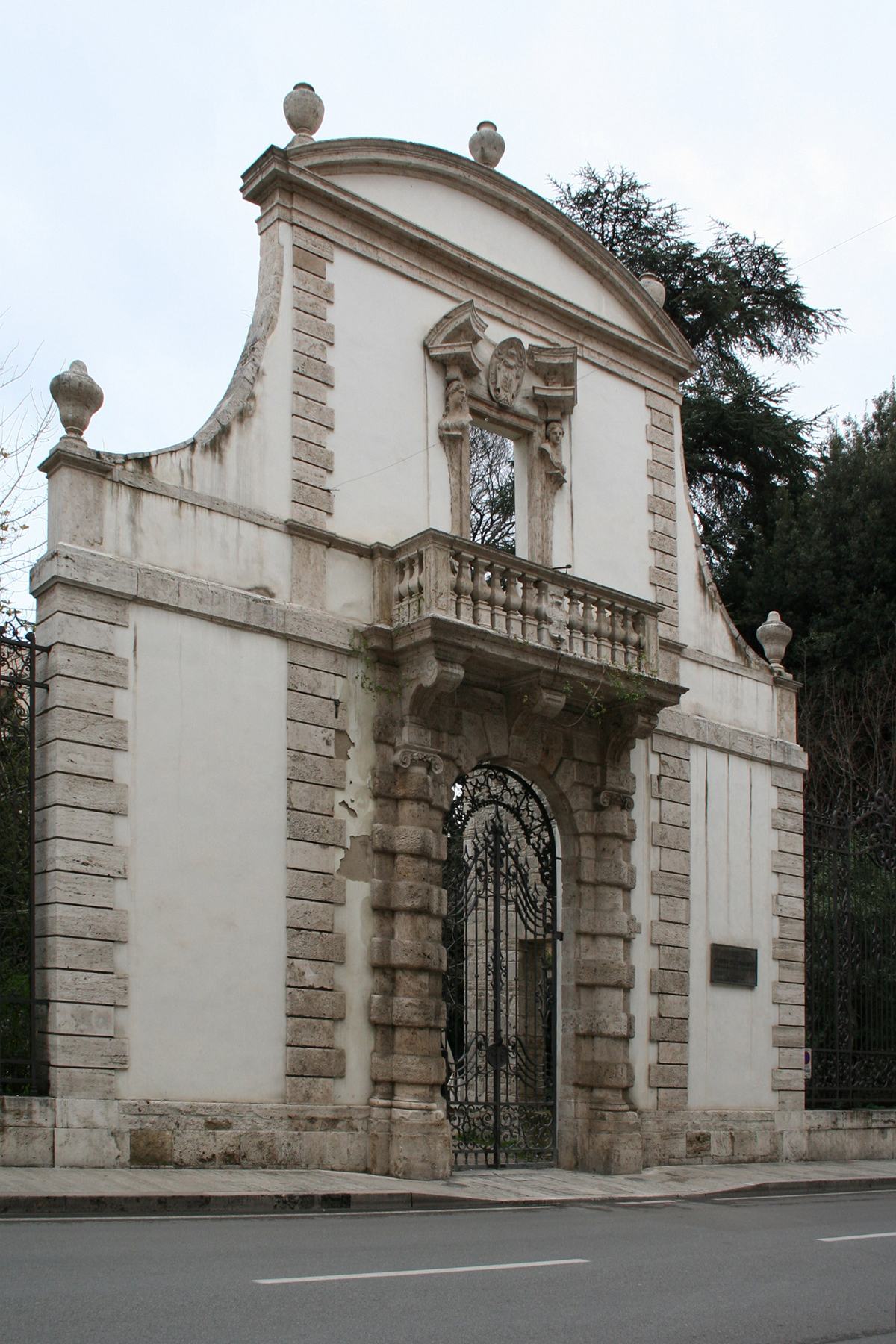
Malaspinian Baroque gate – Ascoli Piceno

- Malaspina of Ascoli Piceno, from Ascoli Piceno in Marche; the feud was later inherited by the Malatesta but the Sforza later gave it back to the Malaspina, who held it until 1502 when it was acquired by the papacy.
- Malaspina of Grondona; they only held the feud of Grondona until the end of feudalism.
- Sorce-Malaspina; their forefather was the marquis of Olivola, Giuseppe Massimiliano Malaspina (1700 – 1 November 1758). Alberico was born from Giuseppe's union with Maria Teresa Malaspina, (1703 – Pisa, 3 November 1770) (d. 1789); he married Maria Migliore in Palermo. The daughter of Maria Angelica Malaspina married Don Antonino Sorce, the heir of a rich family of Mussomeli, giving origin to the Sorce-Malaspina branch of the family. In 1770, their son Salvatore Sorce-Malaspina was born; with his wife Antonina Padronaggio he had these children:
  - Antonino Sorce Malaspina (born in 1793);
  - Vincenzo Sorce Malaspina (born in 1806), married with Donna Gaetana Sorce;
  - Maria Angelica Sorce Malaspina (born in 1801);
  - Maria Carmela Sorce Malaspina (born in 1800). The line is currently still alive thanks to the heirs of Giuseppe Mistretta, born from Cavalier Antonino and Donna Stefanina Mistretta.

=== Family members of unknown lines ===
- Ricordano Malaspina (also known as Malespini) (c. 1200 – 1281) – a historiographer from Florence. He wrote a book about the history of Florence (Istoria Fiorentina) in Italian, which was completed after his death by his grandson Giaccotto. After the battle of Montaperti (1260) he was exiled to Rome and returned to Florence after the battle of Benevento in 1266.
- Giacotto Malaspina, who documented Florence's history until 1286.
- Saba Malaspina, the secretary of Pope John XXI; he wrote the history of Sicily (Rerum sicularum, 1250–76) from a Guelph's point of view.

== Malaspina branches at mid-18th century ==
- Spino Secco:
  - Mulazzo, Montereggio and Castagnetoli (1746): Carlo Moroello 1746–74, Tuscan protectorate
  - Calice, Veppo, Madrignano, Mulazzo (1710): Gian Cristoforo 1710–63; feud given to Tuscany in 1772
  - Suvero, Monti: Rinaldo III 1736–70
  - Orezzoli, Volpedo: Marco Antonio 1691–52 (side-branch), sold to the Savoia
  - Fabbrica di Ottone (side-branch), sold to the Savoia
  - Ottone (side-branch), sold to the Savoia
  - Frassi (side-branch), sold to the Savoia
  - Villafranca, Virgoletta, Garbugliaga, Beverone: Federico III Malaspina Estense 1722–86; Modena feud
  - Castevoli, Cavanella, Stadomelli: Opizzone Paolo 1744–59, given to the Villafranca branch
  - Licciana, Monti, Panicale, Bigliolo: Cornelio 1741–78; extinct in 1794 later annexed by the Villafranca branch
  - Bastia, Varano, Monti: Giovanni 1740–83, annexed by Ponte Bosio
  - Ponte Bosio, Monti: Giulio 1748–68, from 1794 annexed by Licciana
  - Podenzana, Aulla (1710): Francesco Maria 1712–54
  - Pregola, Campi, sotto il Groppo: Corrado 1720–77 (side-branch); Ercole III of Malgrate 1750–97, sold to the Savoia.
- Spino Fiorito:
  - Fosdinovo, Gragnola, Castel dell'Aquila: Gabriele III 1722–58, imperial vicary in Italy
  - Fabbrica Curone: Antonio Sforza Malaspina 1739–59 (side-branch), sold to the Savoia
  - Santa Margherita, Menconico: Francesco Agostino 1749–57; Corrado di Pregola 1720–77 (side-branches)
  - Malgrate, Filetto, Godiasco, Oramala, Fortunago, Piumesana: Ercole IV 1750–97, partially sold to the Savoia
  - Olivola, Pallerone, Bibola: Giuseppe Massimiliano 1714–58
  - Treschietto, Valle, Corlago: Giulio di Filattiera 1710–61 (side-branch), given to Tuscany in 1698
  - Sagliano, Godiasco, Piumesana: Francesco 1743–58 (side-branch)
  - Grondona (side-branch)
  - Valverde, S.Albano, Monfalcone, Godiasco, Piumesana: Carlo Antonio 1704–59 (side-branch)
  - Varzi (side-branch), sold to the Savoia
  - Verona (side-branch), took over by Venice.

== See also ==
- Divine Comedy
- Italian nobility

== Bibliography ==
- Eugenio Branchi, Storia della Lunigiana feudale, ristampa anastatica, 3 vol., Forni, Bologna 1971.
- Umberto Burla, Malaspina di Lunigiana, Luna editore, La Spezia 2001.
- Giuseppe Caciagli, Storia della Lunigiana, Arnera, Pontedera 1992.
- Giorgio Fiori, I Malaspina, Tip.Le.Co., Piacenza 1995.
- Guido Guagnini, I Malaspina, Il Biscione, Milano 1973.
- Pompeo Litta, Famigli celebri di Italia. Malaspina, 1855. (URL)
- Patrizia Meli, Gabriele Malaspina marchese di Fosdinovo: condotte, politica e diplomazia nella Lunigiana del Rinascimento, University Press, Firenze 2008 ISBN 978-88-8453-859-8, ISBN 978-88-8453-860-4.
- Franco Quartieri, Dante e i Malaspina, in "Analisi e paradossi su 'Commedia' e dintorni", p. 141, Longo editore, Ravenna 2006 ISBN 88-8063-501-8.
- Alessandro Soddu (a cura di), I Malaspina e la Sardegna. Documenti e testi dei secoli XII-XIV, CUEC, Cagliari 2005.
- Alessandro Soddu, Struttura familiare e potere territoriale nella signoria dei Malaspina, in "Giornale Storico della Lunigiana e del territorio Lucense", LV (2004), pp. 135–152, 2007.
- Alessandro Soddu, Poteri signorili in Sardegna tra Due e Trecento: i Malaspina, in "RiMe. Rivista dell'Istituto di Storia dell'Europa Mediterranea", 4 (June 2010), pp. 95–105 [Atti del "12th Annual Mediterranean Studies Congress: Sardinia: A Mediterranean Crossroads", Cagliari 27–30 May 2009] on line http://rime.to.cnr.it/
- Alessandro Soddu, "Magni baroni certo e regi quasi". I Malaspina fra Lunigiana, Lucca e Sardegna, in "Acta Historica et Archaelogica Mediaevalia", 30 (2009–2010), pp. 251–260, 2011.
