= Cabello (surname) =

Cabello is a Spanish and Italian surname.

== People ==
Notable people with the surname include:

- Alba Cabello (born 1986), Spanish synchronized swimmer
- Camila Cabello (born 1997), Cuban-American singer and actress
- Diosdado Cabello (born 1963), Venezuelan politician
- Francisco Cabello (born 1969), Spanish professional road bicycle racer
- Francisco Cabello (born 1972), Argentine professional tennis player
- Glenna Cabello (born 1959), Venezuelan political scientist
- José David Cabello (born 1969), Venezuelan politician
- Victoria Cabello (born 1975), Italian television presenter

== See also ==
- Cabello, a genus of spiders
- Cabella (surname)
