= Terrarossa =

- Frazione
- Location of Terrarossa in Italy
- Coordinates: 44°14′N 09°57′E
- Country: Italy
- Region: Tuscany
- Province: Massa-Carrara (MS)
- Comune: Licciana Nardi

Population (2009)
  - Total: 1,594
- Time zone: UTC+1 (CET)
  - Summer (DST): UTC+2 (CEST)
- Postal code: 54019
- Dialing code: 0187

Terrarossa is a frazione of the comune of Licciana Nardi in the Province of Massa-Carrara in the Italian region of Tuscany.

In recent years there has been a substantial increase in the population. The river Magra, the largest in all of Lunigiana, goes through the territory.

Terrarossa is home to one of the many Malaspina castles.

Terrarossa (also known as Terrarossa Colombo due to its purported connections to Christopher Columbus) is as well the name of a frazione of the comune of Moconesi in the Province of Genoa in the Italian region of Liguria.
