= Opizzo Malaspina =

Italian marquis

Opizzo III Malaspina known as Opizzino (late 11th century - 1254) was the forefather of the Spino Fiorito branch of the Malaspina Family.

Coat of arms of the House of Malaspina (Spino Fiorito)

== Biography ==
Opizzo Malaspina was born around the end of the 12th century from Guglielmo Malaspina and he's most famous for being the forefather of the branch of the Spino Fiorito in the Malaspina family.

=== Marriage and children ===
Although there is no certain information, Opizzo's wife is thought to be Caterina di Niccolò Della Volta of Genoa, we know however that she certainly had four children: Franceschino, Bernabò, Isnardo and Alberto.

=== Agreements and career ===
The first reference to Opizzo in the oath of concord between the Malaspina and the cities of Milan and Piacenza dates back to 1212, an agreement previously signed by his father Guglielmo and Conrad Malaspina. Together with his father in 1213, he made arrangements with the municipality of Lucca. From 1220 he became the head of the family following the death of his father, even though from the year before he had held important positions starting from his participation in the Genoese expedition against the Ventimiglia family. At a later time, Opizzo also broke the agreement previously signed with the municipality of Piacenza for having occupied the fortification of Pietracorva.

=== The birth of the Spino Fiorito branch ===
Between April and August 1221 Opizzo and Conrad (the old) completed the first great division of the family's heritage. The dominion of the family was divided into two parts which gave rise to the branch of the Spino Fiorito (literally meaning "blooming thorn") with Opizzo as its progenitor and to the branch of the Spino Secco (literally meaning "dried thorn") with Conrad (the old). The division was preceded by the preventive division of Albert's legacy between his father Guglielmo and his great-uncle Conrad. The resolution of disputes related to the inheritance and the confirmation of the rights of all the assets that Opizzo and Corrado held in the Lombard-Ligurian area and in Lunigiana was definitively confirmed at the request of Emperor Frederick II in 1220. The division assigned various properties to Opizzo in the Lombard-Ligurian Apennine area, such as the castle of Pietracorva, the castle of Oramala and the Staffora valley; in Lunigiana, on the other hand, the lands to the left of the Magra river having Filattiera as their capital. Moreover, he took over the debt that the family had with Petraccio Belengario and Armando del Rizolo accumulated for the toll of the Trebbia valley. Despite the family division the two branches continued to act according to a common scenario in the local and international political field.

=== Relations with the Empire ===
Opizzo had good relations with Emperor Frederick II, who already existed shortly after the coronation of the latter; in fact, the Emperor was a guest for a whole month at Oramala in 1238. After confirming the possessions and rights of 1220, Opizzo and Conrad (the old) actively participated in the itinerant curia of Frederick II in northern and central Italy supporting his campaigns but not with a leading role. In 1229 Opizzo allied with Piacenza in the struggle against Pontremoli to consolidate the dominion of the Malaspina family, support for the countryside was above all military, in fact between August and September 1229 the armed contingents of Opizzo and Conrad (the old) participated in the war. The alliance with Piacenza persisted so much that Opizzo was elected podestà of the pars militum (military peace) during the internal struggle that characterized the city until 1234 when he signed the peace with the podestà of the opposing party (the Popolo "people"), the Cremonese Belengerio Mastagio. When the relations between the Empire and the Lombard cities became tense, from 1236 the Malaspinas also suffered the consequences. In fact, in the same year, the family was expelled from Piacenza. From 1239 Opizzo and Conrad supported the emperor in the union led by Marquis Manfredo II Lancia for Ligury against Lombardy; however, in 1246 the alliance with Frederick II was interrupted because Opizzo and Conrad lined up with Milan and Piacenza against the imperial part. While the separation of Conrad was temporary, that of Opizzo was permanent. In fact, in 1247 Opizzo sided against the emperor in the union commanded by King Enzo. At a later time, Bernabò's and Frederick I Malaspina joined the battle in Lunigiana and were defeated losing Filattiera. The following years were marked by the contention of the village of Pontremoli, lost with the previous defeat and that the Malaspinas reconquered in 1249 thanks also to the rediscovered relationship of Opizzo with Conrad. However, the affair ended with the return of the village to the imperial vicar for financial reasons as the village had been assigned to Nicolò Fieschi, Count of Lavagna by William II of Holland. The last documentation referring to Opizzo still alive dates back to 1253; from this date on, there is no verifiable information up to the approximate date of the death probably before April 1255.
