= Cabella (surname) =

Cabella is a surname. Notable people with the surname include:

- Rémy Cabella (born 1990), French professional footballer
- Salvatore Cabella (1896–1965), Italian water polo player

== See also ==
- Cabella (disambiguation)
- Cabello (surname)
