= Cabello =

- female C. eugeni

Scientific classification
- Domain: Eukaryota
- Kingdom: Animalia
- Phylum: Arthropoda
- Subphylum: Chelicerata
- Class: Arachnida
- Order: Araneae
- Infraorder: Araneomorphae
- Family: Theridiidae
- Genus: Cabello; Levi, 1964
- Species: C. eugeni

Binomial name
- Cabello eugeni Levi, 1964

Genus of spiders

The spider genus Cabello consists of only one species, Cabello eugeni, found in Venezuela. It is a small yellow-white spider, with females 2 mm long, and males 1.6 mm. The eye region is reddish with a dusky median longitudinal band, the sternum whitish, with grey sides. The yellow-white legs have scattered black spots on the anterior face. On the abdomen there are scattered white spots.

== Name ==
The genus is named after the city Puerto Cabello in Venezuela. The species is named after Eugène Simon, who collected the first specimen in 1888, on a coffee plantation on the north slope of Mt. Silla.
