= Adamo Giuseppe Galeazzi =

Italian politician (1919–2015)

President of the Province of Massa-Carrara
- In office 1963–1965
- Succeeded by: Carlo Malatesta

Personal details
- Born: 20 September 1919 Comano, Province of Massa-Carrara, Kingdom of Italy
- Died: 20 December 2015 (aged 96) Aulla, Tuscany, Italy
- Party: Christian Democracy
- Occupation: Accountant, labour consultant

Adamo Giuseppe Galeazzi (20 September 1919 – 20 December 2015) was an Italian politician and labour consultant. A member of Christian Democracy, he served as president of the Province of Massa-Carrara from 1963 to 1965.

== Life and career ==
Galeazzi began working as a labour consultant in 1943, establishing a professional practice in Aulla. Over the following decades, he became a prominent figure in the commercial community of Lunigiana.

He served multiple terms as mayor of Comano and as a member of the Provincial Council of Massa-Carrara, becoming president of the province in 1963. He retired from in politics after the end of his last term as mayor of Comano in 1992. On 19 April 2002, he was awarded the Star of Merit of Labour.

Galeazzi died in Aulla on 20 December 2015, aged 96.
