= Osvaldo Angeli =

Italian politician (born 1944)

President of the Province of Massa-Carrara
- In office 27 May 2003 – 30 April 2013
- Preceded by: Franco Gussoni
- Succeeded by: Narciso Buffoni

Mayor of Podenzana
- In office 3 August 1993 – 14 June 2004
- Preceded by: Enzo Manenti
- Succeeded by: Riccardo Varese

Personal details
- Born: 5 February 1944 (age 82) Casola in Lunigiana, Province of Apuania, Kingdom of Italy
- Party: Italian Communist Party; Democratic Party of the Left; Democrats of the Left; Democratic Party

Osvaldo Angeli (born 5 February 1944) is an Italian politician who served as president of the Province of Massa-Carrara from 2003 to 2014.

== Life and career ==
Angeli was born in Casola in Lunigiana in 1944. He worked at the INMA shipyards in La Spezia and later for Ferrovie dello Stato. He served as a municipal councillor in Aulla, mayor of Podenzana from 1993 to 2004, provincial councillor of Massa-Carrara and president of the Lunigiana mountain community.

A member of the Italian Communist Party, Angeli became the party's final provincial secretary in Massa-Carrara before its dissolution in 1991. He subsequently became the first provincial secretary of the Democratic Party of the Left, and later joined the Democrats of the Left and the Democratic Party (PD).

In the 2003 provincial election, Angeli was elected president of the Province of Massa-Carrara with 55.11% of the vote, defeating Lucio Barani, the centre-right candidate. Angeli was re-elected in 2008, defeating Sandro Bondi, the People of Freedom candidate, in the runoff with 55.4% of the vote. Following the expiration of the term in April 2013, Angeli was appointed extraordinary commissioner of the province, pending the reform of the provincial governments.

In May 2014, he was removed from the PD membership register for at least two years after supporting the mayoral candidacy of Riccardo Varese in Podenzana, in opposition to the party's official candidate. Angeli disputed the authority of the local party body to expel him and stated that he had already returned his party membership card.
