= Silvio Pellerano =

Italian politician (1858–1927)

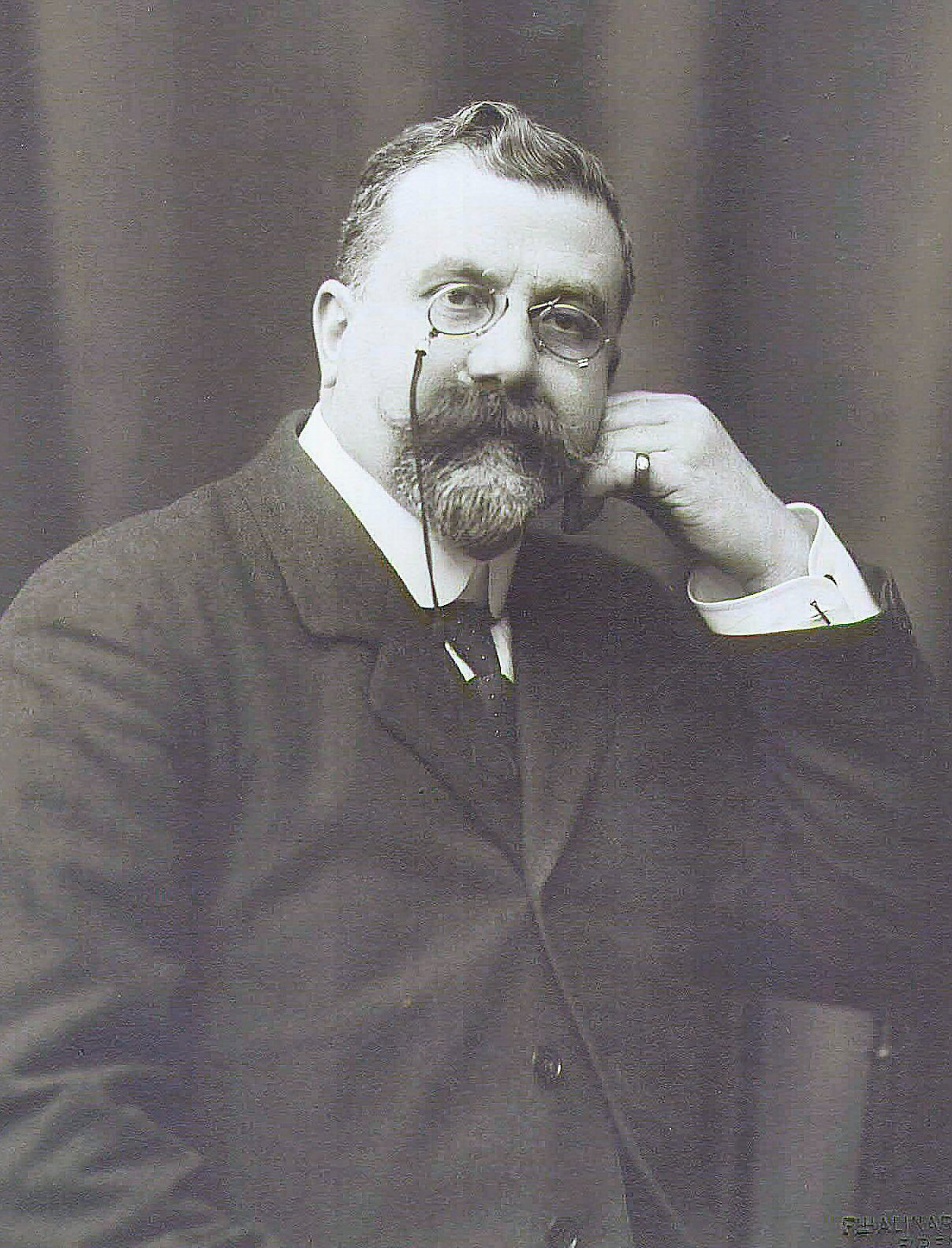

Senator of the Kingdom of Italy
- In office 30 December 1914 – 7 May 1927

Member of the Chamber of Deputies
- In office 23 November 1892 – 2 March 1897
- In office 30 November 1904 – 29 September 1913

President of the Province of Massa-Carrara
- In office 1902–1904
- Preceded by: Cesare Betti
- Succeeded by: Ferdinando Quartieri

Mayor of Massa
- In office 7 December 1889 – 26 March 1892
- Preceded by: Cesare Cecchieri
- Succeeded by: Giuseppe Luciani

Personal details
- Born: 16 March 1858 Massa, Duchy of Modena and Reggio
- Died: 7 May 1927 (aged 69) Florence, Kingdom of Italy
- Occupation: Lawyer, business executive

Silvio Pellerano (16 March 1858 – 7 May 1927) was an Italian lawyer, business executive and politician. He served as mayor of Massa, president of the Province of Massa-Carrara, municipal councillor and assessor in Florence, and was a member of the Chamber of Deputies for four legislatures. In 1914, he was appointed a senator of the Kingdom of Italy.
