= Angelo Paoli =

17th-century Italian Carmelite friar and priest beatified by the Catholic Church

Blessed Angelo Paoli O.Carm.
- Engraved portrait of Angelo Paoli by Niccolò Billy

Priest
- Born: 1 September 1642; Argigliano, Casola in Lunigiana, Massa Carrara, Grand Duchy of Tuscany
- Died: 20 January 1720 (aged 77); Rome, Papal States
- Venerated in: Roman Catholic Church
- Beatified: 25 April 2010, Basilica di San Giovanni Laterano, Italy by Archbishop Angelo Amato
- Major shrine: Santi Silvestro e Martino ai Monti
- Feast: 20 January
- Attributes: Carmelite habit

Angelo Paoli, O.Carm (born Francesco; 1 September 1642 – 20 January 1720) was an Italian Catholic priest in the Carmelite Order. He became known as the "father of the poor" due to his strong charitable outreach, for which he received praise from a number of cardinals and other prelates while living in Rome. This extended to his friend Cardinal Giuseppe Maria Tomasi and to Popes Innocent XII and Clement XI, who both offered him the cardinalate, which he refused.

Paoli's beatification was celebrated on 25 April 2010 in the Basilica di San Giovanni Laterano, with Archbishop Angelo Amato presiding on behalf of Pope Benedict XVI.

== Life ==
Francesco Paoli was born on 1 September 1642 in Argigliano as the eldest of seven children (three brothers and three sisters) to the peasants Angelo Paoli and Santa Morelli (d. 1654); one brother was Tommaso. His parents named him in honor of Francis of Assisi to whom they had a strong devotion. As a child and adolescent he spent the greater part of his leisure time teaching Catholic doctrine to the poor children of Argigliano. He attended grammar school in Minucciano where his maternal uncle was Father Morelli, the assistant priest.

On 27 November 1660 he was admitted into the Carmelites at the convent of Cerignano in Fivizzano alongside his brother Tommaso. The two brothers returned home for several months before receiving the habit in Fivizzano, and then deciding to go to Siena to the convent of San Nicola for the novitiate (their father escorted them); Paoli assumed the religious name of "Angelo" in honor of his father. He made his vows on 18 December 1661 and then spent a prolonged period doing his philosophical and theological studies in both Pisa – at the convent of Santa Maria del Carmine – and Florence.

He was made a subdeacon on 20 December 1665 and was elevated into the diaconate on 19 December 1666. Paoli was ordained to the priesthood in Florence in 1667 and celebrated there his first Mass on 7 January. He was a sacristan and organist from his ordination until 1674 in Florence but was forced to return home for health reasons. On 15 August 1674 he distributed bread to the poor; it was deemed a miracle that the bread in the basket never depleted. He did not want to be recognized for this so he retreated into the mountains of Garfagana as a hermit, though each dawn he went to the shrine of San Pellegrino to celebrate Mass. In 1674 he was sent to Argigliano and Pistoia and then in 1675 was sent as the Master of Novices to Florence for eighteen months, then transferred to Carniola as a pastor from December 1676 to October 1677; ten months later in 1677 he was sent to Siena. In 1680 he was sent to Montecatini and in 1682 was charged with teaching grammar to novices. Paoli was then appointed to a parish in Pisa for active service in 1682 but was later transferred to Cupoli, Monte Catino and Fivizzano a few months later as an organist and sacristan. He had a special devotion to the Passion and he caused wooden crosses to be erected on the hills around Fivizzano, to bring this devotion to the minds of others to reflect on the love the Redeemer had for mankind. He often said: "Whoever loves God must go to find Him among the poor."

In 1687 the Prior-General Paolo di Sant'Ignazio summoned him to Rome where he arrived on 12 March before being stationed at the church Santi Silvestro e Martino ai Monti; he would remain here for the rest of his life. Paoli arrived with nothing more than his breviary and a small white bag with a little bit of bread. He first passed through his hometown to bid farewell to his aging father and his siblings and then to Siena to bid farewell to his Carmelite friar brother Tommaso. He spent the remainder of his life divided between the care of the sick and the poor in hospitals and then the office of Master of Novices which he held. Paoli approached Pope Clement XI in 1708 and asked him for a restoration of the Coliseum since it should be their task to honor those killed for their faith there and to place wooden crosses there to honor them; Paoli also wanted to convince the pope to halt the pilfering of stone from the Coliseum. The pope was hesitant at first but allowed Paoli to gather volunteers to fix the place and had large wooden crosses placed there, which had been his dream. Paoli managed to do this on Mount Testaccio. He also distinguished himself during two earthquakes at the start of 1703 in aiding the victims that were either displaced or injured. He fed the poor and provided them with blankets and clothes and while visiting hospitals gave them medicine and provided them comfort in their suffering. In 1710 he opened a hospice for the poor of the area.

Paoli received offers from both Pope Innocent XII and from Clement XI to be received into the cardinalate – once for 21 June 1700 – but the friar refused for he feared that he might not be able to spend as much time with the poor. On the offers he said: "It would have been hurtful to the poor whom I would not have been able to help" due to the stringent demands of the cardinalate. He also befriended Cardinal Giuseppe Maria Tomasi who was the Cardinal-Priest of Santi Silvestro e Martino ai Monti.

Paoli was playing the organ on 14 January 1720 when a high fever struck him and confined him to his cell. He died on 20 January 1720 – a Saturday – at 6:45 am and his remains were interred in Santi Silvestro e Martino ai Monti; the pope himself ordered the inscription on the tomb titling Paoli as "venerable" and as the "father of the poor" like others had called him. There were a great number of nobles and common folk in addition to cardinals and those in the episcopate who attended his funeral. Pope Clement XI was pained to learn of Paoli's death and in a letter to the order dubbed Paoli the "father of the poor".

== Beatification ==
The informative phase for the beatification cause opened in Rome in 1723 and concluded sometime later, but also oversaw its business in Florence and in Pescia. The formal introduction to the cause came under Pope Clement XII on 14 July 1739 and Paoli became titled as a Servant of God. At an apostolic process held from 1740 until 1754. Pope Pius VI confirmed that the late friar had lived a model Christian life of heroic virtue and named him as Venerable on 21 January 1781.

The three miracles that would have – in those times centuries back - led to his beatification never received approval so the cause seemed to stall despite even the order's 1908 effort at a General Chapter to revive it. But the impetus needed came in 1927 with the miraculous healing of a woman that was investigated on a diocesan level. That also stalled but was revitalized when the Congregation for the Causes of Saints validated the diocesan process for the miracle on 9 March 2007. Medical experts approved this healing to be a miracle on 29 May 2008, as did theologians on 20 December 2008 and the cardinal and bishop members of the C.C.S. on 26 May 2009. The process culminated on 3 July 2009 when Pope Benedict XVI signed a decree that recognized this 1927 healing was in fact a miracle attributed to Paoli's intercession and thus approved that the late Carmelite friar would be beatified.

The Secretariat of State announced the formal date for the beatification in a 9 January 2010 communique. Archbishop Angelo Amato presided over the beatification on 25 April 2010 in the Basilica di San Giovanni Laterano; the Cardinal Vicar of Rome Agostino Vallini was also in attendance.

The current postulator for this cause is Dr. Giovanna Brizi.
