= Narciso Buffoni =

Italian politician (1952–2025)

President of the Province of Massa-Carrara
- In office 14 October 2014 – 6 June 2016
- Preceded by: Osvaldo Angeli
- Succeeded by: Gianni Lorenzetti

Mayor of Montignoso
- In office 7 July 1993 – 14 May 2001
- Preceded by: Marco Gianfranceschi
- Succeeded by: Federico Binaglia
- In office 16 May 2011 – 6 June 2016
- Preceded by: Federico Binaglia
- Succeeded by: Gianni Lorenzetti

Personal details
- Born: 24 January 1953 Montignoso, Province of Massa-Carrara, Italy
- Died: 24 March 2025 (aged 72)
- Occupation: Physician

Narciso Buffoni (24 January 1953 – 24 March 2025) was an Italian physician and politician who served as president of the Province of Massa-Carrara from 2014 to 2016. A member of the Democratic Party and previously of the Democratic Party of the Left and Democrats of the Left, he served three terms as mayor of Montignoso.

== Life and career ==
Buffoni was born in Montignoso in 1952 and worked as a family doctor and public health officer in the province of Massa-Carrara until January 2021, date of his retirement.

In 1980, he entered the municipal council of his hometown with the Italian Communist Party, joining in 1991 the Democratic Party of the Left. He served as assessor for budget from 1983 to 1989. He was elected mayor in 1993 and re-elected in 1997. He later served as a provincial councillor and as assessor for environment in the Massa-Carrara executive from 2003 to 2008. He became provincial secretary of the Democrats of the Left, a position he held during the party's transition into the Democratic Party in 2007. He returned as mayor of Montignoso in the 2011 local elections, winning 75.05% of the vote.

In October 2014, Buffoni was elected president of the Province of Massa-Carrara in the first election held under the Delrio Law. Running with the centre-left coalition, he received 38,537 weighted votes (70.4%), defeating centre-right candidate Lucia Baracchini, mayor of Pontremoli.

Buffoni died on 24 March 2025, aged 72. The Municipality of Montignoso proclaimed a day of public mourning in his honour.
