= Costantino Cirelli =

Italian politician and partisan (1923–2014)

President of the Province of Massa-Carrara
- In office 1980–1985
- Preceded by: Alessandro Costa

Personal details
- Born: 2 July 1923 Villafranca in Lunigiana, Province of Massa-Carrara, Kingdom of Italy
- Died: 20 September 2014 (aged 91) Filetto, Villafranca in Lunigiana, Tuscany, Italy
- Party: Italian Communist Party

Costantino Cirelli (2 July 1923 – 20 September 2014), also known by his partisan name Raffica, was an Italian politician and resistance fighter during World War II. A member of the Italian Communist Party, he served as president of the Province of Massa-Carrara from 1980 to 1985.

== Life and career ==
Cirelli was born in Villafranca in Lunigiana, in the province of Massa-Carrara, in 1923. During the Italian resistance movement, he fought in several partisan formations in the Lunigiana area adopting the nom de guerre "Raffica". He initially served in the Tosi Brigade, and subsequently joined the Ulivi Brigade under the command of Alessandro "Memo" Brucellaria.

On 17 August, the Ulivi formation attacked a German unit involved in requisitioning livestock at Bardine di San Terenzo, in the municipality of Fivizzano, and 16 German soldiers were killed. The German reprisal resulted in the deaths of 159 civilians in what became known as the San Terenzo Monti massacre. He later fought with the Borrini Brigade.

After the war, Cirelli became a party official of the Italian Communist Party in Lunigiana. He entered local public administration and served as president of the Province of Massa-Carrara from 1980 to 1985. He was named honorary president of the Massa-Carrara branch of the ANPI, the national association representing Italian partisans.

In the 1990s, Cirelli was investigated in connection with the 1945 killing of Giuseppe Lorenzelli, a parish priest in Compione.

Cirelli died in September 2014 at his home in Filetto.
