= Codiponte =

Village in Tuscany, Italy

Coordinates: 44°11′25″N 10°08′57″E

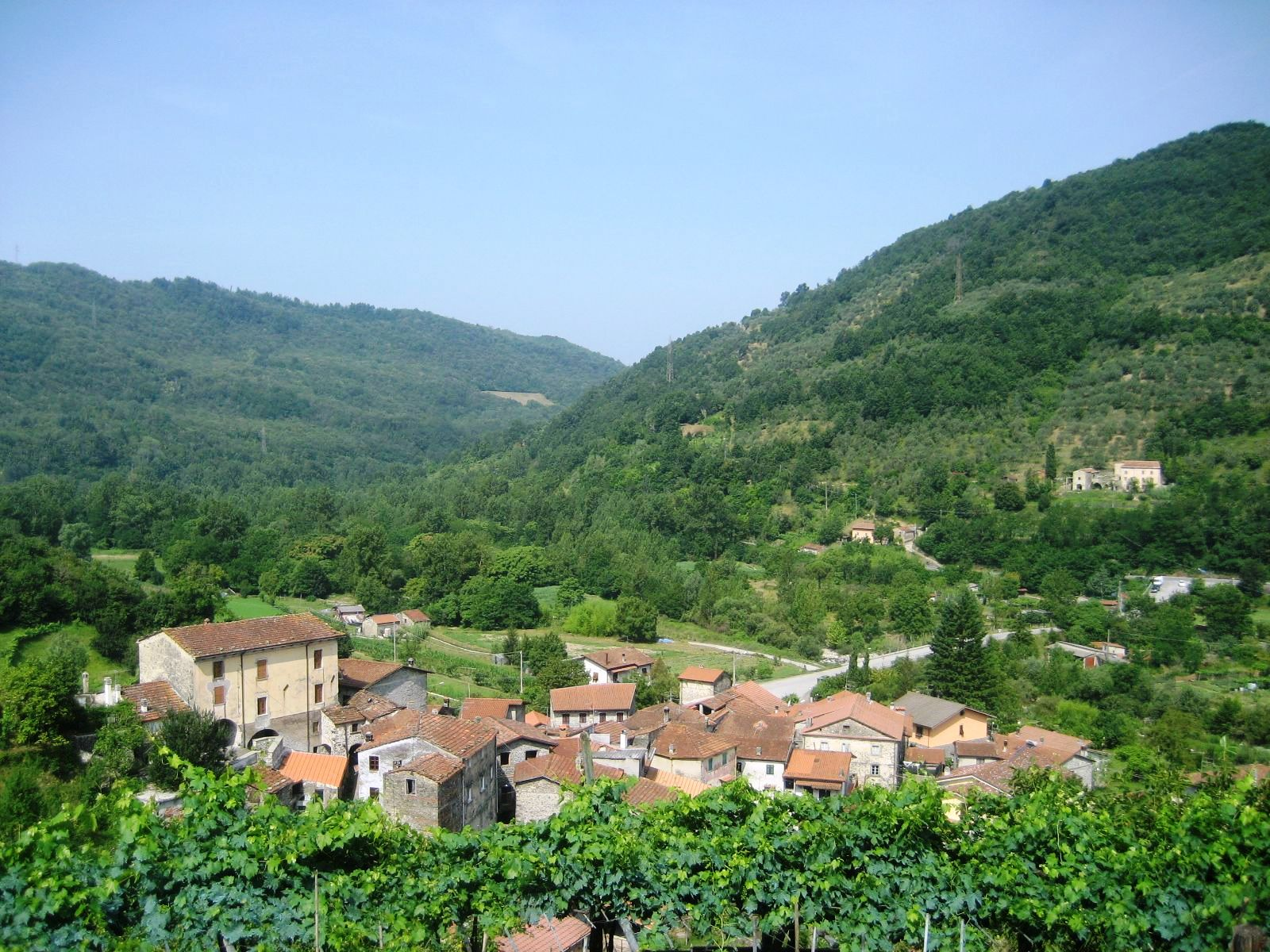
Codiponte.

Codiponte is a village in the municipality of Casola in Lunigiana, Tuscany, Italy. It is located in the Province of Massa and Carrara and is about 20 minutes drive from the comune of Aulla. The population is about 200.

Codiponte lies in the shadow of the Alpi Apuane and in the valley of the River Aullela. It is 255 metres above sea level and has a continental climate with hot summers and cold winters including snowfalls during winter. Summer temperatures are in the high 30°s and winters around 0 °C.

== History ==
Codiponte was once an important stopping place on the Via Francigena for pilgrims travelling to Rome.

Overlooking the village are ruins from the 13th-century "Castile Codiponte" and the "Convent of Clarisse of Santa Maria del Castellaro".

A stone bridge with three arches which was built in 1703 and repaired in 1936. A new bridge 500 metres downstream was built in 1970.

A Roman village is believed to have been located on the northern approach to the bridge near the church.

== Church ==
The village has a 17th-century campanile and the medieval "Pieve dei Santi Cornelio e Cipriano", which is dedicated to the Saints Cornelius and Cyprian. A noticeboard in the church reads:

The Lombard origins of the church are confirmed by the existence of a place-name "Sala", and by a document from 793 which refers to the founding of the church of San Cipriano. The place name "Capite Pontis", the present-day Codiponte, represented a strategic passageway both for the pilgrims who crossed over the Garfagnana on their way from the Lunigiana to Lucca. The first mention of this church dates back to a Deed by Pope Eugenio III in 1148. The actual building with its basilica plan and two apses can be attributed to the twelfth century, though it still maintains several sculptural elements with characteristics reminiscent of the high Middle Ages style.

The church is believed to have been in ruins when it was rebuilt in the Romanesque style in the 12th century and restored after a landslide in the 14th century. The campanile was built in the 17th century. A triptych of the Madonna and Child, Saints Cornelius and Cyprian, and Jesus was made around 1440.

== Grape festival ==
Each year in October, Codiponte residents celebrate La Vendemmia, the grape harvest.

== Gallery ==
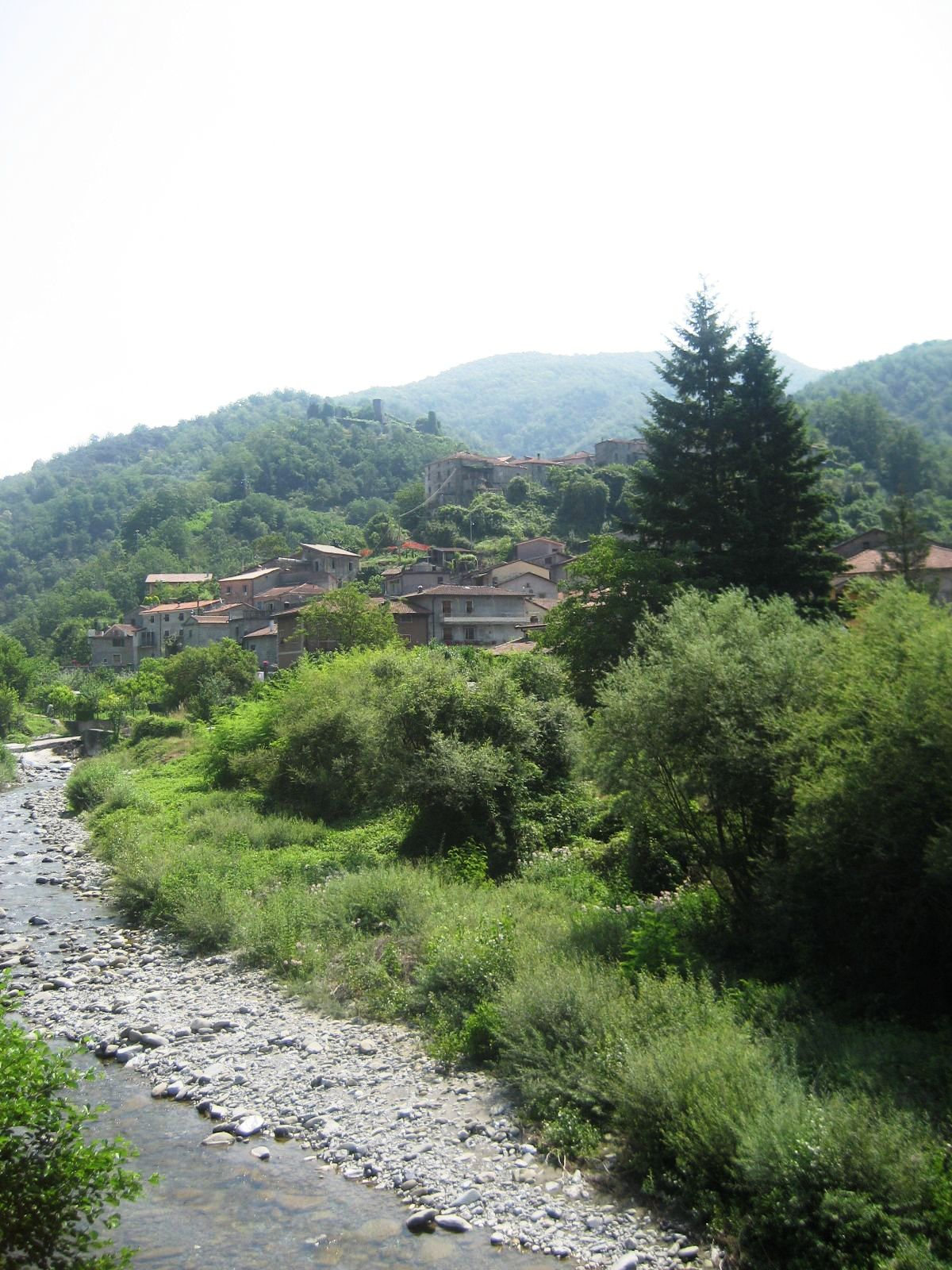
Aullela River at Codiponte

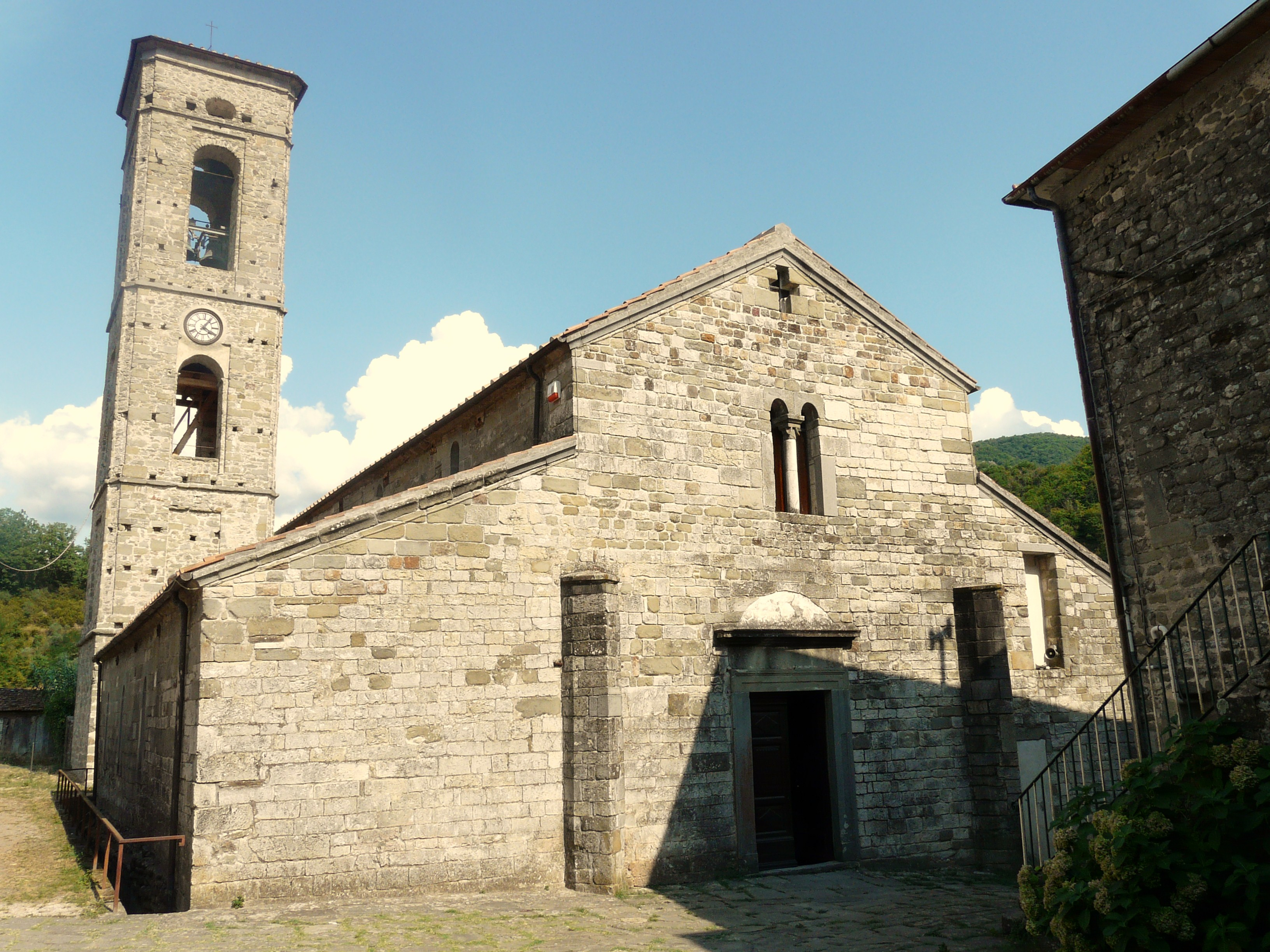
San Cipriano Church and Campanile

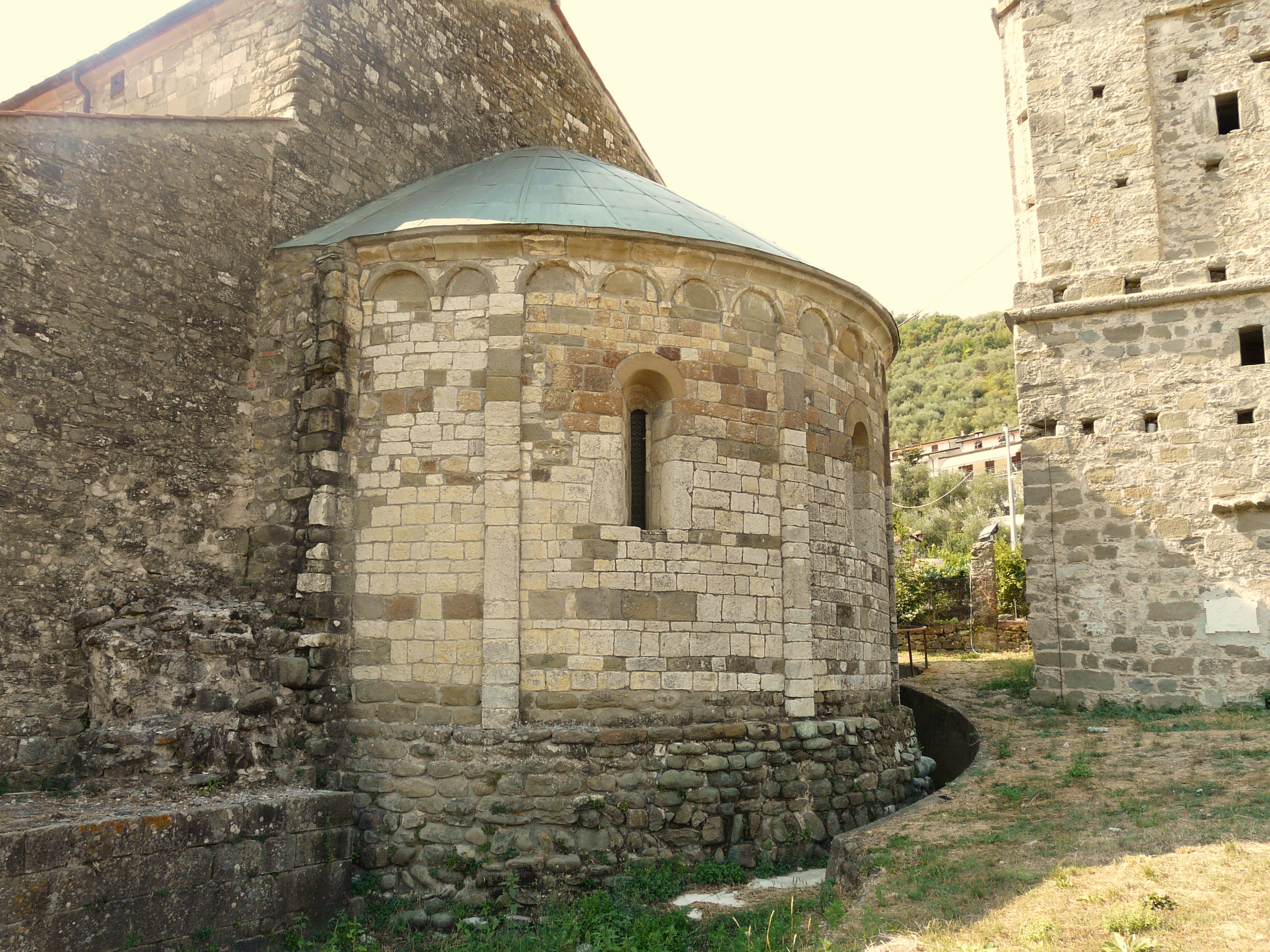
Exterior of church

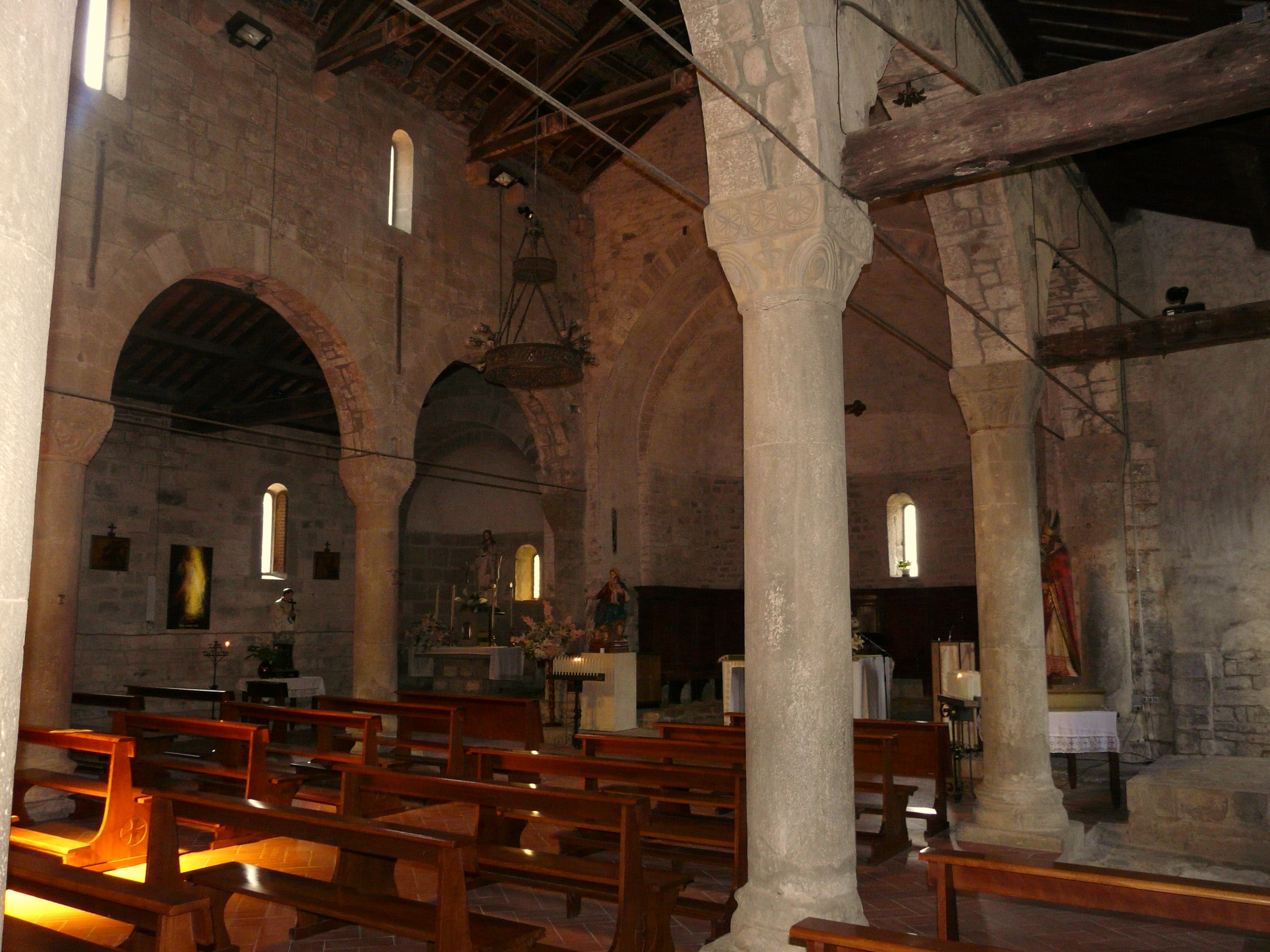
Nave and aisles

== See also ==
- w:it:Pieve dei Santi Cornelio e Cipriano a Codiponte (Italian wikipedia)
