= Gianni Lorenzetti =

Italian politician

Member of the Regional Council of Tuscany
- Incumbent
- Assumed office 29 October 2025

President of the Province of Massa-Carrara
- In office 12 December 2016 – 21 December 2025
- Preceded by: Narciso Buffoni
- Succeeded by: Roberto Valettini

Mayor of Montignoso
- In office 6 June 2016 – 23 December 2025
- Preceded by: Narciso Buffoni
- Succeeded by: Alberto Nardi Perna

Personal details
- Born: 30 August 1967 (age 59) Massa, Italy
- Party: Democratic Party

Gianni Lorenzetti (born 30 August 1967) is an Italian politician who has served as a member of the Regional Council of Tuscany since 2025. He previously served as president of the Province of Massa-Carrara and mayor of Montignoso.

== Life and career ==
Lorenzetti entered politics in Montignoso in 2006, when he was elected to the municipal council for the Democrats of the Left. He was re-elected in 2011 on the Democratic Party list, during which he also served as assessor for public works in the local government.

In June 2016, Lorenzetti was elected mayor of Montignoso as the candidate of the centre-left coalition.

In the 2016 provincial elections, Lorenzetti was elected president of the Province of Massa-Carrara. He was confirmed for a second term in 2021, when he defeated challenger Matteo Mastrini with approximately 56% of the weighted vote.

On 15 March 2022, he was elected president of the Tuscan branch of the Union of Italian Provinces.

Lorenzetti ran as a candidate in the 2025 Tuscan regional election and entered the Regional Council of Tuscany for the Massa-Carrara constituency, receiving 10,862 preference votes. After taking up his regional seat, he resigned as mayor of Montignoso and as president of the province.
