= Giulio Guidoni =

Italian politician (1894–1992)

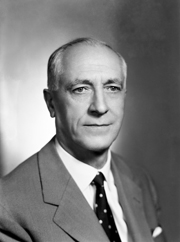

Mayor of Massa
- In office 3 May 1946 – 9 March 1948
- Preceded by: Gino Grassi
- Succeeded by: Gino Cecchieri

President of the Province of Massa-Carrara
- In office 1951–1958

Member of the Senate
- In office 12 June 1958 – 15 May 1963

Personal details
- Born: 5 July 1894 Massa, Tuscany, Italy
- Died: 6 June 1992 (aged 97) Massa, Tuscany, Italy
- Party: Christian Democracy

Giulio Guidoni (5 July 1894 – 6 June 1992) was an Italian politician who served as mayor of Massa (1946–1948), president of the Province of Massa-Carrara (1951–1958), and Senator of the Republic (1958–1963).

== Bibliography ==
- Giulio Guidoni un esempio di vita a servizio del popolo apuano. Massa: Centro studi Alcide De Gasperi. 2002.
- Liliano Mandorli (1 March 2009). "Guidoni il "lungimirante"". Toscana Oggi.

Political offices
Preceded by Gino Grassi	Mayor of Massa; 1946-1948	Succeeded by Gino Cecchieri
