= Franco Gussoni =

Italian politician (1949–2018)

President of the Province of Massa-Carrara
- In office 7 December 1994 – 27 May 2003
- Preceded by: Amedeo Boiardi
- Succeeded by: Osvaldo Angeli

Mayor of Pontremoli
- In office 29 May 2007 – 1 February 2011
- Preceded by: Marino Bertocchi
- Succeeded by: Lucia Baracchini

Personal details
- Born: 3 December 1949 Pontremoli, Province of Massa-Carrara, Italy
- Died: 5 August 2018 (aged 68) Massa, Tuscany, Italy
- Party: Christian Democracy; Italian People's Party; The Daisy; Democratic Party
- Profession: Teacher

Franco Gussoni (3 December 1949 – 5 August 2018) was an Italian politician who served as president of the Province of Massa-Carrara from 1994 to 2003.

A member of Christian Democracy (DC), he served as a municipal councillor in Pontremoli from the 1980s. Following the dissolution of the DC, he joined the Italian People's Party. In 1994, Gussoni was elected president of the Province of Massa-Carrara after defeating Enrico Ferri in the runoff. He was re-elected in 1998, winning 61% in the first round as the candidate of the centre-left coalition. After leaving the provincial presidency in 2003, Gussoni served as a provincial assessor for public works in the government of his successor Osvaldo Angeli until 2006. He joined the Democratic Party in 2007 and was elected mayor of Pontremoli that year, serving until 2011.

Gussoni died in Massa on 5 August 2018, aged 68.
