= Ermanno Di Casale =

Italian politician (1926–2010)

President of the Province of Massa-Carrara
- In office 4 March 1987 – 8 August 1990
- Succeeded by: Amedeo Boiardi

Mayor of Fosdinovo
- In office 30 June 1990 – 15 November 1993

Personal details
- Born: 21 February 1926 Fosdinovo, Province of Massa-Carra, Kingdom of Italy
- Died: 31 October 2010 (aged 84)
- Party: Italian Socialist Party

Ermanno Di Casale (21 February 1926 – 31 October 2010) was an Italian politician of the Italian Socialist Party who served as president of the Province of Massa-Carrara from 1987 to 1990.

== Life and career ==
Di Casale was born in 1926. During World War II, he was caught prisoner by the Nazis and deported to Germany.

He was active in politics since the 1960s and served several terms as mayor of Fosdinovo. In March 1987, he became president of the Province of Massa-Carrara, heading a coalition government comprising the Socialists, Communists, Republicans and Socialdemocrats, following the collapse of a previous administration that included the Christian Democracy formed after the 1985 provincial election.

He served once again as mayor of Fosdinovo from 1990 to 1993 and remained involved in the Socialist Party after retiring from public office.

Di Casale died on 31 October 2010, aged 84.
