= Orto Botanico dei Frignoli =

Botanical garden in Italy

Coordinates: 44°14′N 10°08′E

The Orto Botanico dei Frignoli (7 hectares) is a botanical garden located at 900 metres elevation on SS63 del Passo del Cerreto, Fivizzano, Province of Massa-Carrara, Italy. It is open daily in the warmer months; an admission fee is charged.

The garden was originally established in 1932 as a nursery of the Corpo Forestale dello Stato (State Forestry Corps). In 1990 it became a provincial botanical garden with help from Comunità Montana and the Museo di Storia Naturale della Lunigiana. Today the garden includes an arboretum containing about one hundred species of woody plants from the Apuan Alps, Apennine Mountains, and Mediterranean regions. Its plantings reproduce various mountain environments, as well as local food plants and natural areas.

== See also ==
- List of botanical gardens in Italy
