= Silvio Balderi =

Italian politician (1923–2017)

President of the Province of Massa-Carrara
- In office 1970–1975
- Preceded by: Carlo Malatesta
- Succeeded by: Alessandro Costa

Mayor of Massa
- In office 23 January 1963 – 3 January 1968
- Preceded by: Renato Argini
- Succeeded by: Ennio Fialdini

Personal details
- Born: 2 July 1923 Massa, Kingdom of Italy
- Died: 19 May 2017 (aged 93) Massa, Italy
- Party: Christian Democracy

Silvio Balderi (2 July 1923 – 19 May 2017) was an Italian politician of the Christian Democracy party. He served as mayor of Massa from 1963 to 1968 and as president of the Province of Massa-Carrara from 1970 to 1975.

== Life and career ==
Balderi joined the Italian Republican Party at a young age before later becoming a member of Christian Democracy, in which he held leadership positions in Massa. During the Italian Resistance, he was arrested and deported to Germany by Nazi authorities. He graduated in law in 1949.

In January 1963, Balderi was elected mayor of Massa and was re-elected in 1966, remaining in office until 1968. He later served as president of the Province of Massa-Carrara from 1970 to 1975.

Balderi died in Massa on 19 May 2017 at the age of 93.
