= Tommaso Puccini =

Italian gallery director (1749–1811)

Tommaso Puccini (5 April 1749 - 14 March 1811) was an Italian gallery director, heading the Gallerie fiorentine and the Accademia di Belle Arti in Florence as well as acting as Superintendent of Fine Arts. He was a prolific writer on art history and art theory.

== Life ==
=== Youth ===
Born in Pistoia, he first studied at the town's Collegio Forteguerri before moving on to the University of Pisa, where he studied jurisprudence under professor Giuseppe Paribeni, also from Pistoia. He proved more suited to studying classic Italian literature, principally Dante, and fine arts. After graduating he went to Rome, where he studied paintings, sculptures, prints and monuments and talked with artists.

=== Florence ===
Ferdinand III, Grand Duke of Tuscany summoned him to Florence to head the Gallerie fiorentine. He took office in the 1770s and added captions with the artist, title and date to each work in the Uffizi. He was an extraordinary functionary of the grand-ducal court, acting as director of the Uffizi, secretary to the Accademia di Belle Arti and display consultant to the Medici's palazzi and villas. He also befriended Antonio Canova, Raffaello Sanzio Morghen, Francesco Bartolozzi, Vittorio Alfieri, Domenico Monti, Giovanni Fantoni, Ugo Foscolo and Giovanni Battista Zannoni.

During the French occupation of Florence in 1799 he became a major figure in saving the museum's artworks from seizure by the occupiers, ensuring the Uffizi lost no major works other than the Medici Venus. Between June and October 1800, fearing French troops would return to Florence, he decided to move the Uffizi artworks to safety. On 14 October 1800, after the defeat of the "Royal Grand Ducal Regency", Puccini set off from Livorno for Palermo with 75 crates containing the best statues and paintings from the Uffizi and Palazzo Pitti collection. In 1803, after the end of the second French occupation and Charles Louis Bourbon's arrival in Tuscany to be the first ruler of the new Kingdom of Etruria, the artworks were returned to Florence and Puccini resumed his role as director.

=== Last years ===
He also began to write essays, his first being ”Esame critico dell'opera sulla pittura di Daniele Webb” ("Critical examination of work about painting by Daniel Webb"). He also wrote on literature, his best work in that area being his translation of Catullus. He died in Florence - Giovanni Battista Zannoni wrote a funerary elegy, a solemn funeral for him was arranged by the Accademia Pistoiese (to which Puccini had presented his “Sullo Stato delle belle arti in Toscana”) and Tommaso's nephew Niccolò Puccini had a memorial erected to him in the gardens of Villa Puccini di Scornio with an inscription by Pietro Contrucci.
