= List of presidents of the Province of Massa-Carrara =

President of the Province of Massa-Carrara
- Presidente della Provincia di Massa-Carrara
- Incumbent; Roberto Valettini since 21 December 2025
- Residence: Ducal Palace, Massa
- Term length: 4 years
- Inaugural holder: Cesare Betti
- Formation: 1889

The president of the Province of Massa-Carrara is the head of the provincial government in Massa-Carrara, Tuscany, Italy. The president oversees the administration of the province, coordinates the activities of the municipalities, and represents the province in regional and national matters. The provincial headquarters is located at the Ducal Palace in Massa.

Since December 2025, the office has been held by Roberto Valettini, an independent politician.

== List ==
=== Presidents of the Provincial Deputation (1889–1926) ===
No.	Portrait	Name	Term of office		Party
No.	Portrait	Name	Start	End	Party
1		Cesare Betti	1889	1902	
2		Silvio Pellerano	1902	1904	
3		Ferdinando Quartieri	1905	1907	
4		Battista Cavagnada	1907	1908	
5		Giuseppe Tedeschi	1908	?	
		Eumene Fontana	?	1922	
		Umberto Ascoli	1923	?	

=== Presidents of the Provincial Rectorate (1927–1944) ===
No.	Portrait	Name	Term of office		Party
No.	Portrait	Name	Start	End	Party
		Augusto Dovati	?	20 July 1933	National Fascist Party
		Mario Margara	20 July 1933	1943	National Fascist Party

=== Presidents of the Province (since 1951) ===
No.	Portrait	Name	Term of office		Party
No.	Portrait	Name	Start	End	Party
1		Giulio Guidoni	1951	1956	Christian Democracy
		?	?	?	?
		Adamo Giuseppe Galeazzi	1963	1965	Christian Democracy
		Carlo Malatesta	1965	1970	Christian Democracy
		Silvio Balderi	1970	1975	Christian Democracy
		Alessandro Costa	1975	1980	Italian Communist Party
		Costantino Cirelli	1980	1985	Italian Communist Party
		Ermanno Di Casale	4 March 1987	8 August 1990	Italian Socialist Party
		Amedeo Boiardi	8 August 1990	30 April 1994	Italian Socialist Party
		Franco Gussoni	7 December 1994	30 November 1998	Italian People's Party
		Franco Gussoni	30 November 1998	27 May 2003	Italian People's Party
		Osvaldo Angeli	27 May 2003	29 April 2008	Democrats of the Left; Democratic Party
		Osvaldo Angeli	29 April 2008	30 April 2013	Democrats of the Left; Democratic Party
–		Osvaldo Angeli	30 April 2013	14 October 2014	Special Commissioner
		Narciso Buffoni	14 October 2014	6 June 2016	Democratic Party
–		Ugo Malatesta (Acting vice president)	6 June 2016	12 December 2016	Democratic Party
		Gianni Lorenzetti	12 December 2016	18 December 2021	Democratic Party
		Gianni Lorenzetti	18 December 2021	21 December 2025	Democratic Party
		Roberto Valettini	21 December 2025	Incumbent	Independent

== Sources ==
- Menichini, Piera (2005). "I presidenti delle Province dall'Unità alla Grande guerra: repertorio analitico". Storia Amministrazione Costituzione (13): 262–263.
- "Storia amministrativa dell'ente". Ministero dell'Interno.
