= Abbey of San Caprasio, Aulla =

Church building in Aulla, Italy

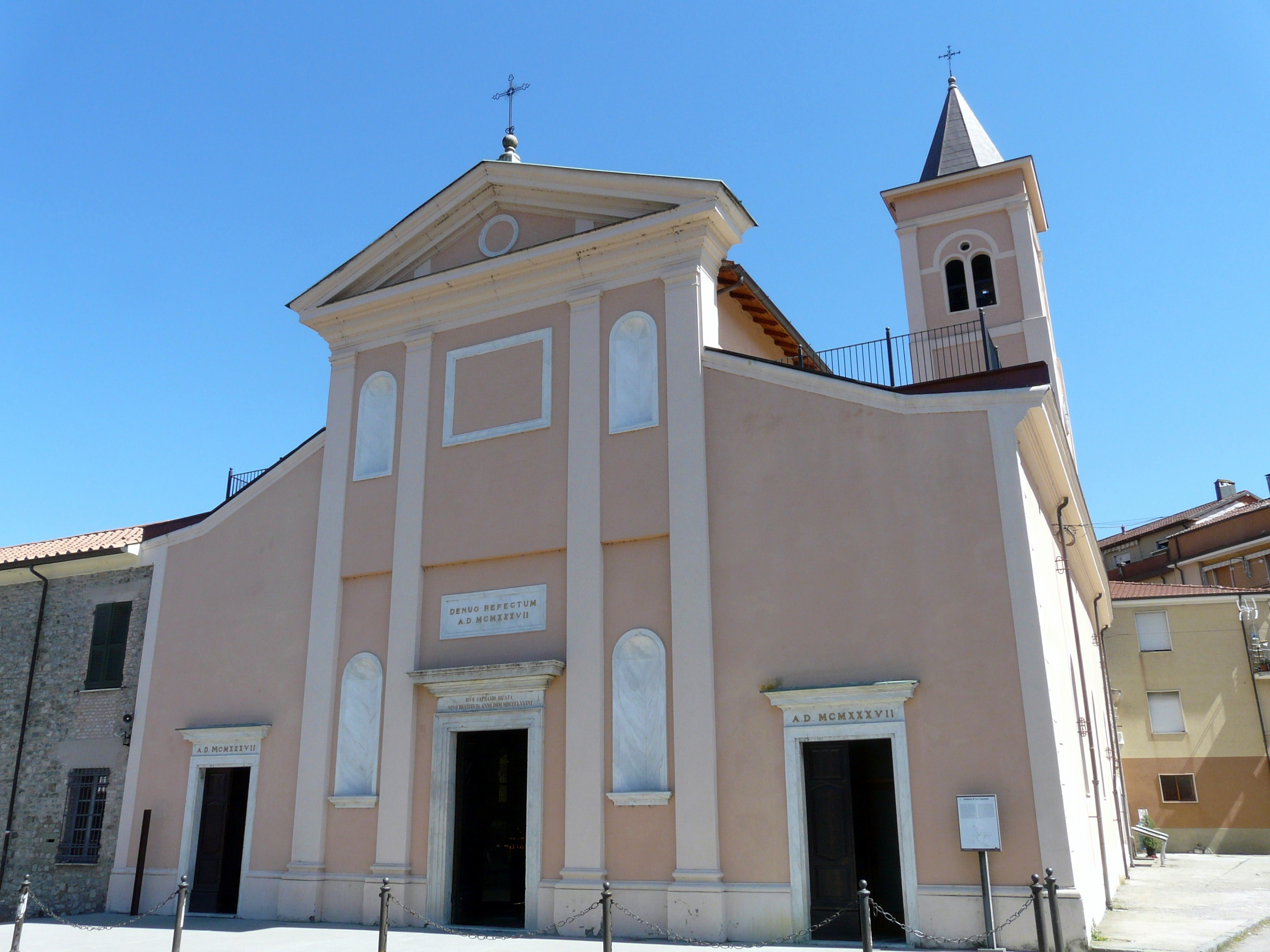

The Abbey of San Caprasio in Aulla, province of Massa-Carrara, region of Tuscany, Italy, is a former Benedictine monastery, established as a hostel on the pilgrimage route to Rome. It was originally dedicated to the Virgin Mary (Santa Maria), but in 1077 was re-dedicated to Saint Caprasius of Lérins (San Caprasio), the patron saint of the town and a patron saint of pilgrims.

The abbey was founded in 884 within a fortification held by Adalbert I, Margrave of Tuscany. It later was linked to the Malaspina family and also contested by the Vescovi Conti of Luni. It was powerful by the early 13th century, owning various parishes and land in the area.

The monastery was suppressed at the end of the 18th century during the Napoleonic occupation, but the church remains. It was reconstructed in 1070 on the present layout, but has undergone many further reconstructions over the centuries. It now serves as a museum and a hostel affiliated with the local parish. Although it is deconsecrated, it houses the relics of Saint Caprasius, which were discovered during archaeological investigations in 2003.
