= Monte Sillara =

Mountain in Italy

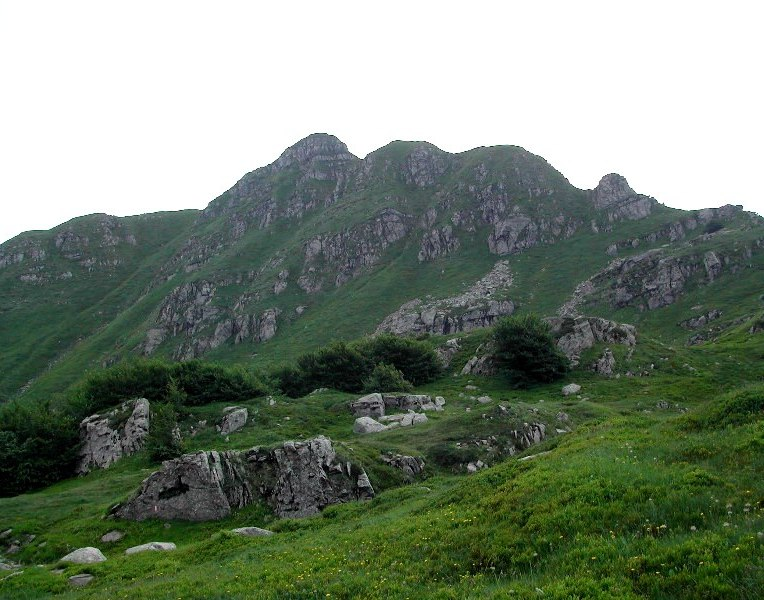
- Monte Terricella in the Sillara's northern area

Highest point
- Elevation: 1,861 m (6,106 ft)
- Prominence: 663 m (2,175 ft)
- Isolation: 10.83 km (6.73 mi)
- Coordinates: 44°22′07″N 10°03′50″E

Geography
- Location within Italy
- Location: Emilia-Romagna, Tuscany, Italy
- Parent range: Tuscan-Emilian Apennines

Monte Sillara is the highest peak in the Appennino Parmense, a sub-chain of the northern Apennines (Appennino Tosco-Emilano) in the province of Parma, northern Italy. It has an altitude of 1,861 m. The Sillara is located at the boundary of the provinces of Parma and Massa-Carrara, divided between the comuni of Monchio delle Corti (northern slopes) and Bagnone (southern ones).

On the Parmense side are two small glacial lakes, the Lake Sillara Superiore (11,400 sq. m, at 1,732 m) and the Lake Sillara Inferiore (11,350 sq. m, at 1,731 m). The source of the Bagnone torrent, a left affluence of the Magra River, can be found on the southern Sillara.

== View from Monte Sillara ==
In excellent conditions, it is possible to see the Wallisian Alps (distance ≈ 250 to 270 km) and the Bern Alps (distance ≈ 285 km) in northwest and the Bernina Group (≈ 225 km) in the north. In the south-southwest you can see the mountains of the Corsica Island (for instance Monte Cinto / 2706 m in ≈ 220 to 260 kilometres).

== See also ==
- Lake Verde (Parma)
