= Roberto Valettini =

Italian politician (born 1951)

President of the Province of Massa-Carrara
- Incumbent
- Assumed office 20 December 2025
- Preceded by: Gianni Lorenzetti

Mayor of Aulla
- Incumbent
- Assumed office 12 June 2017
- Preceded by: Silvia Magnani

Personal details
- Born: 21 September 1951 (age 75) Campiglia Marittima, Province of Livorno, Italy
- Party: Christian Democracy; Democratic Party (until 2025)
- Education: University of Pisa
- Occupation: Lawyer

Roberto Valettini (born 21 September 1951) is an Italian politician who has served as president of the Province of Massa-Carrara since 2025 and as mayor of Aulla since 2017.

== Life and career ==
Vallettini was born in 1951 in Campiglia Marittima, in the province of Livorno. He graduated in law from the University of Pisa, and subsequently obtained a two-year postgraduate specialisation in business and labour law from the University of Parma and a yearly master certification in tax law from the University of Bologna. He began practicing as a lawyer in 1981. He also taught as a contract professor at the University of Florence, where he lectured in European social legislation and social security law between 2002 and 2011.

Valentini entered politics in the 1980s, when he was elected to the municipal council of Aulla for the Christian Democracy. He was elected mayor of Aulla in the 2017 local elections with 33.04% of the vote, standing for the centre-left civic list Aulla nel cuore. From June 2019 to December 2021, he served as president of the Lunigiana Mountain Municipal Union, having been elected unanimously by the mayors of the member municipalities. He was re-elected mayor of Aulla in 2022.

In 2025, he broke with the Democratic Party (PD) over the election for president of the Province of Massa-Carrara. After the PD backed Gianluigi Giannetti, mayor of Fivizzano, Valettini presented an alternative candidacy supported by the centre-right. The PD's provincial commission subsequently suspended him from the party over his decision to run against its official candidate. He ultimately won against Giannetti, receiving 49,708 weighted votes (50.94%). Following his election, Valettini described the result as the product of a broad and cross-party alliance involving civic groups, Action, dissident sections of the PD and the centre-right. He also described himself as a "democratic Catholic" open to dialogue and reaffirmed his opposition to fascism, citing his membership in the ANPI and Azione Cattolica.

In April 2026, Valettini opposed the proposed construction of a Repatriation Detention Centre (CPR) in Aulla, arguing that such centres were illegitimate and that Aulla was unsuitable because of its high population density. As provincial president, however, he had abstained from a centre-left motion opposing CPRs generally, while voting in favour of a centre-right motion opposing their construction specifically in the province. Valettini explained that the provincial motion was outside the province's remit because it opposed CPRs outside Massa-Carrara, while stating that he opposed a CPR in his own province. Il Fatto Quotidiano described Valettini as a political "equilibrist" ("equilibrista").
