= Ferdinando Quartieri =

Italian industrialist and politician (1865–1936)

Senator of the Kingdom of Italy
- In office 8 June 1921 – 31 March 1936

Personal details
- Born: 6 January 1865 Bagnone, Province of Massa-Carrara, Kingdom of Italy
- Died: 31 March 1936 (aged 71) Milan, Kingdom of Italy
- Occupation: Industrialist

Ferdinando Quartieri (6 January 1865 – 31 March 1936) was an Italian industrialist and politician. He was a leading figure in the Italian chemical and explosives industry.

== Life and career ==
Born in Bagnone, in the province of Massa-Carrara, Quartieri was the son of the politician Nicola. He graduated in chemical engineering and became managing director and later president of the Società Italiana Prodotti Esplodenti (SIPE), one of Italy's principal explosives manufacturers. He was appointed a senator of the Kingdom of Italy in 1921 and participated in several international commissions and diplomatic missions during the post-First World War period. He also served as president of the Province of Massa-Carrara.
