= Alessandro Costa =

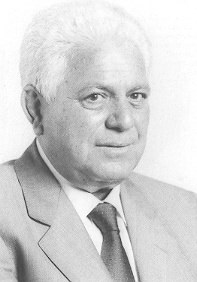

Member of the Chamber of Deputies
- In office 2 July 1987 – 2 April 1992

Mayor of Carrara
- In office 9 August 1980 – 11 May 1987
- Preceded by: Sebastiano Puccinelli
- Succeeded by: Fausto Marchetti

President of the Province of Massa-Carrara
- In office 1975–1980
- Preceded by: Silvio Balderi
- Succeeded by: Costantino Cirelli

Personal details
- Born: 6 February 1929 Carrara, Kingdom of Italy
- Died: 6 June 1992 (aged 63)
- Party: Italian Communist Party (until 1991); Democratic Party of the Left (1991–1992)

Alessandro Costa (6 February 1929 – 6 June 1992) was an Italian politician from Carrara who served on the Chamber of Deputies from 2 July 1987 to 22 April 1992. He was affiliated with the Italian Communist Party and the Democratic Party of the Left.
