= Lérins =

Lérins may refer to:

== People ==
- Caprasius of Lérins (died 430), a hermit who lived in Lérins, Provence
- Vincent of Lérins (died 440s), a Gallic monk and author of early Christian writings
- Antony of Lerins (ca. 468–ca. 520), a Christian saint

== Places ==
- Lérins Abbey, a Cistercian monastery on the island of Saint-Honorat, one of the Lérins Islands, on the French Riviera
- Lérins Islands, a group of four Mediterranean islands off the French Riviera, in Cannes
