= Monchio delle Corti =

- Comune
- Comune di Monchio delle Corti
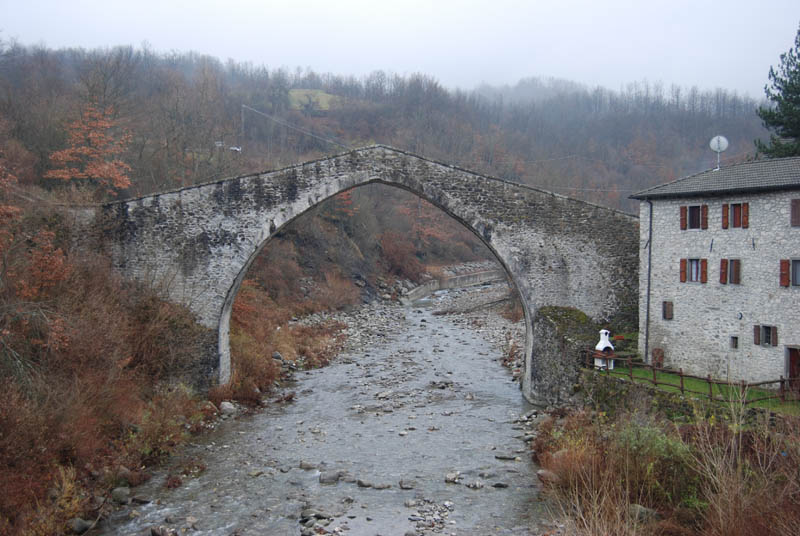
- The old bridge in Ponte Lugagnano, Monchio delle Corti

- Coat of arms

- Location within Italy Location within Emilia-Romagna
- Coordinates: 44°25′N 10°7′E
- Country: Italy
- Region: Emilia-Romagna
- Province: Parma (PR)
- Frazioni: Aneta, Antria, Bastia, Casarola, Ceda, Cozzanello, Lugagnano Inferiore, Lugagnano Superiore, Monchio Basso, Montale, Pianadetto, Ponte Lugagnano, Prato, Riana, Rigoso, Rimagna, Ticchiano, Trecoste, Trefiumi, Trincera, Valditacca, Vecciatica

Government
  - Mayor: Claudio Moretti

Area
  - Total: 69.04 km^{2} (26.66 sq mi)
- Elevation: 820 m (2,690 ft)

Population (31 October 2017)
  - Total: 901
  - Density: 13.1/km^{2} (33.8/sq mi)
- Demonym: Monchiesi
- Time zone: UTC+1 (CET)
  - Summer (DST): UTC+2 (CEST)
- Postal code: 43010
- Dialing code: 0521
- Website: Official website

Monchio delle Corti (Parmigiano: Monc') is a comune (municipality) in the Province of Parma in the Italian region Emilia-Romagna, located about 100 kilometres (62 mi) west of Bologna and about 45 kilometres (28 mi) southwest of Parma, including part of the Appennino Parmense. The Monte Sillara, at 1,861 metres (6,106 ft), is the highest peak in the province.

Sights include the medieval church of Sts. Lawrence and Michael, reconsecrated in 1536.

== See also ==
- Lake Verde (Parma)
