= Lake Verde (Parma) =

Glacial lake in Emilia-Romagna, Italy

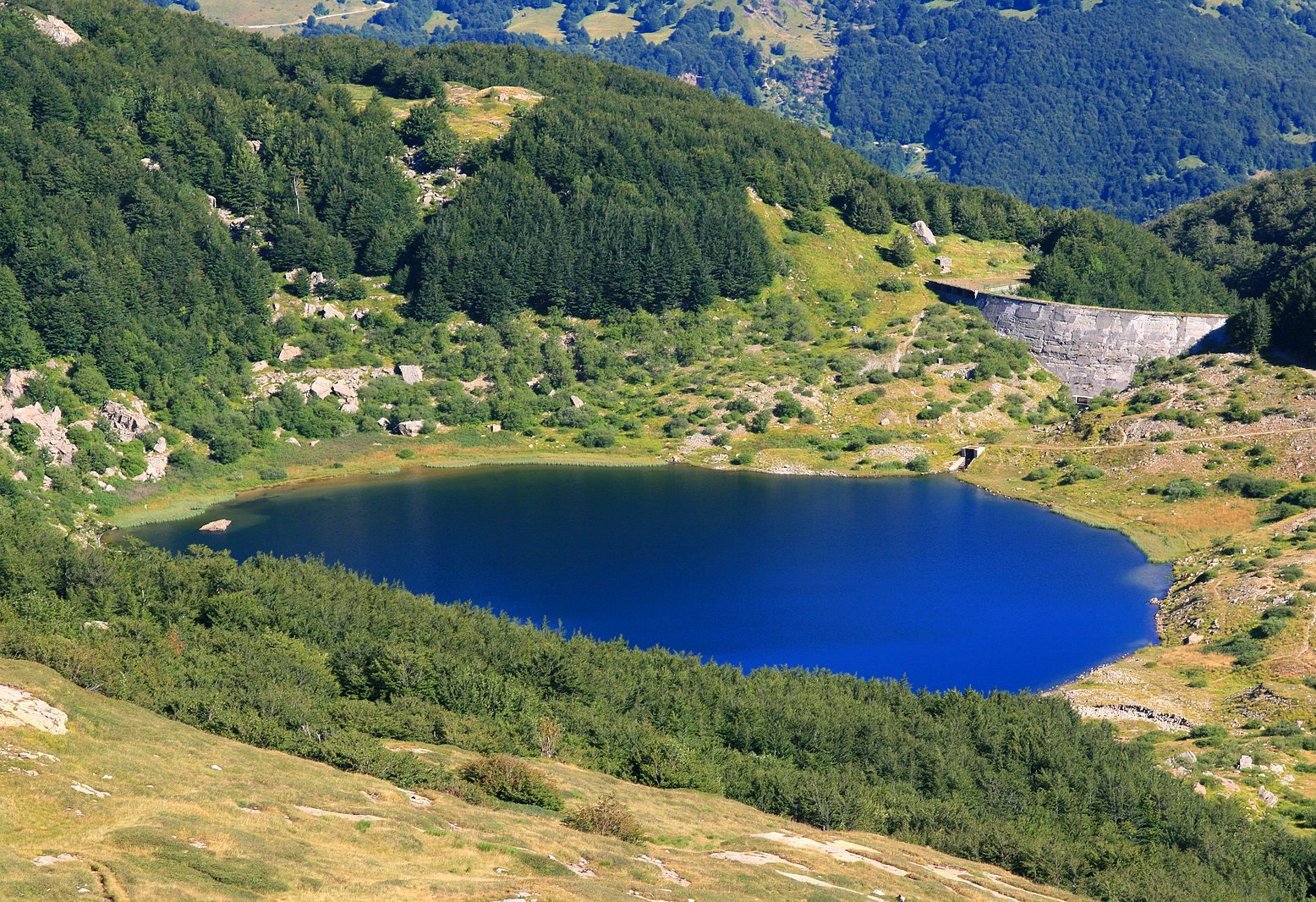
- Lake Verde in the Province of Parma
- Interactive map of Lake Verde
- Location: Monchio delle Corti, Province of Parma, Emilia-Romagna, Italy
- Coordinates: 44.3622°N 10.0902°E
- Type: Glacial
- Basin countries: Italy
- Surface area: 0.059 km^{2} (0.023 sq mi)
- Max. depth: 24 m (79 ft)
- Surface elevation: 1,507 m (4,944 ft)
- Frozen: Late November to mid-April

The Lake Verde is a lake of glacial origin in the Parma Apennines, in the municipality of Monchio delle Corti. It is the deepest lake and the third largest (after Lake Santo and Lake Ballano) in the Province of Parma.

== Characteristics ==
The lake is located within the Parco regionale delle Valli del Cedra e del Parma, a few kilometers from the border between Emilia-Romagna and Tuscany. It is situated about 4 km southeast of Monte Sillara (1,861 m) and about 1 km southwest of Lago Ballano, from which it is separated by a rocky ridge. Both Lake Verde and Lake Ballano are part of the catchment basin of the Cedra, a left tributary of the Enza.

The lake is located at an altitude of 1,507 meters a.s.l., has a maximum depth of 24 meters, and a surface area of approximately 5.90 ha. The area and depth of high-altitude lakes are variable depending on atmospheric precipitation (rain or snow), snowmelt, and evaporation due to solar radiation. The values provided are therefore subject to variations.

As with all lakes located at high altitudes, the lake's surface is frozen and covered with snow during the winter period, sometimes from mid-November to late April.

== Fauna and fishing ==
Due to its considerable depth, Lake Verde is an ideal environment for the brown trout, with specimens even of large sizes. Sport fishing is authorized only with possession of a standard fishing license and a permit issued by the Municipality of Monchio delle Corti.

== Dam data ==
- Start of works: 1962
- Completion of works: 1970
- Dam type: Gravity, rockfill with metal sealing layer
- Height from the riverbed: 86.5 m
- Height above foundation level: 42 m
- Height from foundation point: 52.7 m
- Crest length: 423 m
- Dam volume: 890,000 m^{3}
- Maximum reservoir level: 2,529 m a.s.l.
- Reservoir capacity: 7.20 × 10^{6} m^{3}
- Catchment area: 13.50 km^{2}

== Dam ==
Near the lake, there is a dam, built in 1909 and later renovated, which, together with the one at Lake Ballano, was used to supply the hydroelectric power plant in Rigoso. The Lake Verde dam has been out of service since 1964 due to static sealing issues, while the Lake Ballano dam is still operational and solely supplies the power plant. Both dams are currently managed by the company Enel Green Power.

In 2008, Enel approved a preliminary project for the partial reconstruction of both dams, but as of August 2013, the construction sites had not yet been opened. It is not known if or when the works will be carried out.
