= Alberto Del Nero =

Italian politician (1918–1986)

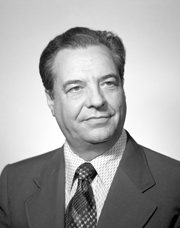

Mayor of Massa
- In office 2 December 1958 – 5 December 1962
- Preceded by: Gino Cecchieri
- Succeeded by: Renato Argini

Member of the Senate
- In office 5 June 1968 – 11 July 1983

Personal details
- Born: 3 July 1918 Massa, Tuscany, Italy
- Died: 12 December 1986 (aged 68)
- Party: Christian Democracy

Alberto Del Nero (3 July 1918 – 12 December 1986) was an Italian politician who served as Mayor of Massa (1958–1962), Senator (1968–1983) and Undersecretary of State in four cabinets (1972–1976).

Political offices
Preceded by Gino Cecchieri	Mayor of Massa; 1958-1962	Succeeded by Renato Argini
