= Bagnone =

- Comune
- Comune di Bagnone
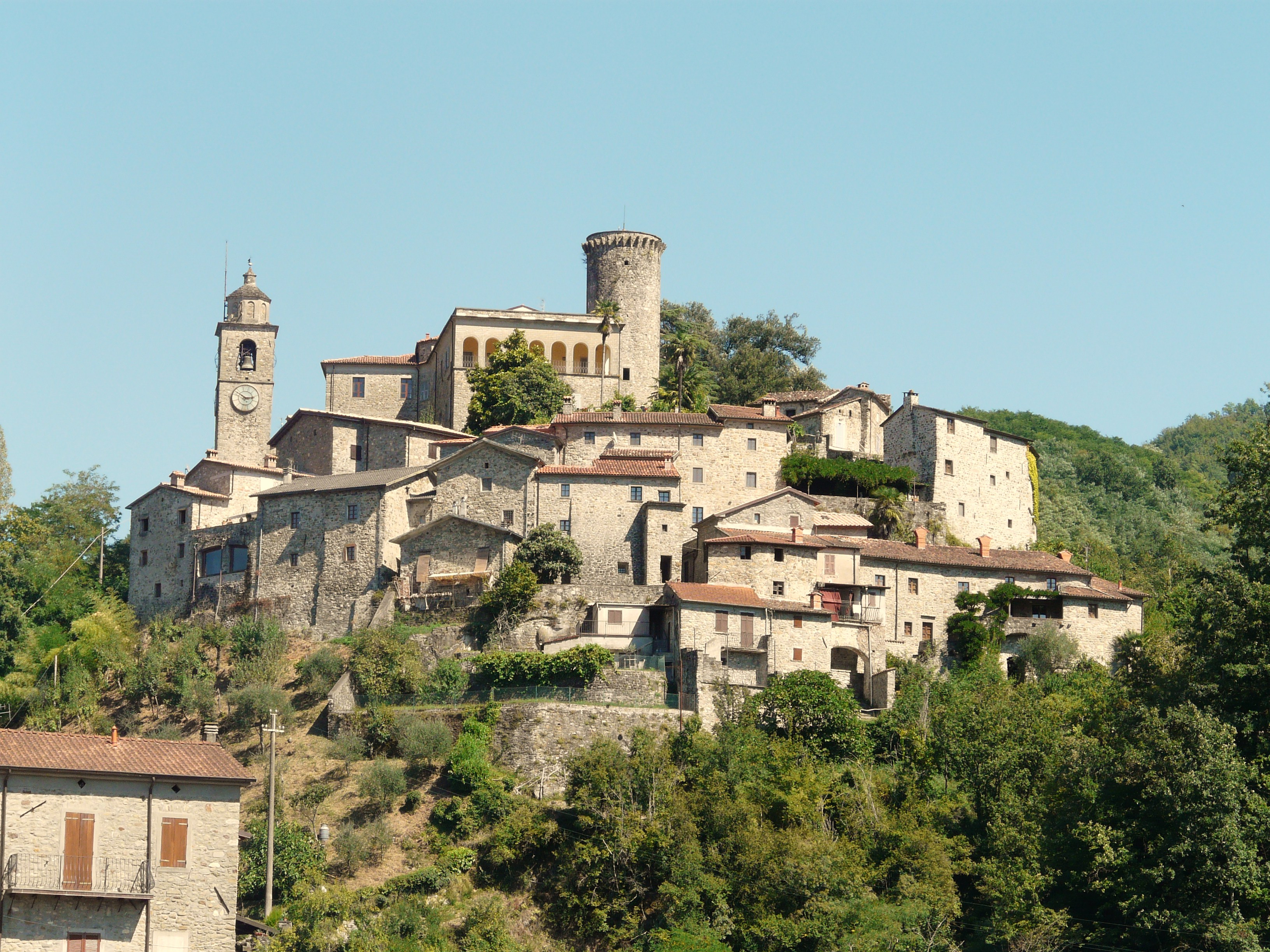

- Location within Italy Location within Tuscany
- Coordinates: 44°18′55″N 9°59′44″E
- Country: Italy
- Region: Tuscany
- Province: Massa and Carrara (MS)
- Frazioni: Biglio, Canale, Canneto, Castiglione del Terziere, Collesino, Compione, Corlaga, Corvarola, Darbia, Gabbiana, Groppo, Iera, Lusana, Mochignano, Nola, Orturano, Pastina, Pieve, Treschietto, Vico, Vico Canneto, Vico Chiesa, Vico Monterole, Vico Valle

Government
  - Mayor: Carletto Marconi

Area
  - Total: 73.8 km^{2} (28.5 sq mi)

Population (31 August 2017)
  - Total: 1,845
  - Density: 25.0/km^{2} (64.7/sq mi)
- Time zone: UTC+1 (CET)
  - Summer (DST): UTC+2 (CEST)
- Postal code: 54021
- Dialing code: 0187
- Website: Official website

Bagnone is a comune (municipality) in the Province of Massa and Carrara in the Italian region Tuscany, located about 120 kilometres (75 mi) northwest of Florence and about 35 kilometres (22 mi) northwest of Massa in the Lunigiana, facing the Monte Sillara, which has a peak elevation of 1,861 metres (6,106 ft). The Bagnone torrent crosses the Communal territory, a left affluence of the Magra River.

Sights include the castle, the churches of San Niccolò (rebuilt in the 18th century, including a 15th-century Madonna del Pianto from the medieval edifice) and San Leonardo (1785) and the oratory of San Terenzio (housing 17th-century paintings).

On 22 August 2009, a lottery player from Bagnone won an estimated €146.9 million (£128 million / US$211 million) in Italy's SuperEnalotto. This is considered Europe's biggest ever lottery win.

== Main sights ==
=== The church of the Madonna del Pianto ===
The church of Madonna del Pianto has a rectangular shape with a unique nave with neoclassical columns and two semi-octagons on the lateral sides. The sacred complex has a central dome, a balustrade with a chess paving decorated with polychrom marbles which opens to a major altar and a wide choir. The True Cross relic is venerated on 5 May and on 14 September each year.

Near the apse there is a pipe organ with three spans and a pediment shaped as a tympanum. The pipe organ was built in 1899 by Gaetano Cavalli of Lodi.

== History ==
Bagnone has been inhabited by humans since at least prehistoric times, proven by the finding of a stele statue in 1969. Bagnone was first formally mentioned in a document from 963.

In the 15th century, Bagnone became the seat of a vicariate governed by Florence.

== Notes ==
Media related to Bagnone at Wikimedia Commons
