= Comano, Tuscany =

Comano
- Comune
- Comune di Comano
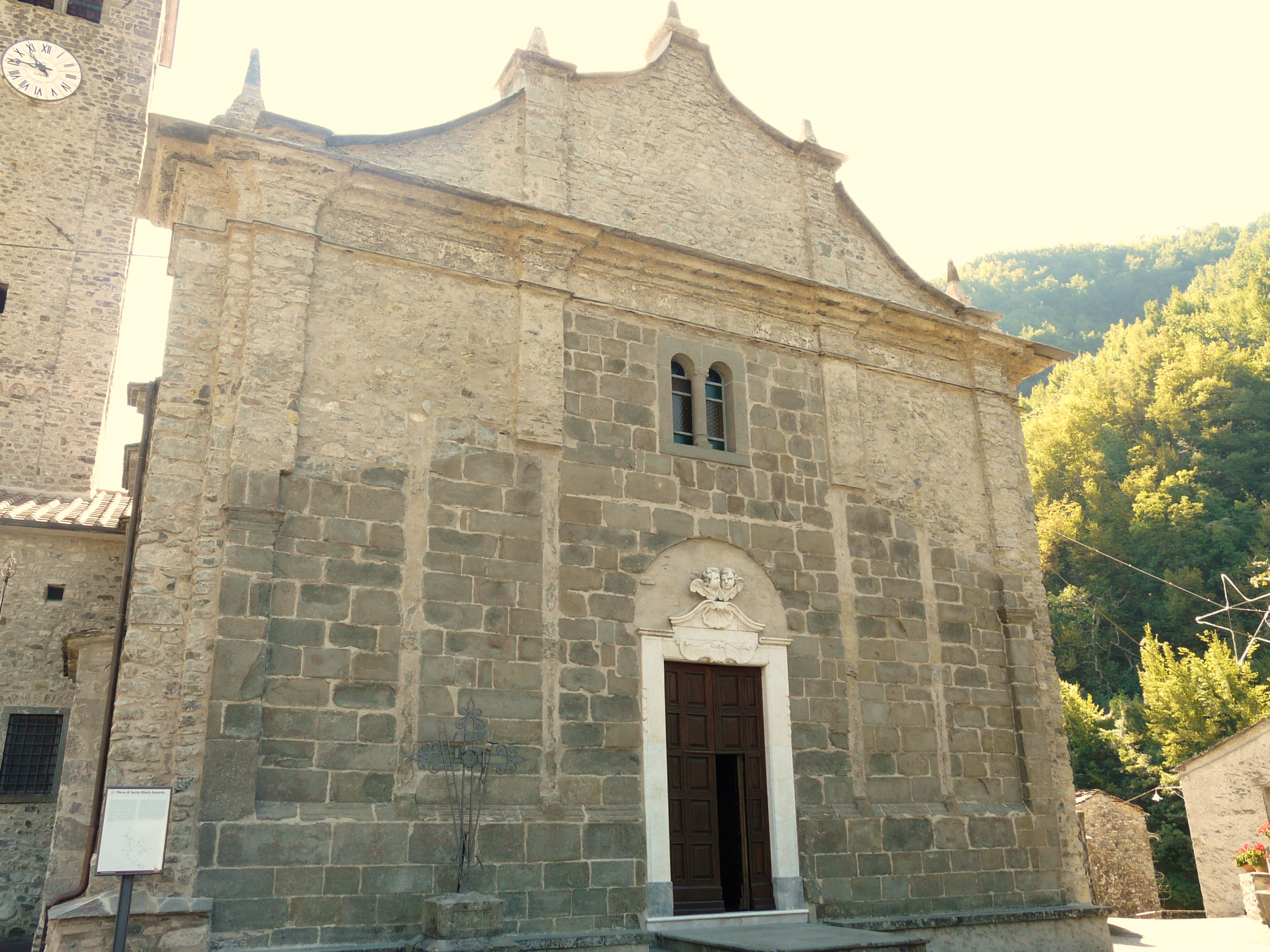
- Pieve of Santa Maria Assunta at Crespiano.

- Location within Italy Location within Tuscany
- Coordinates: 44°17′N 10°08′E
- Country: Italy
- Region: Tuscany
- Province: Massa and Carrara (MS)
- Frazioni: Camporaghena, Cattognano, Crespiano, Lagastrello, Montale, Prota, Torsana

Government
  - Mayor: Cesare Leri

Area
  - Total: 54 km^{2} (21 sq mi)
- Elevation: 530 m (1,740 ft)

Population (30 June 2017)
  - Total: 699
  - Density: 13/km^{2} (34/sq mi)
- Demonym: Comanini
- Time zone: UTC+1 (CET)
  - Summer (DST): UTC+2 (CEST)
- Postal code: 54015
- Dialing code: 0187
- Website: Official website

Comano is a town and comune in the province of Massa and Carrara, Tuscany, Italy, of some 700 inhabitants.

In the nearby is the pieve of Santa Maria Assunta. It was rebuilt in 1079 in Romanesque style; later it was modified in Renaissance and Baroque times. It has also a castle.

== History ==
Comano is mentioned in history for the first time in a document dated 938, when King Ugo of Provence gave the town and its castle to his wife Berta as a wedding gift. These lands attracted the attention of the Este family which selected Comano as their point of departure for extending their dominion into Lunigiana. The time of Countess Matilde, the brief dominion of Castruccio Castracani of the Antiminelli, and the rise of the Malaspina family are milestones in local history.

Comano was part of the territory of Spinetta Malaspina the Great who let the inheritance to his successors when he died (1352): Gabriele, Gugliemo and Galeotto Malaspina, sons of Azzolino II (brother of Spinetta) who therefore wore the title of Signori di Fosdinovo, Marciaso, Comano and Le Terre dei Bianchi. Subsequently, Comano became part of the Marquis of Fivizzano, and then under the Republic of Florence in 1478. With the Unity of Italy, Comano became an outlying town of the municipality of Fivizzano and continued to be until 26 April 1918 when it became an autonomous municipality.

== Geography ==
Comano is situated in the area of Lunigiana in Tuscany, with the main town at the head of the Taverone valley with a backdrop of the breathtaking Apennine Mountains. There are many walking trails leading from the town centre of Comano and the surrounding villages to the hills and mountain peaks. The town, surrounded by the farming community, hosts an annual horse festival in the summer and offers a good selection of shops, restaurants and sport facilities. The landscape varies from green pastures, chestnut hills and stretches to the high Apennine range. Comano is part of Lungiana, an area that stretches from the coast to the Apennine mountain ridges.

=== Frazioni ===
The municipality of Comano comprises three main villages: Comano (530 metres (1,740 ft) alt., population 277), Castello (605 metres (1,985 ft) alt., population 55) and Piano (610 metres (2,000 ft) alt., population 123).

The territory of Comano also comprises many outlying villages: Cabeva, Camporaghena, Campungano, Canola, Casa Pelati, Castello, Castello di Camporaghena, Cassettana, Castagneto di Crespiano, Cattognano, Chiosi, Crespiano, Croce, Felegara, Fontana Rosa, Fumagna, Imocomano, La Costa, Lagastrello, La Greta, La Piana-Groppo San Pietro, La Vigna-Ropiccio, Linari, Montalbino-Battagliolo, Montale, Monterotondo, Piagneto, Piano, Pieve di Crespiano, Prato Castellano, Prota, Scanderaruola, Summocomano, Torsana, and Villa di Cattognano.

== Main sights ==
- Church of San Giorgio
- Church of San Giovanni Battista in the village of Montale
- Church of Santi Pietro e Paolo in the village of Camporaghena
- Church of San Genesio in the village of Prota
- Church of San Giacomo in the village of Torsana
- Ancient church Pieve di Santa Maria Assunta in the village of Crespiano
- Castle of Comano
- Castle of Groppo San Pietro
