= List of mayors of Massa =

Mayor of Massa
- Sindaco di Massa
- Incumbent; Francesco Persiani since 31 May 2023
- Appointer: Popular election
- Term length: 5 years, renewable once
- Formation: 1865
- Website: Official website

The mayor of Massa is an elected politician who, along with the Massa City Council, is accountable for the strategic government of Massa in Tuscany, Italy.

The current mayor is Francesco Persiani (Lega), who took office on 31 May 2023.

== Overview ==
According to the Italian Constitution, the mayor of Massa is member of the City Council.

The mayor is elected by the population of Massa, who also elect the members of the City Council, controlling the mayor's policy guidelines and is able to enforce his resignation by a motion of no confidence. The mayor is entitled to appoint and release the members of his government.

Since 1994 the mayor is elected directly by Massa's electorate: in all mayoral elections in Italy in cities with a population higher than 15,000 the voters express a direct choice for the mayor or an indirect choice voting for the party of the candidate's coalition. If no candidate receives at least 50% of votes, the top two candidates go to a second round after two weeks. The election of the City Council is based on a direct choice for the candidate with a preference vote: the candidate with the majority of the preferences is elected. The number of the seats for each party is determined proportionally.

== Italian Republic (since 1946) ==
=== City Council election (1946-1994) ===
From 1946 to 1994, the Mayor of Massa was elected by the City Council.

	Mayor	Term start	Term end	Party
1	Giulio Guidoni	3 May 1946	9 March 1948	DC
2	Gino Cecchieri	9 March 1948	4 October 1957	DC
Special Prefectural Commissioner's tenure (4 October 1957 – 2 December 1958)
3	Alberto Del Nero	2 December 1958	5 December 1962	DC
4	Renato Argini	5 December 1962	22 January 1963	PSI
5	Silvio Balderi	22 January 1963	3 January 1968	DC
6	Ennio Fialdini	3 January 1968	5 March 1968	DC
7	Umberto Barbaresi	5 March 1968	17 April 1969	PSI
Special Prefectural Commissioner's tenure (17 April 1969 – 11 September 1970)
(6)	Ennio Fialdini	11 September 1970	25 September 1975	DC
8	Silvio Tongiani	25 September 1975	8 August 1980	PCI
(7)	Umberto Barbaresi	8 August 1980	20 September 1985	PSI
9	Sauro Panesi	20 September 1985	5 August 1986	PSI
10	Mauro Carlo Pennacchiotti	5 August 1986	9 August 1990	PRI
11	Ermenegildo Manfredi	9 August 1990	16 November 1993	DC
12	Luigi Della Pina	16 November 1993	9 August 1994	DC
Special Prefectural Commissioner's tenure (9 August 1994 – 5 December 1994)

=== Direct election (since 1994) ===
Since 1994, under provisions of new local administration law, the Mayor of Massa is chosen by direct election, originally every four, then every five years.

	Mayor	Term start	Term end	Party	Coalition	Election
13	Roberto Pucci	5 December 1994	1 December 1998	PDS; DS	PDS • PPI • PRI • FL	1994
13	Roberto Pucci	1 December 1998	27 May 2003	PDS; DS	DS • PPI • PRI • SDI	1998
14	Fabrizio Neri	27 May 2003	28 April 2008	DL; PD	DS • DL • PdCI • SDI • FdV	2003
(13)	Roberto Pucci	28 April 2008	29 May 2013	Ind	SA	2008
15	Alessandro Volpi	29 May 2013	26 June 2018	PD	PD • SEL • PSI • PRC	2013
16	Francesco Persiani	26 June 2018	3 March 2023 (Note: Resigned.)	Lega	FI • Lega • FdI	2018
Special Prefectural Commissioner's tenure (3 March 2023 – 31 May 2023)
(16)	Francesco Persiani	31 May 2023	Incumbent	Lega	FI • Lega • FdI	2023

== Bibliography ==
- "Sindaci, quale carriera dopo l'elezione". 26 April 2008.
