= Montignoso =

- Comune
- Comune di Montignoso
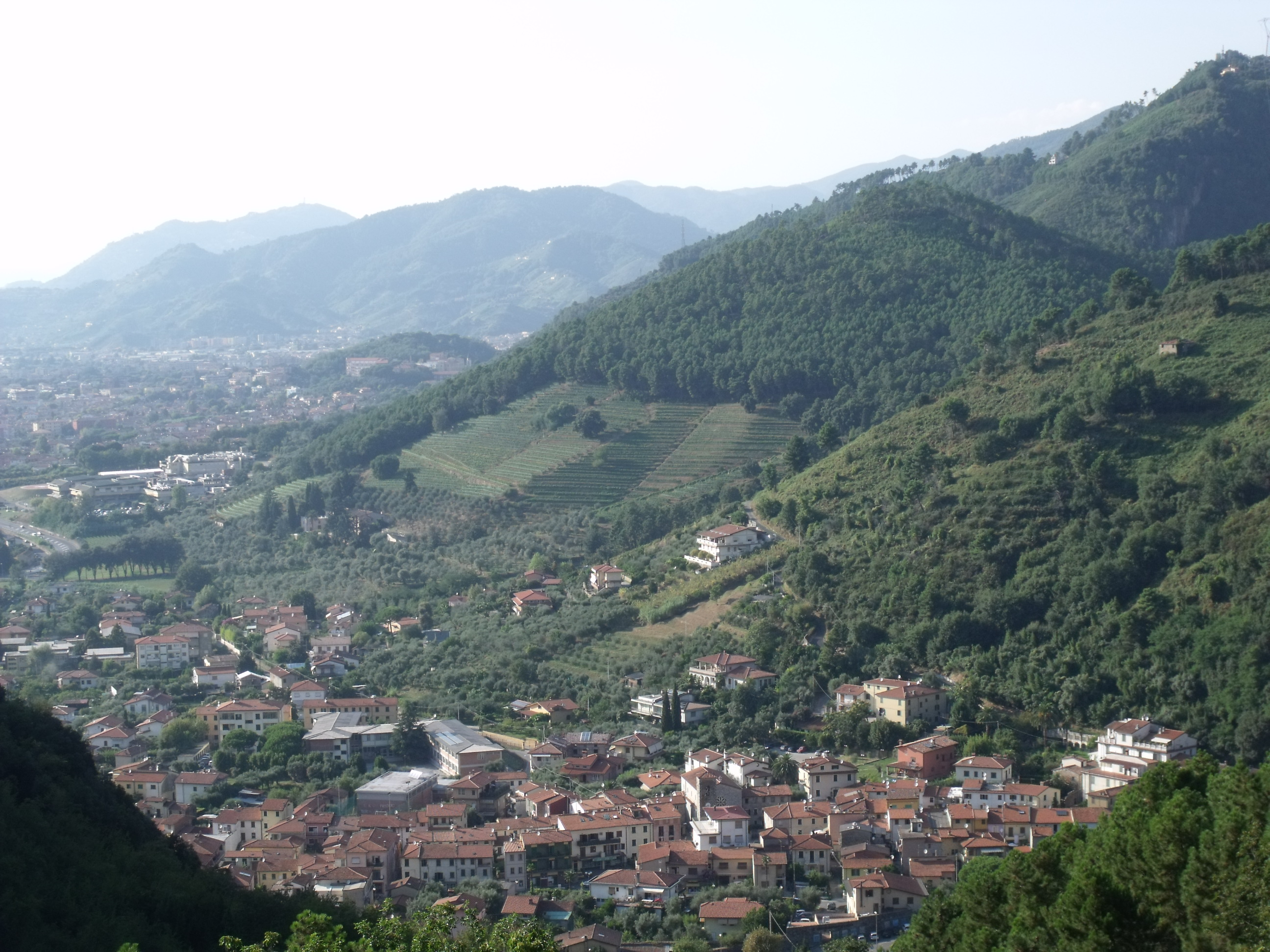

- Coat of arms

- Location within Italy Location within Tuscany
- Coordinates: 44°1′N 10°10′E
- Country: Italy
- Region: Tuscany
- Province: Massa and Carrara (MS)
- Frazioni: Capanne, Cerreto, Cervaiolo, Cinquale, Corsanico, Debbia, Palatina, Pasquilio, Piazza, Porta (lago), Prato, Renella, Rifugio Pasquilio, Sant'Eustachio, San Vito, Serra, Vietina

Government
  - Mayor: Alberto Nardi Perna

Area
  - Total: 16.74 km^{2} (6.46 sq mi)
- Elevation: 131 m (430 ft)

Population (30 November 2017)
  - Total: 10,289
  - Density: 614.6/km^{2} (1,592/sq mi)
- Demonym(s): Montignosini, Monceri
- Time zone: UTC+1 (CET)
  - Summer (DST): UTC+2 (CEST)
- Postal code: 54038
- Dialing code: 0585
- Website: Official website

Montignoso is a comune (municipality) in the Province of Massa and Carrara in the Italian region Tuscany, located about 90 kilometres (56 mi) northwest of Florence and about 3 kilometres (1.9 mi) southeast of Massa.

Another version of the coat of arms, used on the gonfalon.

Montignoso borders the following municipalities: Forte dei Marmi, Massa, Pietrasanta, Seravezza.
