= Fivizzano =

- Comune
- Comune di Fivizzano
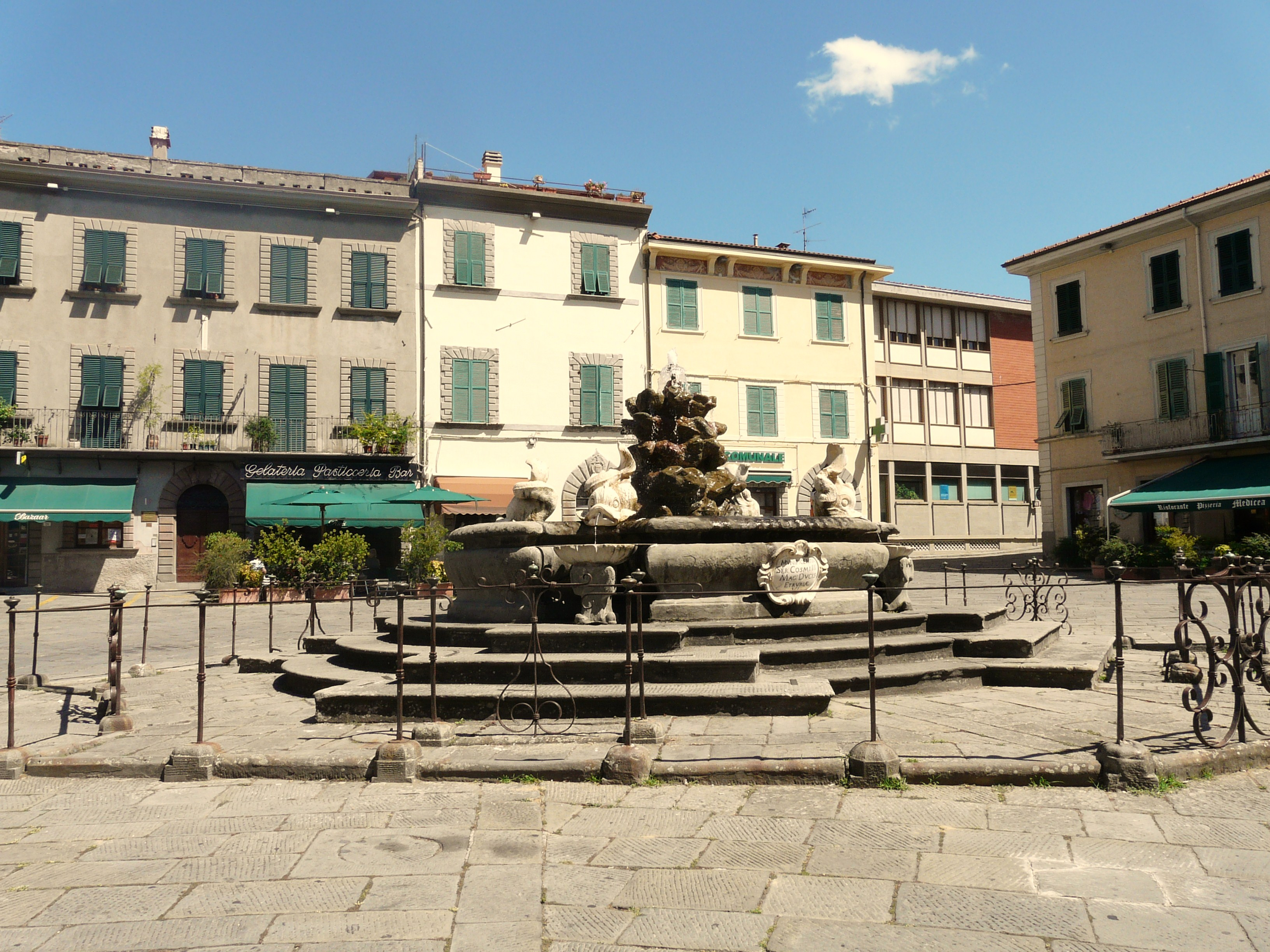
- Piazza Medicea

- Coat of arms

- Location within Italy Location within Tuscany
- Coordinates: 44°14′N 10°08′E
- Country: Italy
- Region: Tuscany
- Province: Massa and Carrara (MS)

Government
  - Mayor: Gian Luigi Giannetti

Area
  - Total: 180 km^{2} (69 sq mi)
- Elevation: 326 m (1,070 ft)

Population (31 August 2017)
  - Total: 7,787
  - Density: 43/km^{2} (110/sq mi)
- Demonym: Fivizzanesi
- Time zone: UTC+1 (CET)
  - Summer (DST): UTC+2 (CEST)
- Postal code: 54013
- Dialing code: 0585
- Patron saint: St. Anthony the Abbot
- Website: Official website

Fivizzano is a comune in the province of Massa and Carrara, Tuscany, central Italy.

== History ==
It became part of the Republic of Florence in the 15th century thus gaining the Tuscan republic an important foothold in Lunigiana, a key region which Genoa, Lucca, Pisa, Milan and Florence had sought to dominate since the early Middle Ages.

In August 1944 the region was the scene of the San Terenzo Monti and Vinca massacres, carried out by soldiers of the 16th SS Panzergrenadier Division.

== Culture ==
Events in the town include:

- The annual Disfida degli Arceri di terra e di Corte (Challenge of the Ground Archers and the Court Archers), a historical archery contest which takes place in July in the Piazza Medicea.
- The annual "Tangoworld" festival in September. It is one of the largest representations of Argentinian tango in Italy.

== Main sights ==
- Fortress of Verrucola, dating from as early as the 12th century
- Orto Botanico dei Frignoli: botanical garden and nature preserve
- Fivizzano Museum of Printing, located in the Palazzo Fantoni Bononi, was created by Loris Jacopo Bononi to honor the printer Jacopo da Fivizzano who printed the first books with typed characters in c. 1470
- Fivizzano city walls: rebuilt under the direction of Cosimo I de' Medici, Grand Duke of Tuscany, in the middle of the 16th century after they had been destroyed by Charles VIII of France during his invasion of Italy.
- The Baroque fountain in the main piazza, donated by Cosimo III de' Medici in 1683
- The birthplace/tomb of poet Giovanni Fantoni (1755–1807), called the 'Tuscan Orazio'. Better known by his Archadian name 'Labindo'
- Fivizzano's Augustinian monastery, founded in 1391 and seriously damaged by the earthquake of 1920, was the second Augustinian monastery built in Tuscany and as such it was one of the most culturally significant monasteries of that order in Italy. The monastery and its adjacent church, San Giovanni (constructed in 1335), was the home base to native-born Augustinian cleric Leonardo da Vallazzana. Known as Leonardo da Fivizzano, his oratorical skills captivated Lorenzo the Magnificent and church goers throughout Florence, and were used to formally announce the excommunication of the Dominican cleric Savonarola. The monastery was also the home of Alessio Cassani (subject of the University of Pisa thesis of Sandro Bondi, previous mayor of Fivizzano and former Minister of Culture), a friar accused of heresy for hiding within the monastery numerous writings favorable to Luther.
- The Museum of San Giovanni, built within the ruins of the church of San Giovanni and adjacent to the foundations of the Augustinian monastery. It displays the marble lid of the sarcophagus where the sculpted body of the Augustinian cleric Leonardo da Vallanzana (Leonardo da Fivizzano), the nemesis of Savonarola, is displayed, resting cross-armed on a bed of books. Displays in this small museum also include a view of the original ancient foundations of the building as well as Medieval, Renaissance and modern paintings, frescoes, and tapestries.

== Notable people ==
- Pope Nicholas V was born in Fivizzano.
- Sandro Bondi, politician
- Peter Chelsom, actor and director
- Giorgia Fumanti, soprano
- Denis Verdini, politician

== Sister cities ==
Fivizzano is twinned with:

- Steinhagen, Germany
- Castelnovo ne' Monti, Italy
