= Casola in Lunigiana =

- Comune
- Comune di Casola in Lunigiana
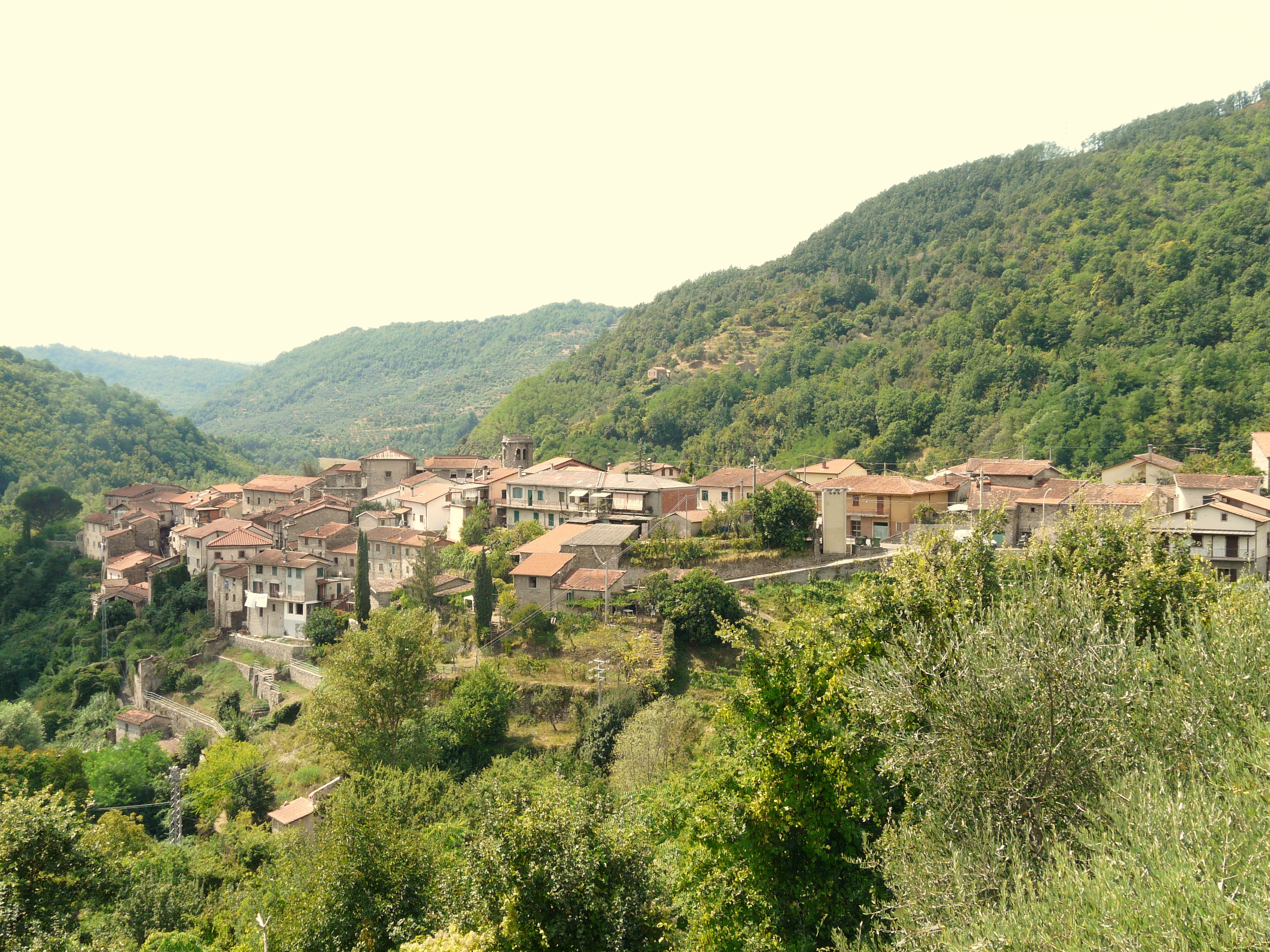

- Coat of arms

- Location within Italy Location within Tuscany
- Coordinates: 44°12′N 10°11′E
- Country: Italy
- Region: Tuscany
- Province: Massa and Carrara (MS)
- Frazioni: Argigliano, Casciana, Castello di Regnano, Castiglioncello, Codiponte, Luscignano, Regnano, Reusa Padula, Ugliancaldo, Vedriano, Vigneta, Vimaiola Montefiore

Government
  - Mayor: Mattia Leonardi

Area
  - Total: 42.4 km^{2} (16.4 sq mi)
- Elevation: 328 m (1,076 ft)

Population (30 June 2017)
  - Total: 1,022
  - Density: 24.1/km^{2} (62.4/sq mi)
- Demonym: Casolini
- Time zone: UTC+1 (CET)
  - Summer (DST): UTC+2 (CEST)
- Postal code: 54014
- Dialing code: 0585
- Patron saint: San Pellegrino
- Saint day: August 1

Casola in Lunigiana is a comune (municipality) in the Province of Massa and Carrara in the Italian region Tuscany, located about 100 kilometres (62 mi) northwest of Florence and about 20 kilometres (12 mi) north of Massa.

== Main sights ==
- Church of Santa Felicita. Known from the late 13th century, it was later restored in Baroque style.
- Pieve of Sts. Cornelio e Cipriano, at Codiponte. Probably existing before 793 AD, it includes a basilica with a nave and two aisles, dating from the 12th century.
- Pieve of San Pietro, at Offiano. Of Romanesque origin, it was modified in Baroque style in the 18th century.
- Church of Santa Margherita, at Regnano
- Church of Sant'Andrea (15th century), at Ugliancaldo.
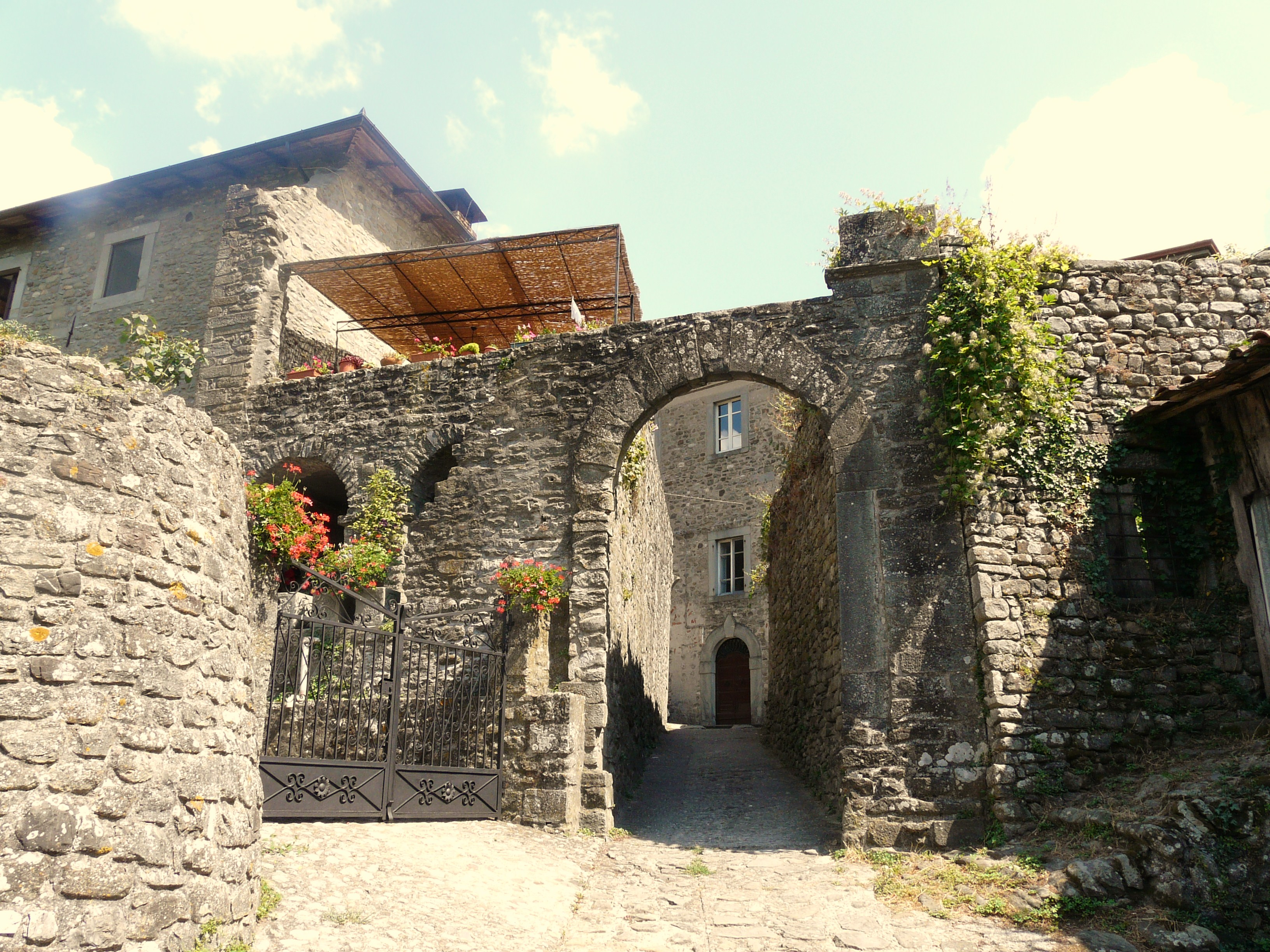
Gate of the historical centre.
