= Giovanni Fantoni =

Italian poet

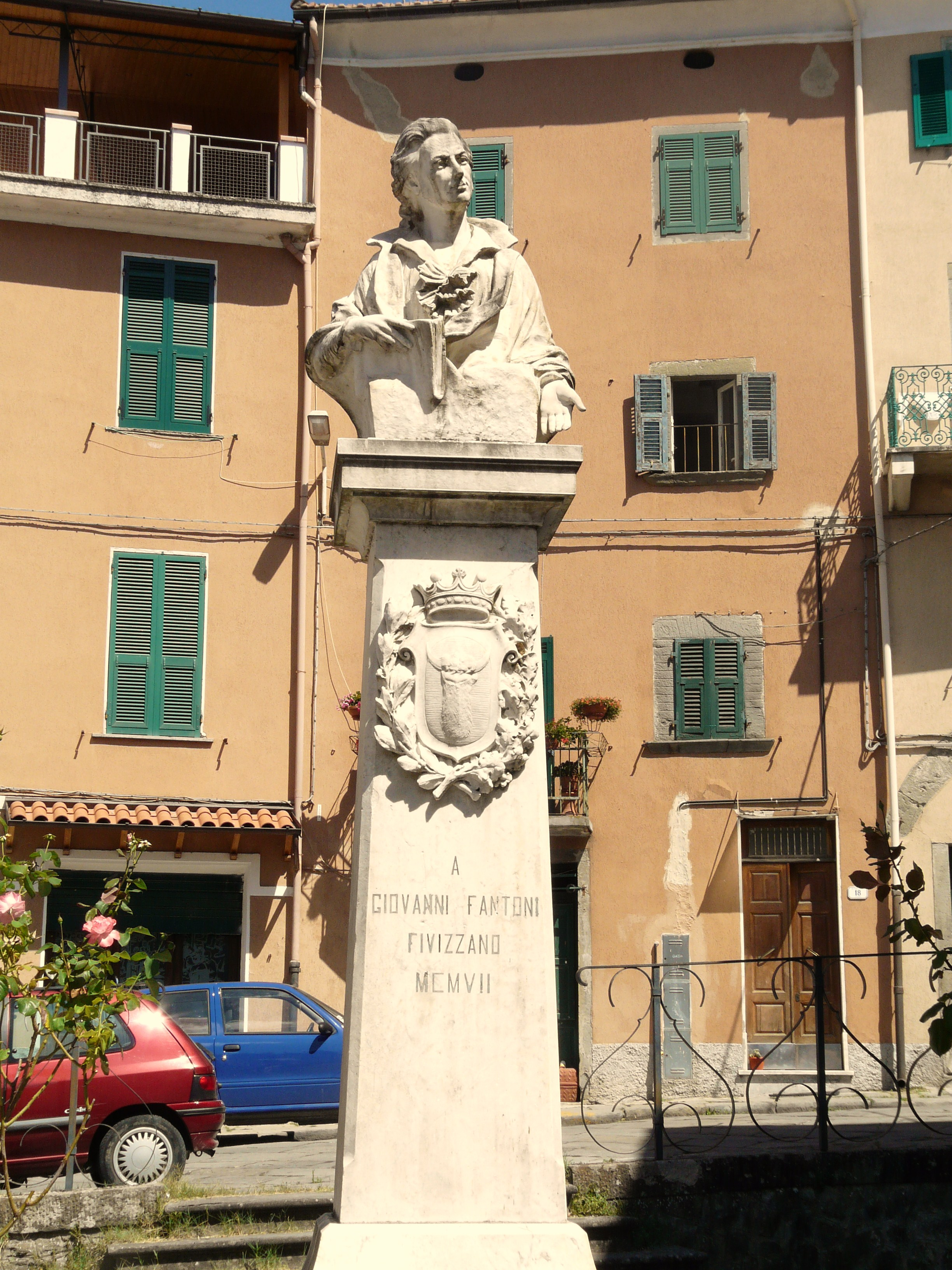
Monument to the poet in his hometown, Fivizzano.

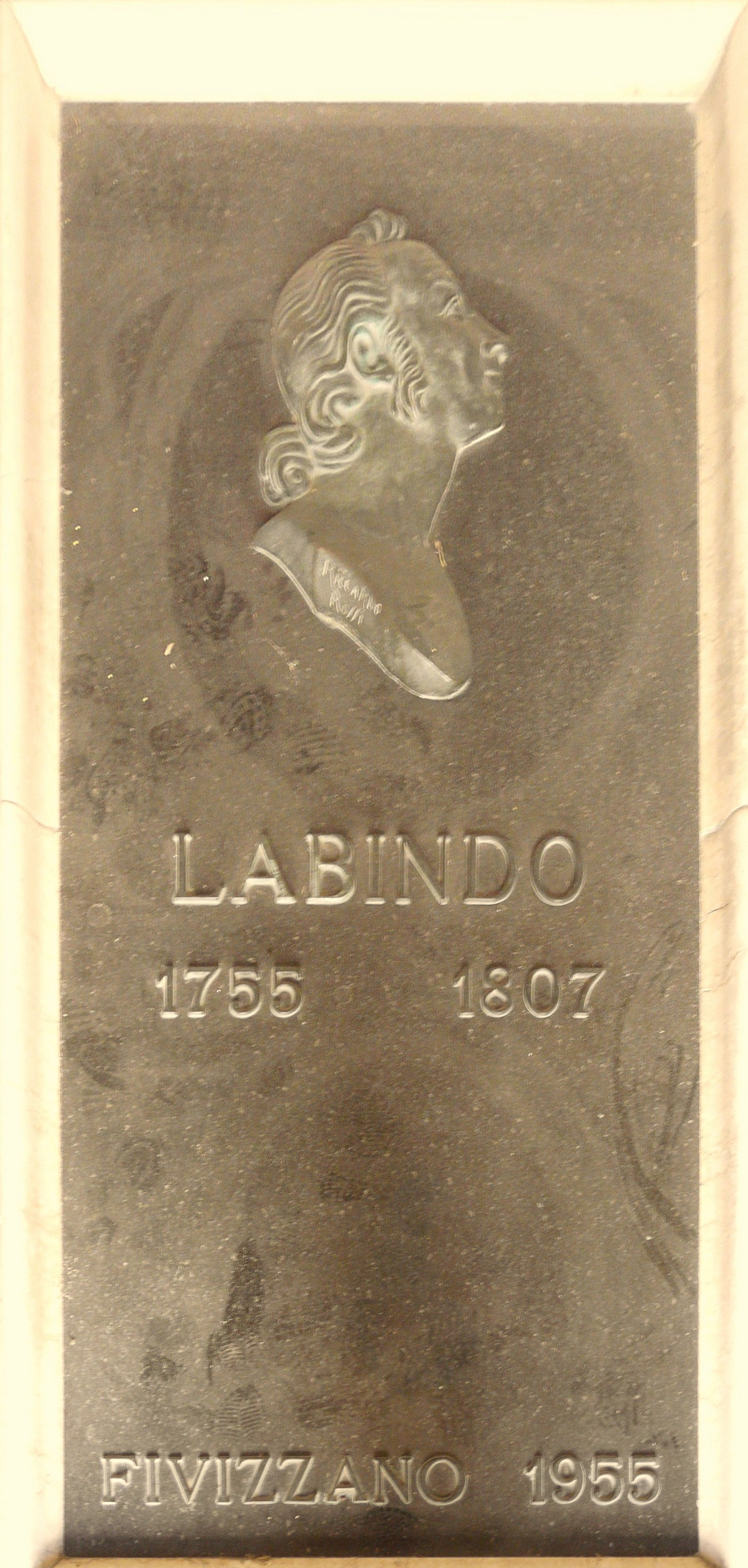
Giovanni Fantoni's tomb inside the oratory of San Carlo di Fivizzano.

Giovanni Fantoni (1755—1807) was an Italian poet.

== Biography ==
Third son of Count Lodovico Antonio Fantoni and the Marquise Anna De Silva della Banditella, and therefore excluded from the hereditary axis in compliance with the law of the majorasco, he was initiated into ecclesiastical life and educated in the Benedictine monastery in Subiaco and, three years later, in the Nazarene College of Piarists in Rome; but his character intolerant of discipline and his anti-clerical spirit were not compatible with monastic life. In 1772 Giovanni left the college and obtained a post as an apprentice at the secretariat of state in Florence but was unable to achieve satisfactory results. His father therefore decided to initiate him into a military career by sending him first among the cadets in Livorno and then in 1775 following his uncle Andrea De Silva in Turin who enrolled him in the Royal Academy and managed to get him a position as an infantry lieutenant. In this same period, his old tutor informed him of his admission to the Academy of Arcadia with the name of Labindo Arsinoetico. In this same period, his old tutor informed him of his admission to the Academy of Arcadia with the name of Labindo Arsinoetico. In the following years, however, Fantoni's nature proved unsuitable even for this career and, after resigning, he even ended up risking arrest for debt.

During 1779, on his pilgrimage home, he stopped in Genoa and continued to lead a worldly life, again contracting numerous debts and dedicating himself to numerous female acquaintances, above all the marquise Maria Doria Spinola. From this Genoese period there is even a report on the poet sent by an anonymous person to the Ligurian government: «This one is very young and seductive in manners, so he is idolized by his young contemporaries, and also by the most refined ladies, with whom he uses unusual caresses among us and condemned by the virtuous.

== Political commitment ==
Perhaps the most significant period of Giovanni Fantoni's political experience is represented by the Republican Triennium when, between 1796 and 1799, the French occupation of the Peninsula led to the formation of the sister Republics. These new states became the main point of reference for the action of the Italian patriots, so much so that many of them went to the occupied territories to participate in the turmoil and political life of the regions; among these there was also Fantoni. As evidence of this, there are various events in which the Tuscan poet took part: the revolutionary uprisings, the siege of Montechiarugolo, the second Congress of the Cispadan Confederation, the defense of Genoa. However, Labindo's involvement was not limited only to direct participation in these events; at the same time, in fact, he also carried out some activities that perhaps most of all return a clear image of his commitment and his political vision. During the Reggio riots, he became the protagonist of propaganda actions to persuade citizens to establish a democratic government and a path of public education accessible to all. The importance attributed to education is also found in his attempt to bring young people closer to republican values when, in Modena, on 21 May 1797, he invited them to set up a symbolic Regiment of Hope in charge of defending the republic from any reactionary attempt.

Fantoni's commitment was also very strong in some intellectual circles and secret societies such as the Milanese constitutional circle and the Società dei Raggi. Through these channels he was able to participate in the political discussion and government of the new republican states, sometimes even practicing subversive conspiratorial activities towards the French government itself. The two arrests suffered by the Tuscan poet were precisely caused by dissent towards the transalpine government: the first following protests for the drafting of a more conservative constitution imposed by the French government on the Cisalpine republic, the second for opposition to the annexation of the Kingdom of Sardinia to France.
