= Aulla =

- Comune
- Comune di Aulla
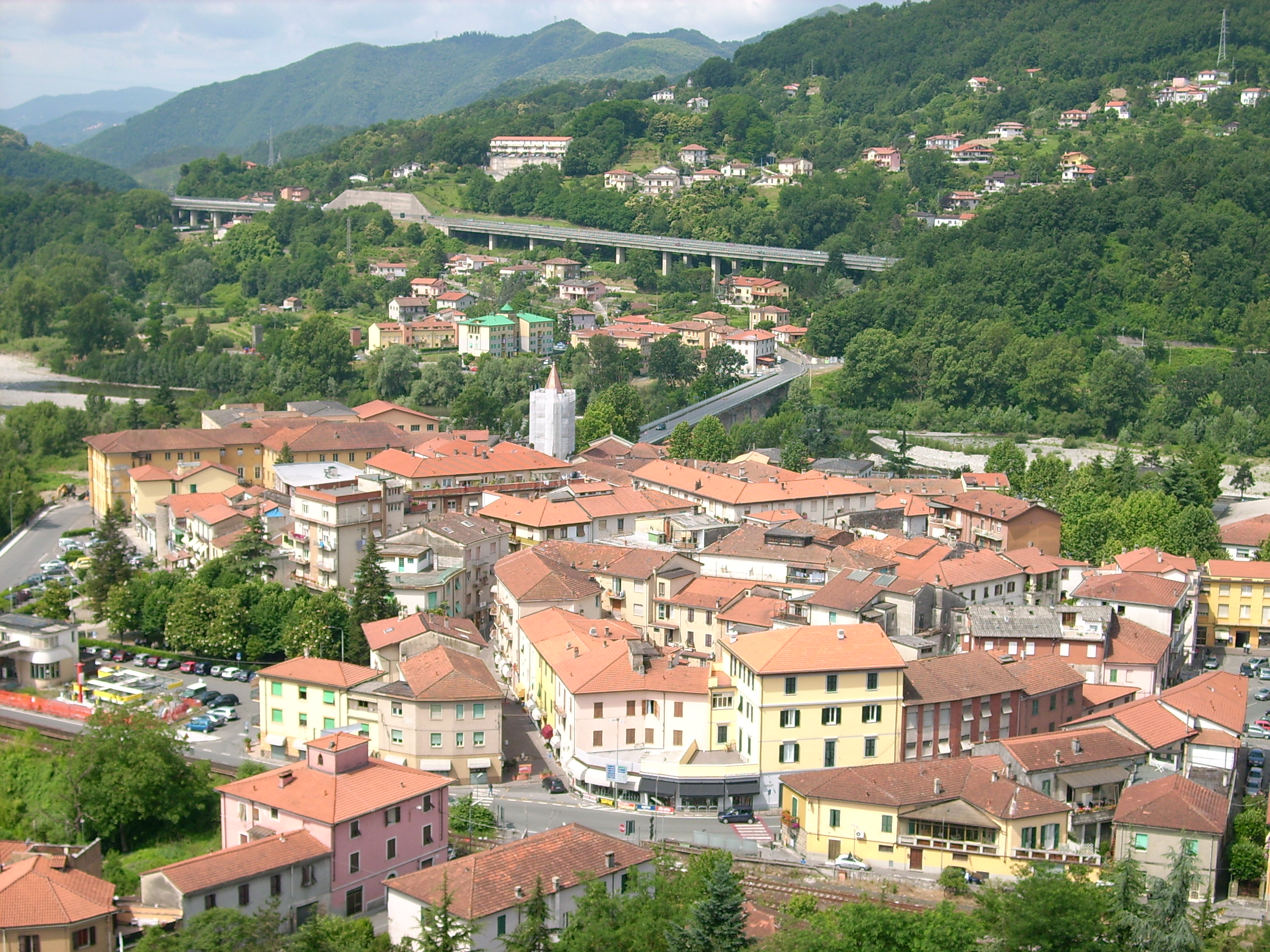
- Panorama of Aulla

- Coat of arms

- Location within Italy Location within Tuscany
- Coordinates: 44°13′N 09°58′E
- Country: Italy
- Region: Tuscany
- Province: Massa and Carrara

Government
  - Mayor: Roberto Valettini

Area
  - Total: 5,999 km^{2} (2,316 sq mi)
- Elevation: 64 m (210 ft)

Population (30 June 2017)
  - Total: 11,065
  - Density: 1.844/km^{2} (4.777/sq mi)
- Demonym: Aullesi
- Time zone: UTC+1 (CET)
  - Summer (DST): UTC+2 (CEST)
- Postal code: 54011
- Dialing code: 0187
- Patron saint: St. Caprasius
- Website: Official website

Aulla is a comune in the province of Massa and Carrara, Tuscany, central Italy. It is located in the valley of the River Magra.

== Geology ==
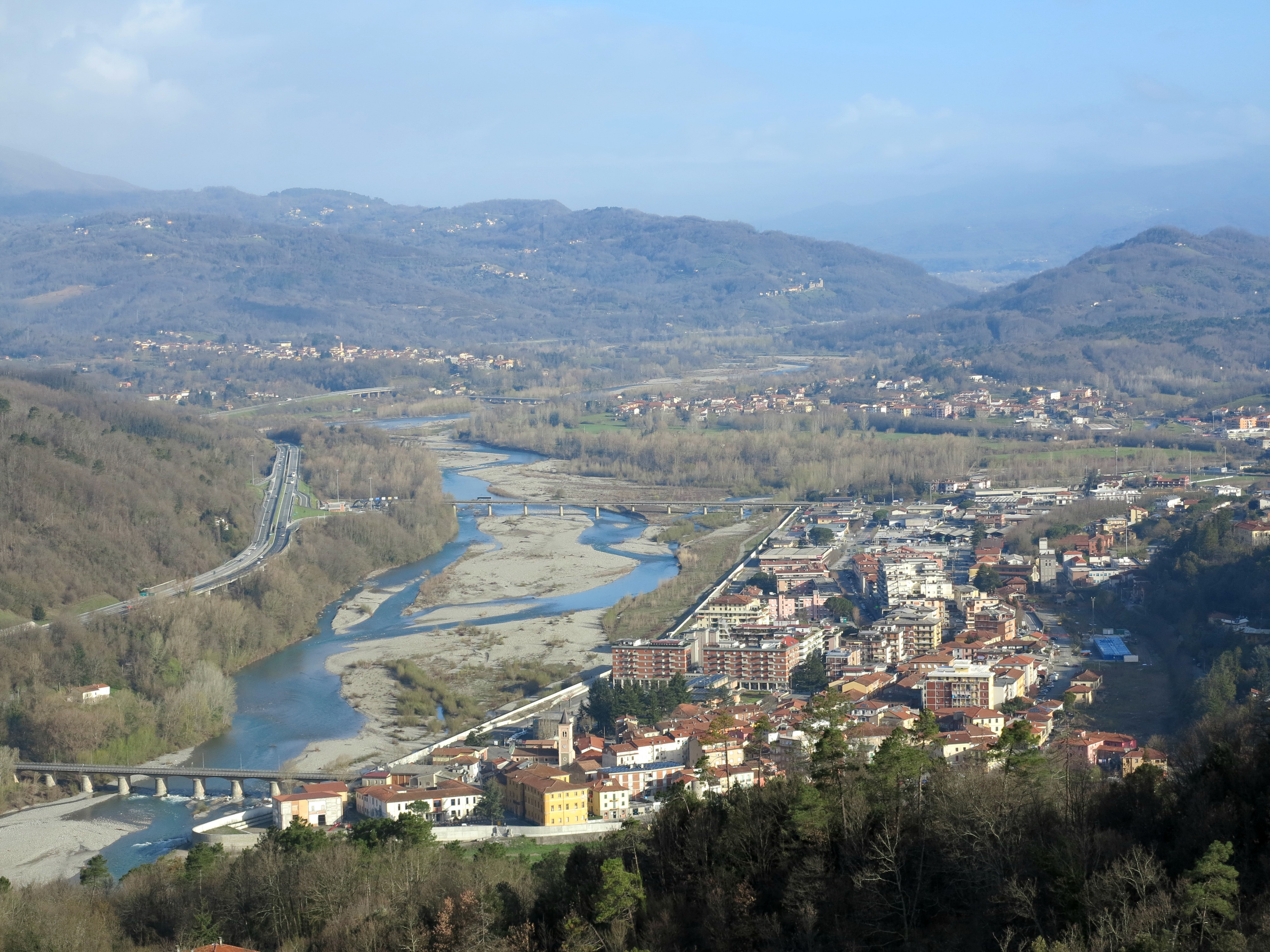
Wide river bed of Magra in Aulla, upstream to Barbarasco and Lusuolo castle

In 1977, the Italian geologist Augusto Azzaroli discovered a series of mammal rests with a correlated fauna in the adjacent locality of Olivola. The so-called Olivola Conglomerates dated back to the late Villafranchian age (1.0 to 3.5 million years ago).

In the following year, a first level of continental sedimentary remains was found at a depth of 250 metres, with the following archaic tree species: Taxodium, Sequoia, Magnolia, Symplocos and Sapotaceae. In Europe, these species are usually dated to the pre-Pleistocene (over 2.5 million years ago). Their presence confirmed the hypothesis of a temperate to warm climate.

Deer fossils have also been found in Aulla, from the Procaproleus causanus and Pseudodama pardinensis lyra species which in the Western Europe "are characteristic of the mammal assemblages of the Early [Villafranchian" period (3.5-1.0 Ma). These animal fossils contrast with the oldest and deepest strata of sedimentary deposits and the so-called Olivola Conglomerates. Some researchers supposed they didn't originate in this area, given that fossils referred to the Villafranchian age are relatively common in Italy.

== History ==
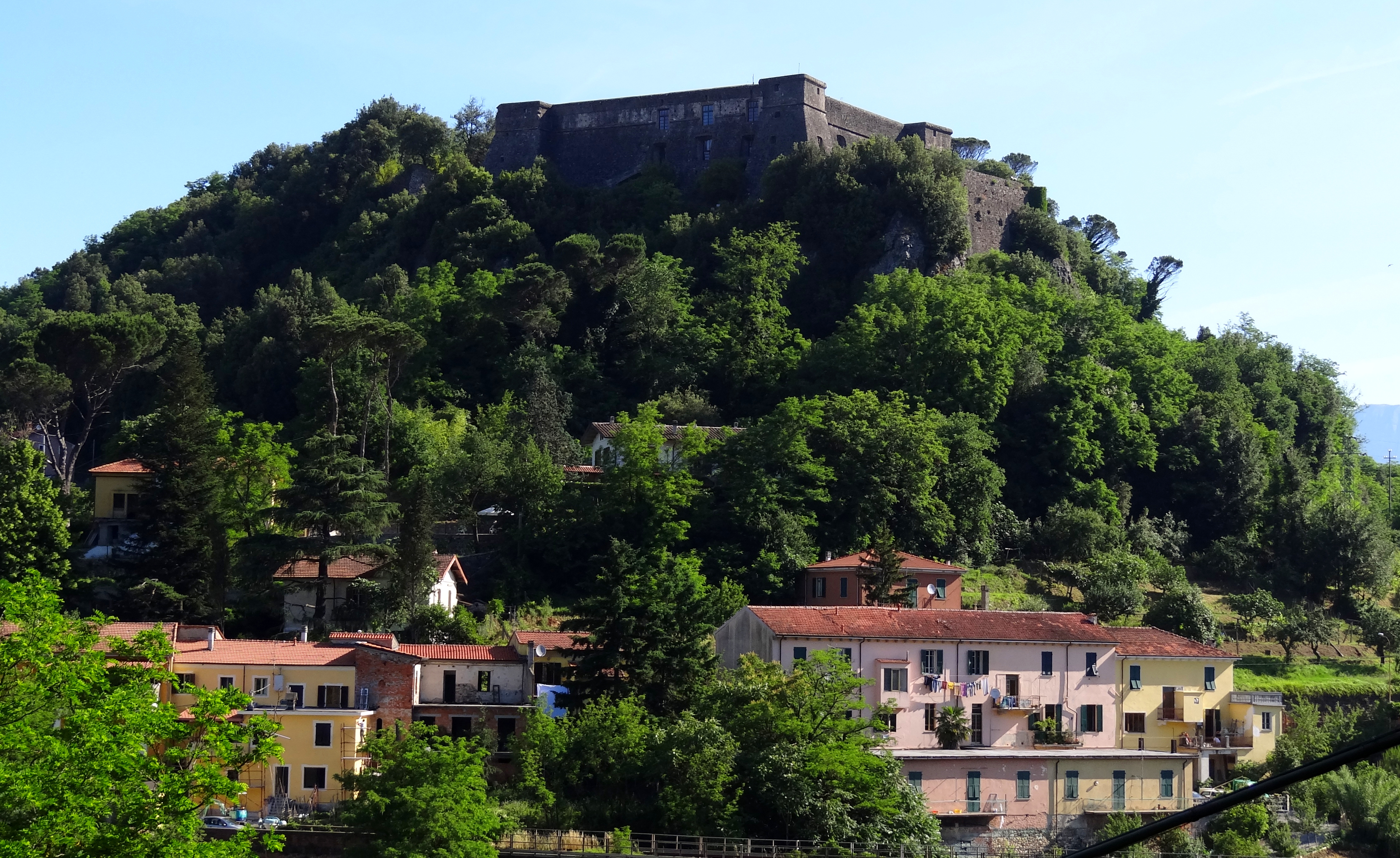
The walls of the Brunella Fortress above Aulla

Traces of Roman and Etruscan civilizations found in the church of the Abbey of San Caprasio indicate that there were settlements in Aulla long before the 8th century CE, when margrave Adalbert I of Tuscany founded a village and built a castle to accommodate pilgrims traveling the via Francigena. Here, at Aguilla Sigeric, Archbishop of Canterbury, sojourned on his return journey from Rome about 990. The Malaspina family wrested feudal power of the city and its contada from the domination of the bishops and dukes of Luni. In 1543 the Centurione family purchased it. They built the Brunella Fortress, which was bought in the early 20th century by Aubrey and Lina Waterfield, and remains privately owned, functioning as a museum of natural history for the Lunigiana region. Prominent among the buildings of the town is the Abbey of San Caprasio that was founded in the 9th century and named after Saint Caprasius of Lérins, whose body was transferred to Aulla in the 10th century.

In 1943, the historic center of Aulla was destroyed by Anglo-American bombings. Aimed at German troops stationed there during the Second World War, the bombings sought to destroy the town's key railroad network and gunpowder manufacturing plant. A replica of an unexploded bomb is preserved in the former abbey of San Caprasio, which is now a museum.

In April 1945 the 442nd Infantry Regiment (United States), aided by a significantly strong Italian partisan fighting force, liberated the city of Aulla, after fierce battles with retreating German troops.

On 8 April 2020, a 260 metre long road bridge at Albiano Magra near Aulla collapsed into the River Magra. The traffic on the bridge was unusually light due to the coronavirus lockdown then in force, and the collapse resulted in only minor injuries to two casualties.

== Sister City ==
- Villerupt, France
