= Province of Massa-Carrara =

Province of Italy

Province of Massa-Carrara Provincia di Massa-Carrara (Italian)
- Province
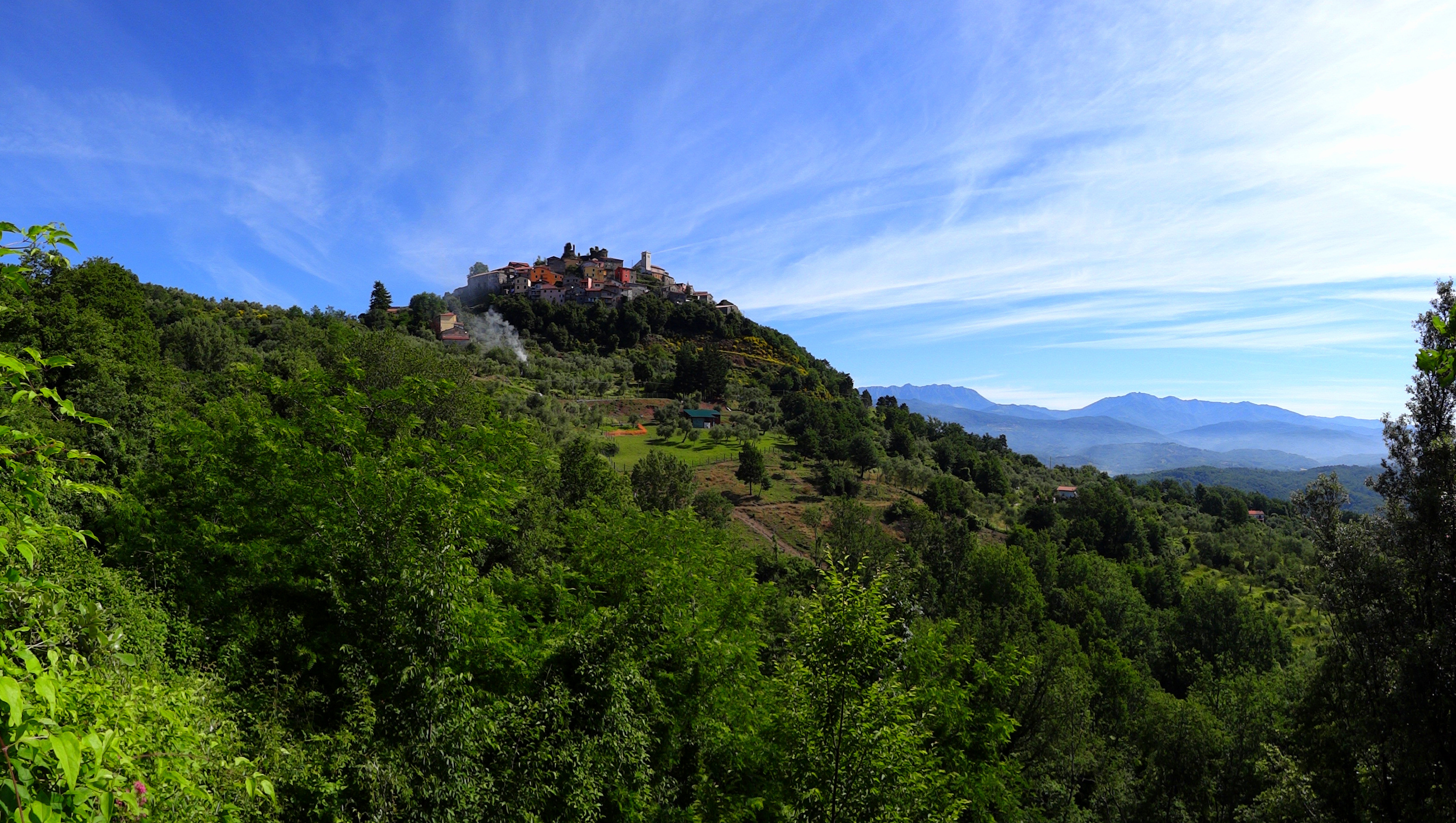
- The village of Bibola, south of Aulla

- Flag Coat of arms

- Location of the province of Massa and Carrara in Italy
- Coordinates: 44.3°N 10°E
- Country: Italy
- Region: Tuscany
- Capital(s): Massa
- Municipalities: 17

Government
  - President: Roberto Valettini

Area
  - Total: 1,154.68 km^{2} (445.82 sq mi)

Population (2026)
  - Total: 186,637
  - Density: 161.635/km^{2} (418.633/sq mi)

GDP
  - Total: €4.657 billion (2015)
  - Per capita: €23,454 (2015)
- Time zone: UTC+1 (CET)
  - Summer (DST): UTC+2 (CEST)
- Postal code: 54100
- Telephone prefix: 0585
- Vehicle registration: MS
- ISTAT code: 045
- Website: Official website

The Province of Massa-Carrara (Italian: Provincia di Massa-Carrara) is a province in the region of Tuscany in central Italy. It is named after the provincial capital Massa, and Carrara, the other main town in the province.

It has a population of 186,637 in an area of 1,154.68 square kilometres (445.82 sq mi) across its 17 municipalities.

== History ==
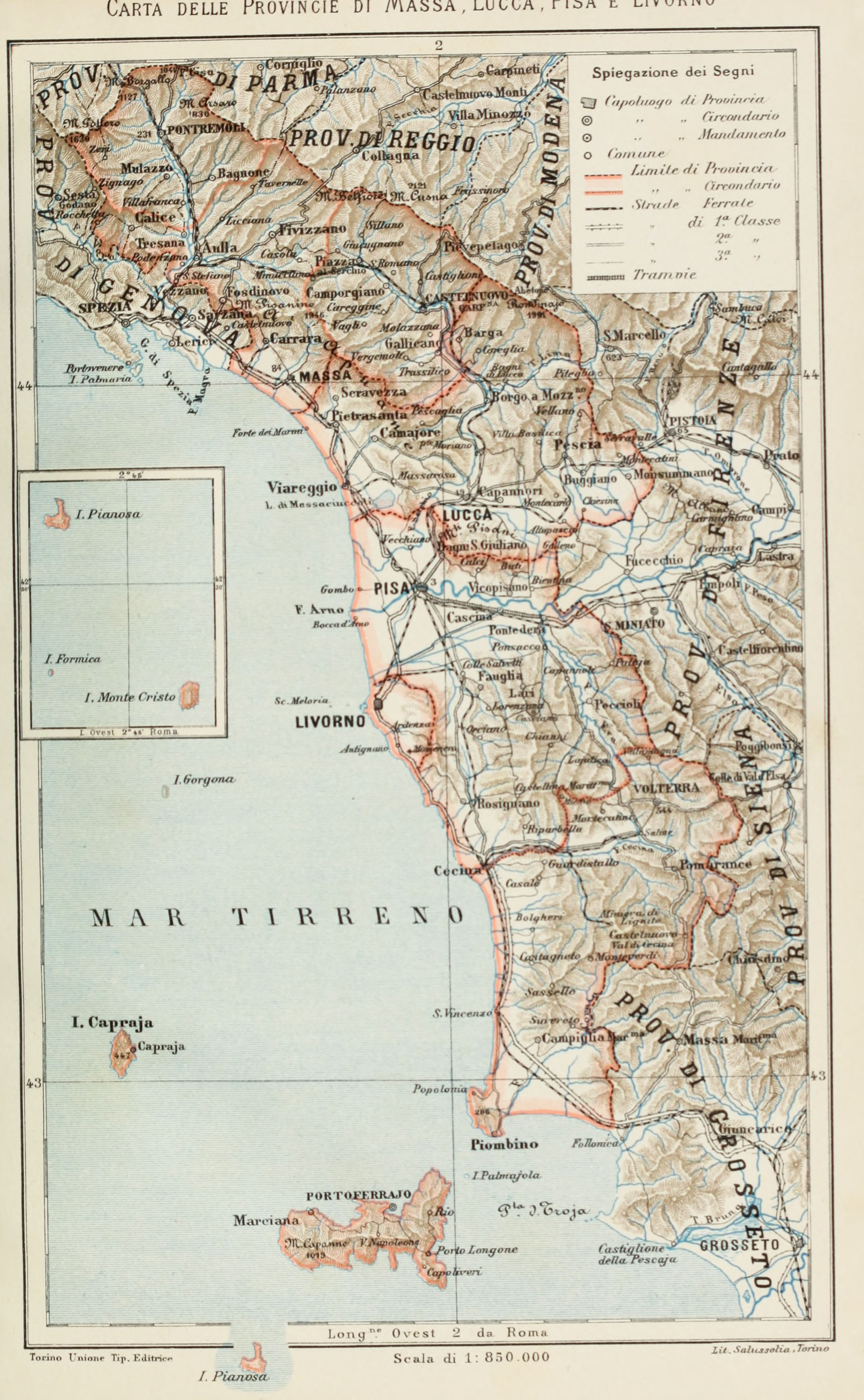
Historical map of provinces of Massa, Lucca, Pisa and Livorno (1896)

The province of "Massa e Carrara" was born in 1859 from the separation of the Lunigiana and the Garfagnana from the Duchy of Modena. Originally it was composed of three circondari: I° "Circondario of Massa and Carrara" (a group of seven districts divided in 14 municipalities), II° "Circondario" of Castelnuovo Garfagnana (four districts divided in 17 municipalities), III° "Circondario" of Pontremoli (three districts divided into six municipalities).

Until the census of 1861, the province appears as part of Compartimento territorial Modena, Reggio and Massa, but since the census of the population of 1871 it has been counted as part of Tuscany. Later, with the "Regio Decreto n. 1913 of September 2, 1923", the municipalities of Calice al Cornoviglio and Rocchetta Vara were detached from the province and added to the new province of La Spezia. In the same period ("Regio Decreto n.2490 of November 9, 1923") the 17 municipalities of the "Circondario" Castelnuovo Garfagnana were removed from Emilia and assigned to the province of Lucca, in order to compensate for the passage to the new province of Pistoia of all the municipalities of the Val di Nievole.

The province of Massa and Carrara was left crippled, waiting for a reorganization. In 1938, the municipalities of Carrara, Massa, and Montignoso joined and became the municipality of Apuania. In the same year, the industrial zone Apuana was instituted, including in relative Consortium C.Z.I.The municipalities of neighboring Versilia and the province assumed the name of a province of Apuania. In 1946, with decree Lieutenant one (Umberto II of Savoia) the new municipality of Apuania was formed, and the province (for error and/or historical ignorance) resumptions the denomination does not date from 1859 when it was "Massa and Carrara" but Massa. This was the name that had been designated to the city of Massa or Massa of Carrara from 1700 until the formation of the Kingdom of Italy (1860), to distinguish it from other homonymous cities.

In 2009, both decrees of 1938 and 1946 were abolished, restoring the old name.

== Government ==
=== Municipalities ===
The province has 17 municipalities:

- Aulla
- Bagnone
- Carrara
- Casola in Lunigiana
- Comano
- Filattiera
- Fivizzano
- Fosdinovo
- Licciana Nardi
- Massa
- Montignoso
- Mulazzo
- Podenzana
- Pontremoli
- Tresana
- Villafranca in Lunigiana
- Zeri

== Demographics ==
As of 2026, the population is 186,637, of which 48.9% are male, and 51.1% are female. Minors make up 12.2% of the population, and seniors make up 29.5%.

Historical population

Year	Pop.	±%
1861	105,699	—
1871	122,079	+15.5%
1881	132,959	+8.9%
1901	156,091	+17.4%
1911	171,719	+10.0%
1921	184,437	+7.4%
1931	194,384	+5.4%
1936	196,716	+1.2%

Year	Pop.	±%
1951	204,377	+3.9%
1961	202,981	−0.7%
1971	200,955	−1.0%
1981	203,530	+1.3%
1991	200,312	−1.6%
2001	197,652	−1.3%
2011	199,650	+1.0%
2021	188,483	−5.6%

Source: ISTAT

=== Immigration ===
As of 2025, immigrants make up 10.7% of the total population. The 5 largest foreign countries of birth are Romania, Morocco, Albania, Senegal, and France.

== Economy ==
The province's economical relevance, once mainly based on the production of the famous white Carrara marble, has now shifted to the importation and fabrication of blocks of marble and granite from all over the world.

== See also ==
- Carrara
- Duchy of Massa and Carrara
- Lunigiana
- Marble
- Massa
- Ducal Palace of Massa – home of the local authority
