= Gabriele I Malaspina =

Gabriele Malaspina (Fosdinovo ? - Fosdinovo, 1390) was an Italian nobleman. He was the son of Galeotto I Malaspina, he is remembered as the second marquis of Fosdinovo.

Malaspina of Fosdinovo's coat of arms

== Biography ==
Gabriele Malaspina was the son of the Marquis of Fosdinovo Galeotto I Malaspina (1355-1367), nephew of Spinetta Malaspina, Lord of Fosdinovo (1340-1352). When his father died, he and his brothers Spinetta II and Leonardo Malaspina were raised by their mother Argentina Grimaldi, a Genoese noblewoman already widowed by the Marquis Morello Malaspina of Giovagallo. In the name of his sons, Argentina brought a case before the Emperor Charles IV relatives against who, taking advantage of Galeotto's death, had stripped his family of lands and castles. On 18 April 1369 the emperor followed the appeal of Argentina by appointing three doctors and a lawyer from the Roman Curia to resolve the dispute. Returning to the possession of the ancestral territories, the sons Gabriele, Spinetta and Leonardo remained under the tutelage of Argentina until they reached an age that would allow them to govern.

From 1367, the eldest son Gabriele I Malaspina, at least formally, held the title of Marquis of Fosdinovo, whose Marquisate is enigmatically enveloped in fog. At his death, which occurred without legitimate heirs in 1390, his brother Spinetta returned to Fosdinovo to take care of his interests and to define with the other brother Leonardo the subdivision of the feud, which moreover had returned to include the domains previously assigned to his uncle Guglielmo, since his progeny were already extinct in 1374. This agreement was reached three years later, in 1393.
