= Spinetta II Malaspina =

Italian Noble

Spinetta Malaspina II, Duke of Gravina in Apulia (died 1398) was an Italian nobleman. Son of Galeotto I Malaspina, he was the third Marquis of Fosdinovo.

== Biography ==
Coat of arms of the House of Malaspina (Spino Fiorito)

Probably born at Fosdinovo, Spinetta II Malaspina was the son of the Marquis of Fosdinovo Galeotto I Malaspina (1355-1367) and a nephew of Spinetta Malaspina, Lord of Fosdinovo (1340-1352). On the death of his father, he and his brothers Gabriele and Leonardo Malaspina were raised by their mother Argentina Grimaldi, a Genoese noblewoman who had previously been the widow of the marquis Morello Malaspina of Giovagallo. In the name of his sons, he brought a case before Emperor Charles IV against relatives who, taking advantage of Galeotti's death, had stripped his family of lands and castles. On 18 April 1369 the emperor followed the appeal of Argentina by appointing three doctors and a lawyer from the Roman Curia to resolve the dispute.

Regaining the possession of their ancestral lands, the sons Gabriele, Spinetta, and Leonardo remained under the tutelage of Argentina until they reached an age that would allow them to govern. Of these, Spinetta and Leonardo stood out in particular, who were appointed knights on the occasion of the succession of Antonio and Bartolomeo II della Scala to the lordship of Verona in 1375. The two brothers lived in Verona until 1381, the year in which Antonio della Scala had his brother Bartolomeo killed, and then charged the murder to several courtiers, including the two Malaspina. Spinetta, banned from Verona along with his brother, became a "captain of fortune", fighting under different armies, including that of Duke Gian Galeazzo Visconti.

Since 1367, in the meantime, his eldest brother Gabriele I Malaspina had at least formally held the title of Marquis of Fosdinovo, whose Marquisate is enigmatically shrouded in fog. At Gabriele's death, which took place without legitimate heirs in 1390, Spinetta returned to Fosdinovo to take care of his interests and to define with his brother Leonardo the subdivision of the fief, which moreover had returned to include the domains previously assigned to his uncle Guglielmo, since his progeny was already extinct in 1374. The agreement was reached in 1393, the year in which the remaining sons of Galeotto divided the territory conquered by his great-uncle. On 25 March 1385, for having distinguished himself in the service of the Duchy of Anjou, the Duke of Gravina in Puglia obtained from Charles III of Naples the investiture of the title Spinetta II Malaspina and namesake of Spinetta the Great. He received the title of Marquis of Fosdinovo, which included Fosdinovo, Marciaso, Tendola, Posterla, Colla, villa di Bardine inferiore]], San Terenzo, Giucano, Pompilio, Cesina, Castelnuovo, Vallecchia, Gorasco and other minor villages. Leonardo I Malaspina (1393-1403) received the fief of Castel dell'Aquila, Gragnola), which included Viano, Reggio Emilia|Viano]], Casola, Gassano, Tenerano, Isolano, Monzone, Vinca, Equi, Ajola, Monte de' Bianchi, Ugliano, Montefiore, Argigliano, Codiponte di Cassano, Cortila, Prato-Alebbio, Sercognano, and Colognole, as well as the possessions held in Migliarina (district of Genoa, Lunense diocese), and property located in the territory of Massa and Montignoso.

Thus the family of Fosdinovo derives its origin from Spinetta, while the family of the marquesses of Castel dell'Aquila starts from Leonardo. The split between the two houses will be recomposed for the first time already in the second half of the fifteenth century, but only for a short time. Only in 1644, Gragnola will return for a long time to the jurisdiction of Fosdinovo, to remain there until the 1980s.

== Offspring ==
He married Giovanna Gambacorti and, secondly, after August 1390, Margherita Barbiano of the Counts of Cunio, who held the marquisate in the first years after her husband's death, for the tender age of her children. He had two children:

- Gabriele Malaspina (? - 1405), died young.
- Antonio Alberico I Malaspina (? - 9 April 1445), fourth Marquis of Fosdinovo (1398-1445) and Lord of Massa (1442-1445).
