= Castelnuovo Magra =

- Comune
- Comune di Castelnuovo Magra
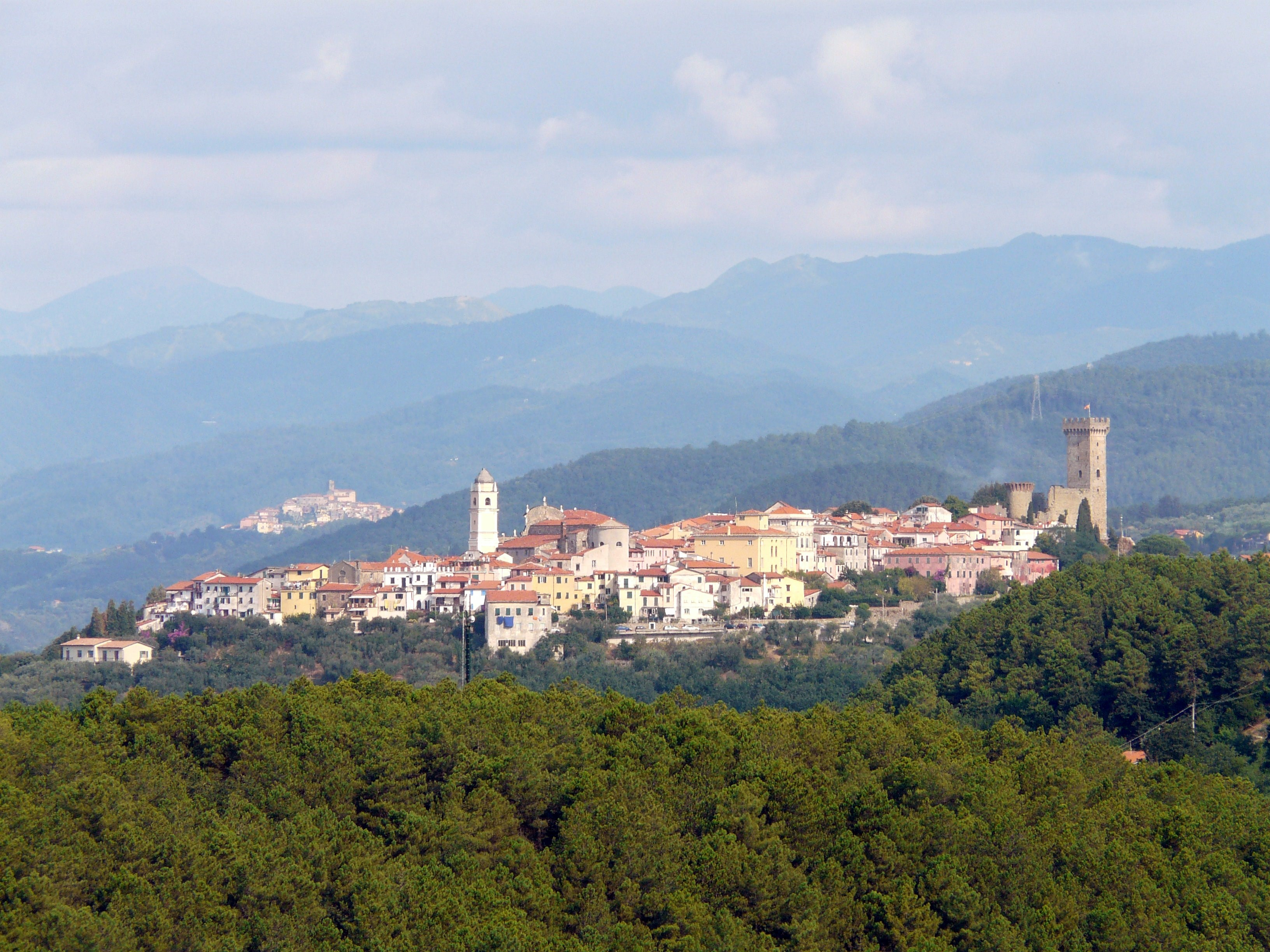
- Castelnuovo Magra

- Coat of arms

- Location within Italy Location within Liguria
- Coordinates: 44°6′N 10°1′E
- Country: Italy
- Region: Liguria
- Province: La Spezia (SP)
- Frazioni: Colombiera, Molicciara, Cerreta, Montecchio, Provasco, Vallecchia

Government
  - Mayor: Katia Cecchinelli

Area
  - Total: 14.98 km^{2} (5.78 sq mi)
- Elevation: 190 m (620 ft)

Population (1 January 2025)
  - Total: 8,244
  - Density: 550.3/km^{2} (1,425/sq mi)
- Demonym: Castelnovese(i)
- Time zone: UTC+1 (CET)
  - Summer (DST): UTC+2 (CEST)
- Postal code: 19033
- Dialing code: 0187
- Patron saint: San Fedele
- Saint day: 24 April
- Website: Official website

Castelnuovo Magra (Emilian: Castalnöu) is a commune in the Province of La Spezia, in the region of Liguria, located about 90 kilometres (56 mi) southeast of Genoa and about 15 kilometres (9 mi) east of La Spezia.

The municipality of Castelnuovo Magra contains the frazioni (subdivisions, mainly villages and hamlets) Colombiera, Molicciara, Cerreta, Montecchio, Provasco, Vallecchia.

Castelnuovo Magra borders the following municipalities: Fosdinovo, Ortonovo, Sarzana.

The local dialect (referred to in Italian as Lunigianese or similar names) constitutes a variety of Emilian rather than Ligurian.

== History ==
Roman presence is testified by ruins of a domus agricola (countryside estate) from imperial times. After the fall of the Western Roman Empire, it was held by the bishops of Luni; the name of the borough appears for the first time in a document from 1203.

The town was visited by Dante Alighieri on 6 October 1306, to end a long series of conflicts between the bishops of Luni and the Marquis Malaspina and opened a new course in local history.

The church of Santa Maria Maddalena in the town contains a Pieter Brueghel the Younger copy of The Crucifixion, believed to be a variation of an original by Pieter Bruegel the Elder. The artwork was believed stolen in a raid on 13 March 2019, but it was revealed that Italian police, tipped off about the possibility of the planned theft, had replaced the painting with a copy in a sting operation.
