= Medjugorje =

Medjugorje Međugorje
- Village
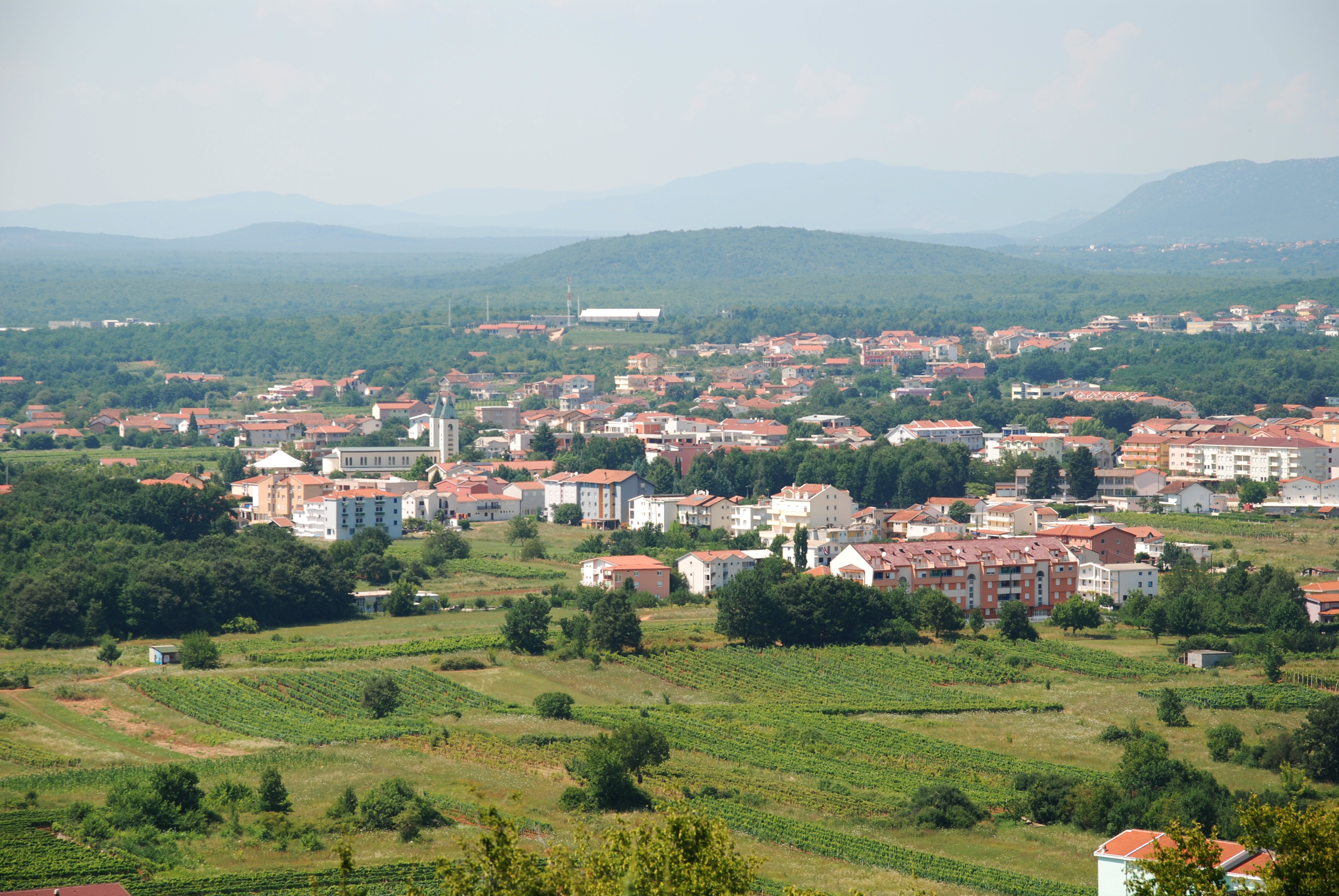
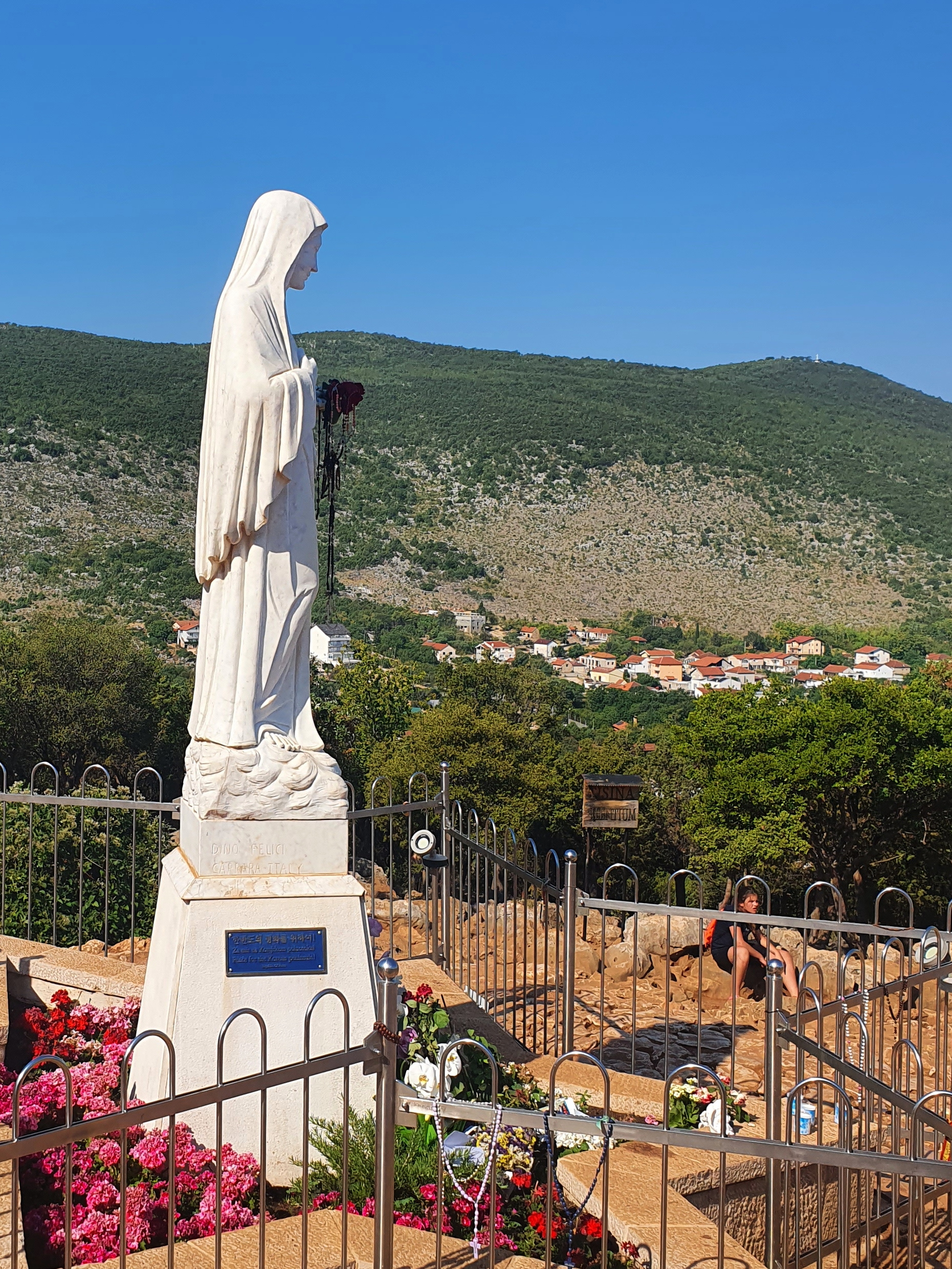
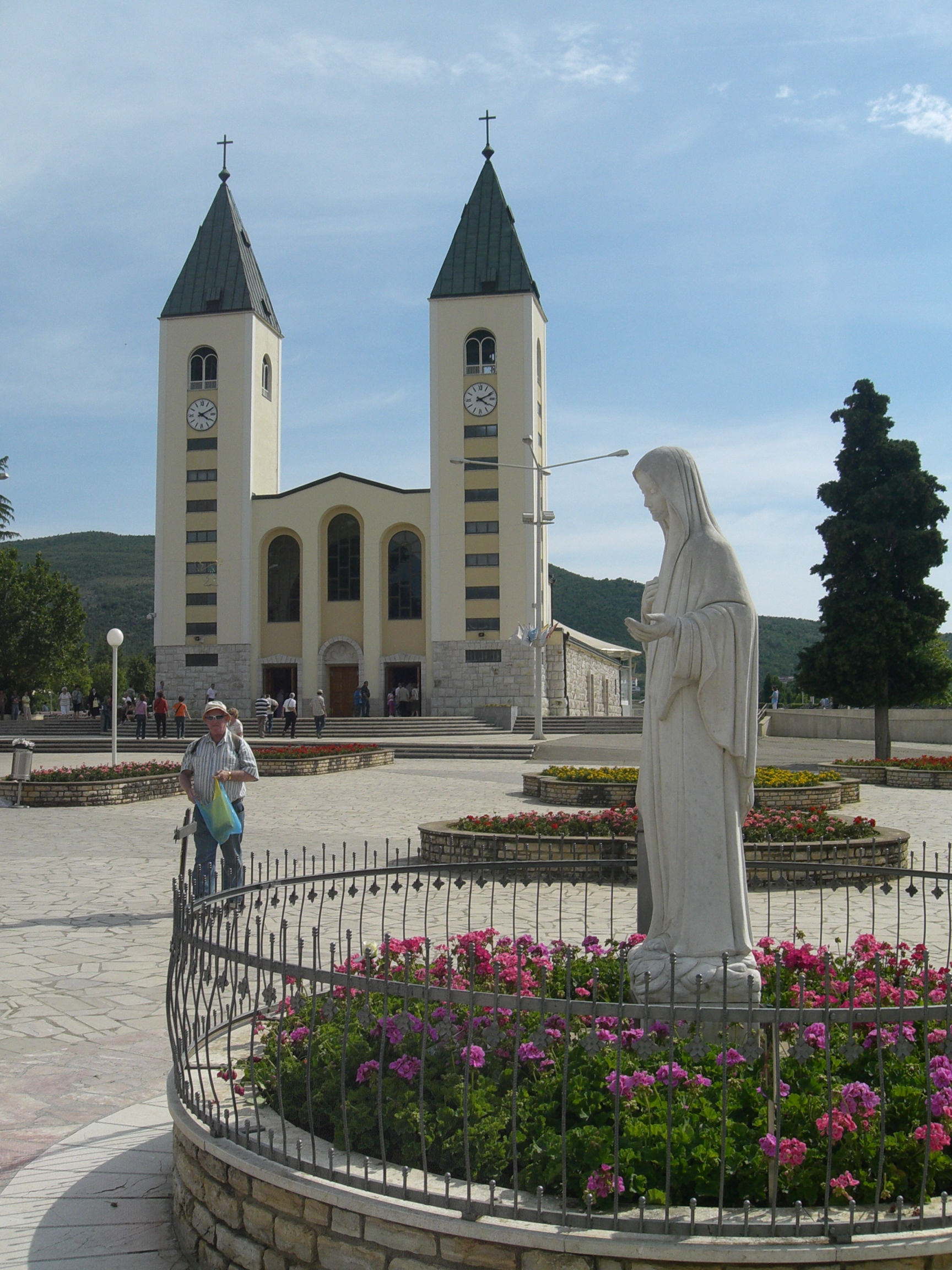
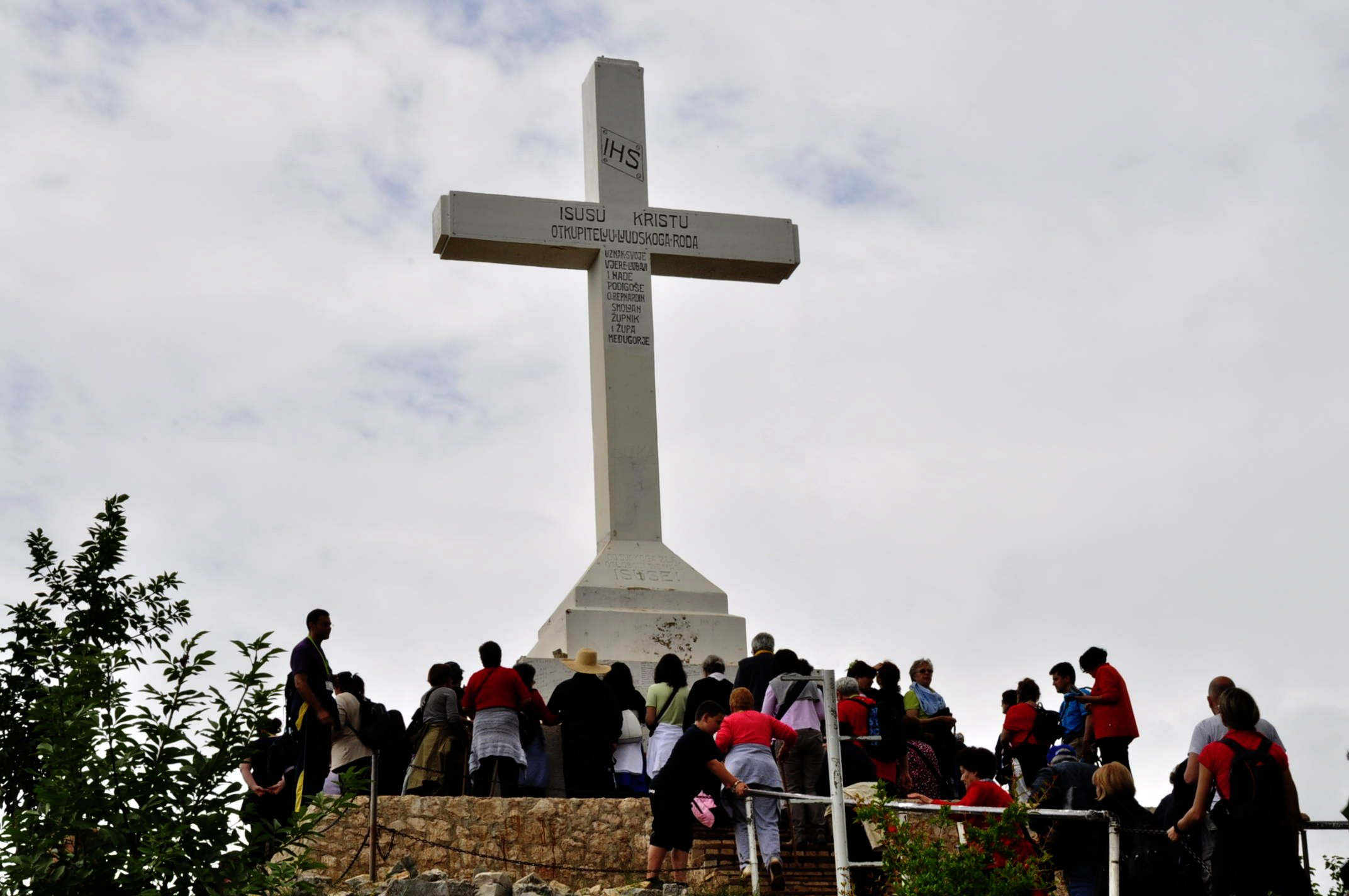

- Location of Međugorje within Bosnia and Herzegovina
- Coordinates: 43°12′N 17°41′E
- Country: Bosnia and Herzegovina
- Entity: Federation of Bosnia and Herzegovina
- Canton: Herzegovina-Neretva
- Municipality: Čitluk

Area
  - Total: 11.83 km^{2} (4.57 sq mi)

Population (2013)
  - Total: 2,265
  - Density: 191.5/km^{2} (495.9/sq mi)
- Time zone: UTC+1 (CET)
  - Summer (DST): UTC+2 (CEST)

Medjugorje (Note: "dj" was replaced by "đ" in Gaj's Latin alphabet, but continues to be used in the majority of English-language sources, either by choice or out of typographic limitation.) (Serbo-Croatian: Međugorje, pronounced [mêdʑuɡoːrje]) is a village in the municipality of Čitluk in Herzegovina-Neretva Canton of the Federation of Bosnia and Herzegovina, an entity of Bosnia and Herzegovina. Since 1981, it has become a popular site of Catholic pilgrimage due to Our Lady of Medjugorje, a purported series of apparitions of the Virgin Mary, mother of Jesus, to six local children, which some people believe are still happening to this day.

The name Medjugorje literally means "between mountains". At an altitude of 200 m (660 ft) above sea level it has a mild Mediterranean climate. The town consists of an ethnically homogeneous Croat population of 2,306. The Catholic parish includes four neighbouring villages: Bijakovići, Vionica, Miletina and Šurmanci. Since 2019, pilgrimages to Medjugorje have been authorized by the Vatican as long as there is no assumption the events are confirmed to have a supernatural origin. In September 2024, the Vatican formally endorsed "prudent devotion" to Virgin Mary at Medjugorje but made no declaration that the purported apparitions actually took place.

== History ==
Signpost to Medjugorje in August 1981

=== Early history ===
To the east of Medjugorje in the Neretva valley, the Serbian Orthodox Žitomislić Monastery has stood since 1566. After being destroyed in 1992 by a raiding party sent from Medjugorje, it has been reconstructed. Gravestones erected in the Middle Ages have remained to this day in the Catholic cemetery Groblje Srebrenica in the hamlet of Miletina as well as in the hamlet of Vionica. In the area of the cemetery in Miletina, structures from the Roman era stood, whose ruins have not yet been fully excavated.

=== 19th and early 20th centuries ===
Part of the Ottoman Empire until 1878, it became part of Austria-Hungary (War of 1878, Annexation 1908). In 1882 the railway line between Mostar and the Adriatic coast of Dalmatia was built, with a station in the hamlet of Šurmanci, through which the village gained access to the railway network.

The Catholic parish of Sveti Jakov ("Saint James") was erected in 1892 by the Bishop of Mostar Paškal Buconjić. The twelve-metre tall crucifix on the mountain called Križevac (Cross Mountain), completing the parish's Stations of the Cross (križni put), was completed in 1934.

=== The Medjugorje pilgrimage site ===
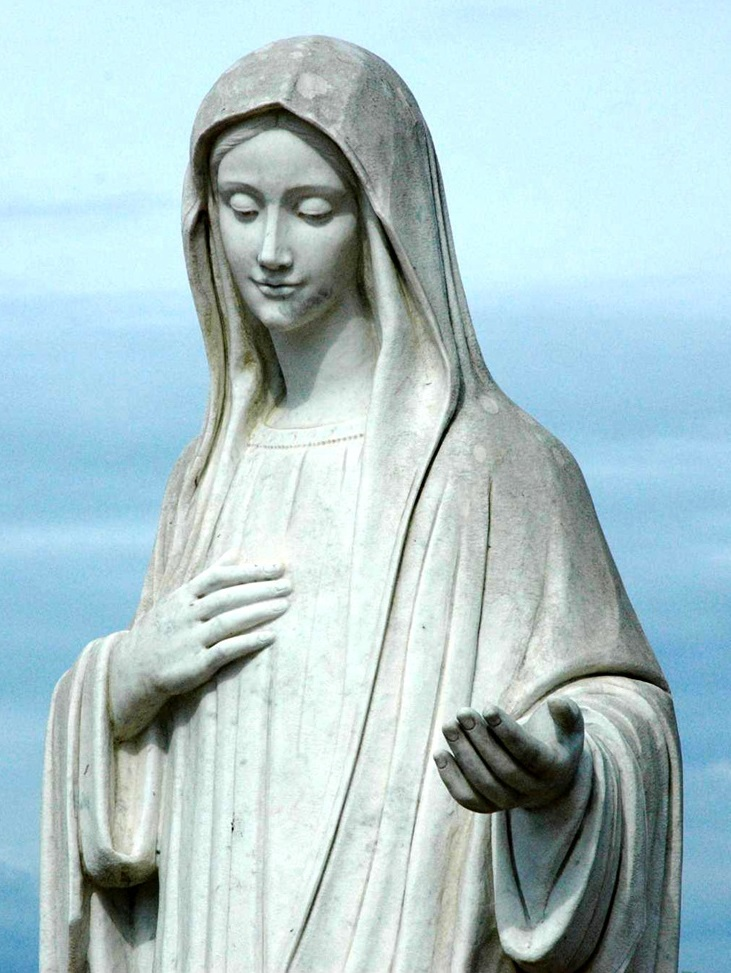
Statue of Our Lady in Medjugorje made an Italian sculptor Dino Felici

Queen of Peace is the title given to the apparition by those who believe that the Virgin Mary, mother of Jesus, has been appearing from 24 June 1981 until today to six children, now adults, in Medjugorje (then part of communist Yugoslavia). It was reported there that the Virgin Mary had said: "What I started in Fatima, I will complete in Medjugorje. My Heart will triumph". Since then, the Marian shrine of Medjugorje has become a popular pilgrimage site for Catholics, and has turned into Europe's third most important apparition site, where each year more than 1 million people visit. It has been estimated that 30 million pilgrims have come to Medjugorje since the reputed apparitions began in 1981.

In 1981 as soon as reports began of the Marian apparitions on Crnica hill in the Bijakovići hamlet, confrontations with Yugoslav state authorities began. Pilgrims were forbidden from coming, the pilgrim's donations were seized by the police and access to what was called the Apparition Hill was largely blocked. The parish priest of Medjugorje at that time, Father Jozo Zovko, was arrested and convicted of sedition. He had been ordered by the Communist Party headquarters in Mostar to stop the people from meeting on Podbrdo and to stop the evening Mass, but had refused.

In the last years before the 1992 breakup of Yugoslavia, travel of pilgrims was no longer hindered by the state.

=== Medjugorje during the Bosnian War ===
During the Bosnian War, Medjugorje remained in the hands of the Croatian Defence Council. By the Dayton Agreement in 1995, Medjugorje was incorporated into the Federation of Bosnia and Herzegovina, populated mostly by Bosniaks and Croats of Bosnia and Herzegovina. It lies within the Herzegovina-Neretva Canton, one of ten autonomous regions established so that no ethnic group could dominate the Federation.

On 2 April 1995, at the high point of conflict, Bishop Ratko Perić was kidnapped by Croat militiamen angry over his handling of an ongoing jurisdictional dispute and his stance on the apparitions; he was beaten, and taken to a chapel run by one of the Franciscans associated with Medjugorje, where he was held hostage for ten hours. At the initiative of the mayor of Mostar, he was freed without bloodshed, with the help of the United Nations Protection Force.

=== Development after the war ===
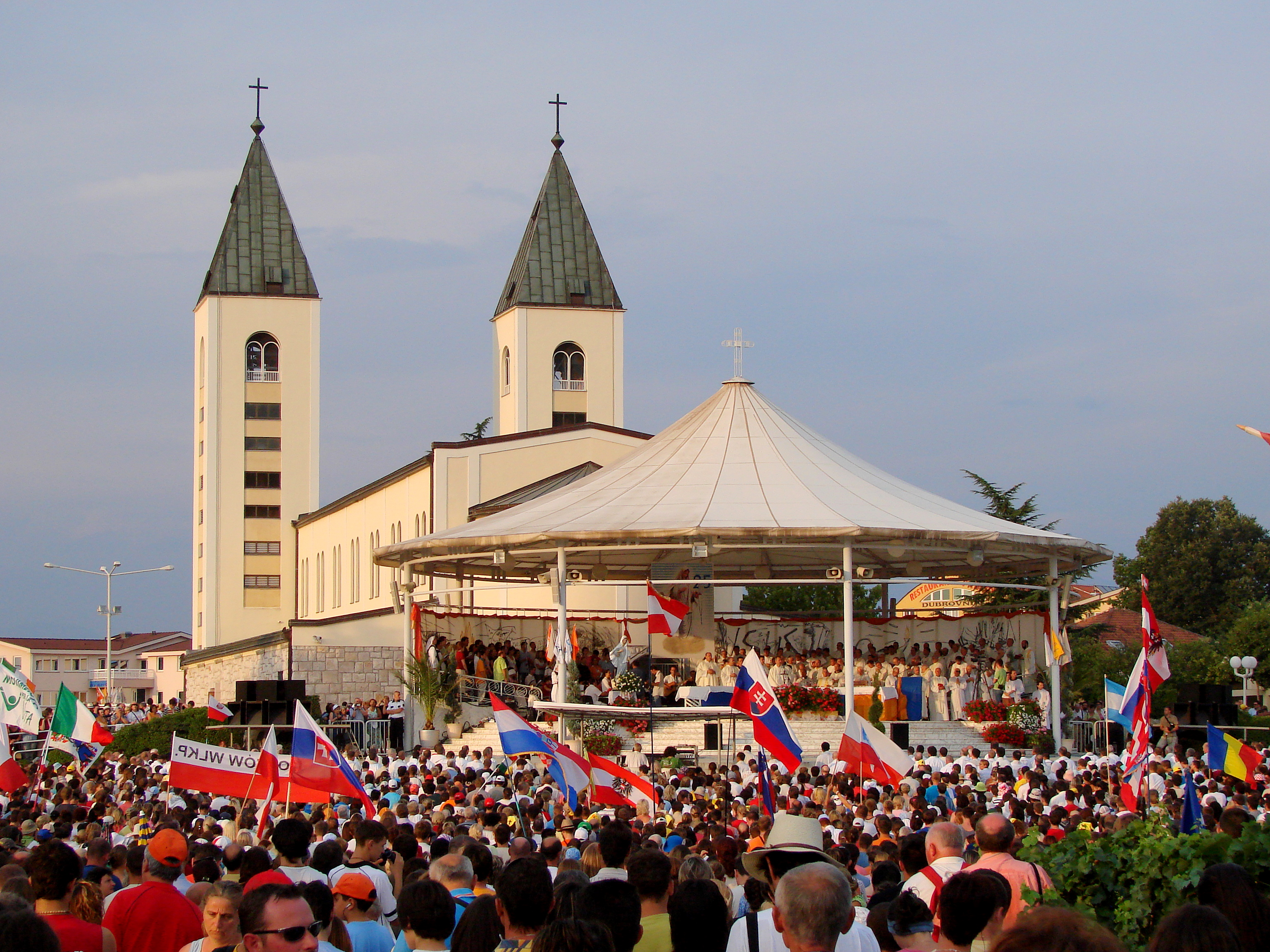
The Youth Festival of Medjugorje

The statue of Holy Mary - Queen of Peace, posted before church - is the first to greet a pilgrim

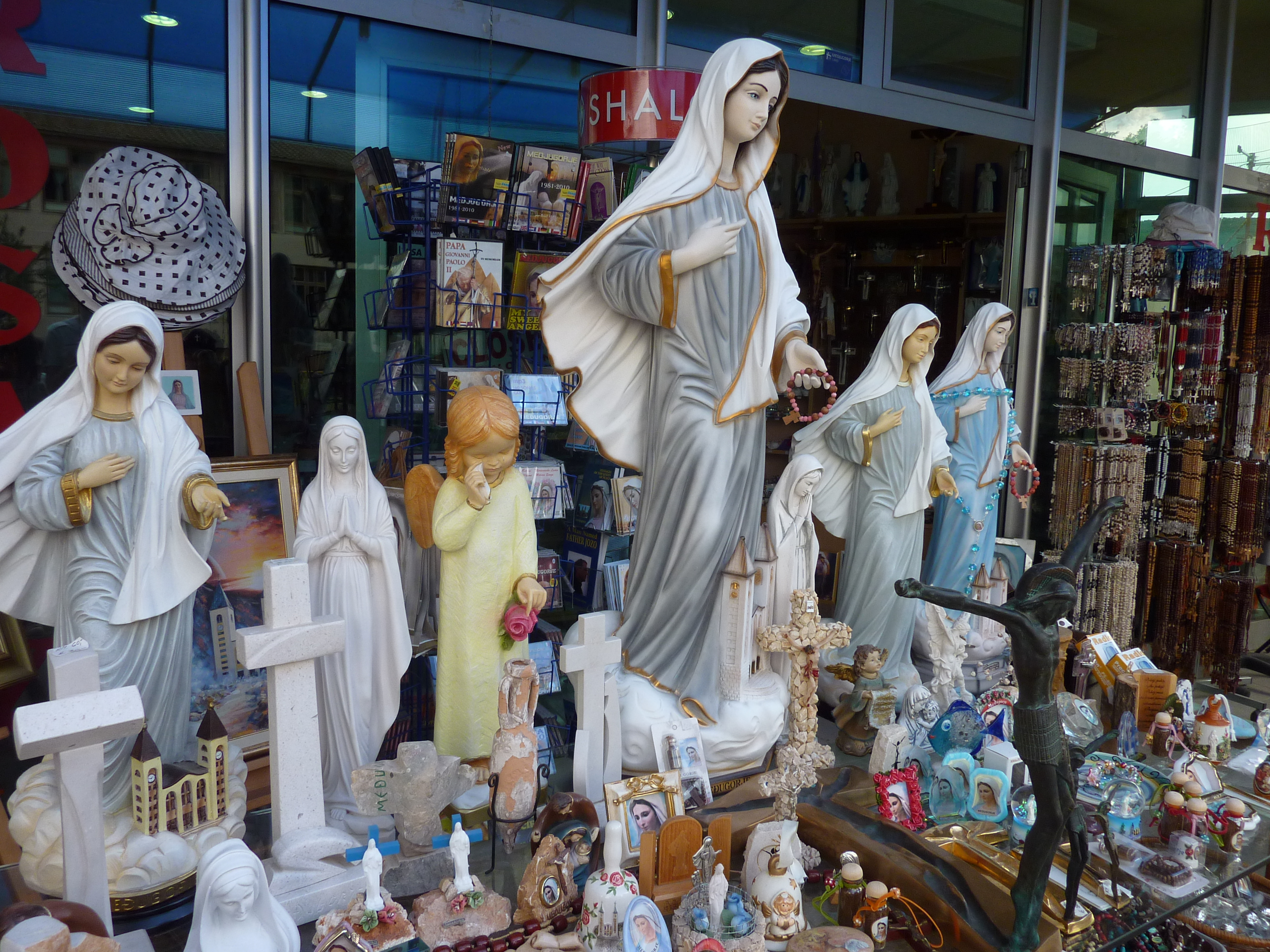
The aspect of religious commerce now quite common in the streets of Medjugorje village

The town and its environs boomed economically after the war. Over a thousand hotel and hostel beds are available for pilgrims to the town. With approximately one million visitors annually, Medjugorje has the most overnight stays in Bosnia and Herzegovina.

In 2017, Pope Francis appointed Archbishop Henryk Hoser of Praga (Warsaw) as a special envoy of the Holy See to Medjugorje, tasked with assessing its pastoral needs. By the end of 2017, Hoser had announced that the Vatican's position was in favor of organizing pilgrimages. In 2018, the Pope named Hoser as an apostolic visitor to Medjugorje, for "an undefined period and at nutum Sanctae Sedis" (at the disposal of the Holy See). The aim of this mission is "ensuring a stable and continuous accompaniment to the parish community of Medjugorje and to the faithful who go there as pilgrims, and whose needs require particular attention." In 2019, the Vatican officially authorized pilgrimages to Medjugorje as long as there is no assumption the events are confirmed to have a supernatural origin. The first Vatican-sanctioned pilgrimage then took place for five days from 2-6 August 2019. During the pilgrimage, approximately 60,000 young Catholics from 97 countries took part in the Medjugorje International Youth Festival. Fourteen archbishops and bishops and about 700 Catholic priests joined the festivities as well.

On 19 September 2024, the Holy See, based on a decree from the Cardinal Víctor Manuel Fernández, granted Medjugorje the status of 'Nulla Osta' (Nihil Obstat). This means that they encourage travel by believers and church pilgrimages to Medjugorje, but do not enter into the question of alleged Marian apparitions, and warn believers not to go to Medjugorje for 'alleged seers', but for the Virgin Mary, Queen of Peace; in other words, the Holy See offers only its approval to devotion to the Queen of Peace and to the experience of an authentic Catholic spirituality connected to Medjugorje.

The Vatican's document stated that the ruling was made because “many positive fruits have been noted in the midst of a spiritual experience, while negative and dangerous effects have not spread among the People of God.” In 2026 a statue of the Virgin Mary was defaced with black paint and the outdoor altar was set on fire. Near the site, a banner was found displayed on a fence with the names of the seers and a message written in Polish that said: “They are fraudsters, I have proof.” A Polish man was arrested in connection with the event.

== Demographics ==
According to the 2013 census, its population was 2,265.

Ethnicity in 2013
Ethnicity	Number	Percentage
Croats	2,232	98.5%
Bosniaks	4	0.2%
Serbs	3	0.1%
other/undeclared	26	1.1%
Total	2,265	100%

== Notable people ==
- Marin Čilić – tennis player, winner of the 2014 US Open
- Ivan Dodig – tennis player, winner in doubles of the 2015 French Open
- Andrija Stipanović – basketball player, Bosnia-Herzegovina national basketball team representative
- Vladimir Vasilj – former Croatian football player

== Gallery ==
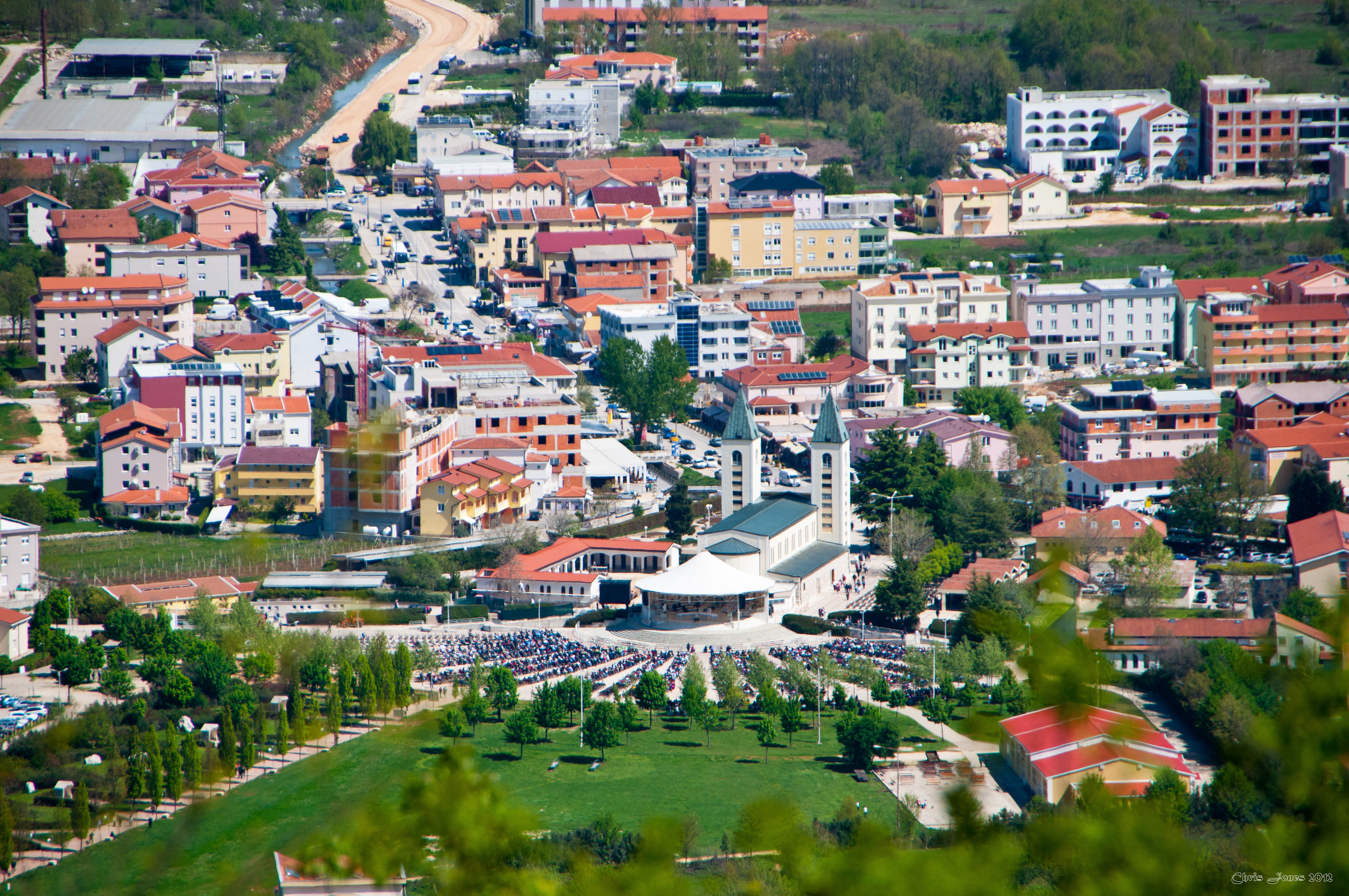
Panoramic of Medjugorje

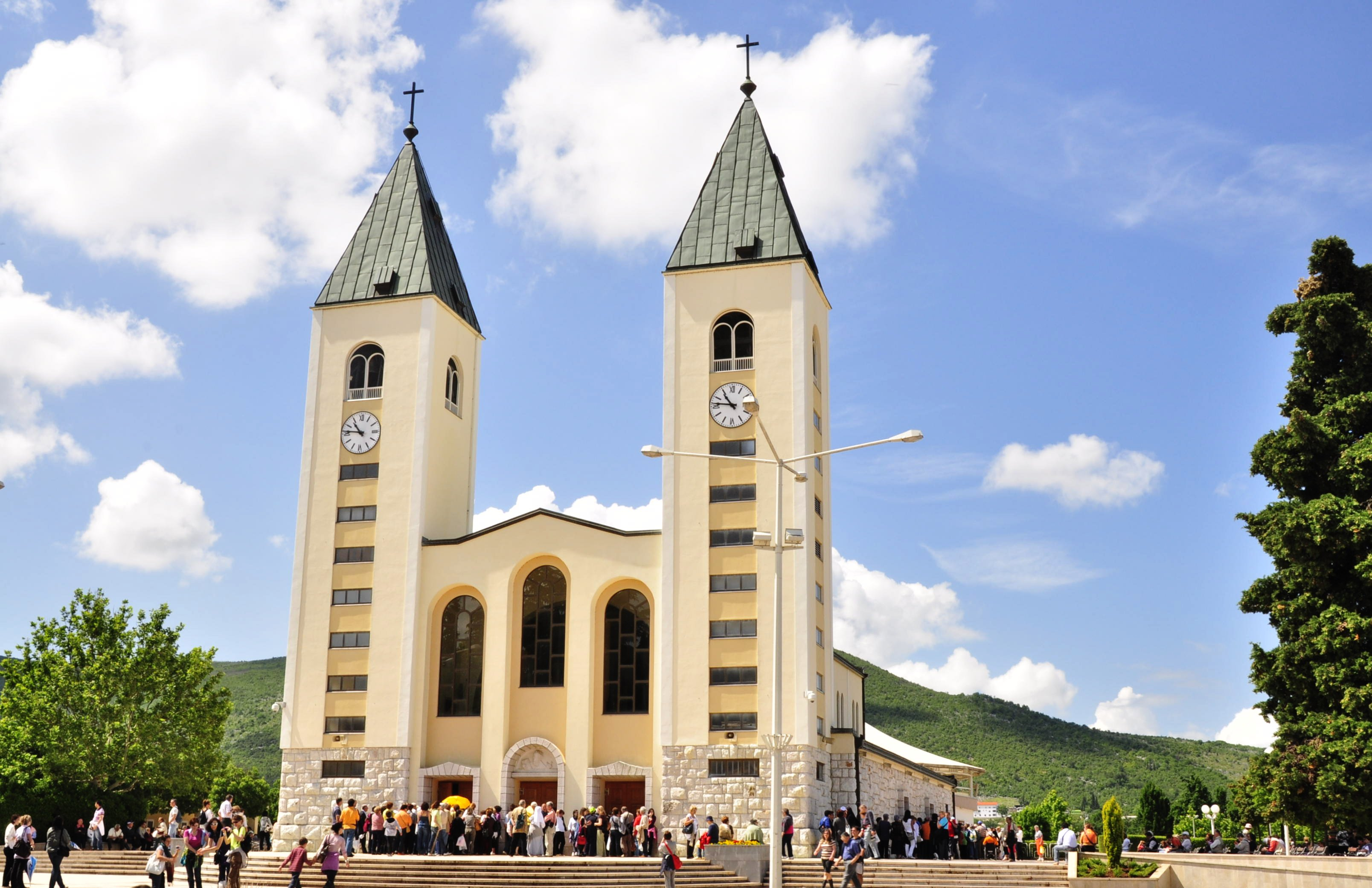
Saint James church

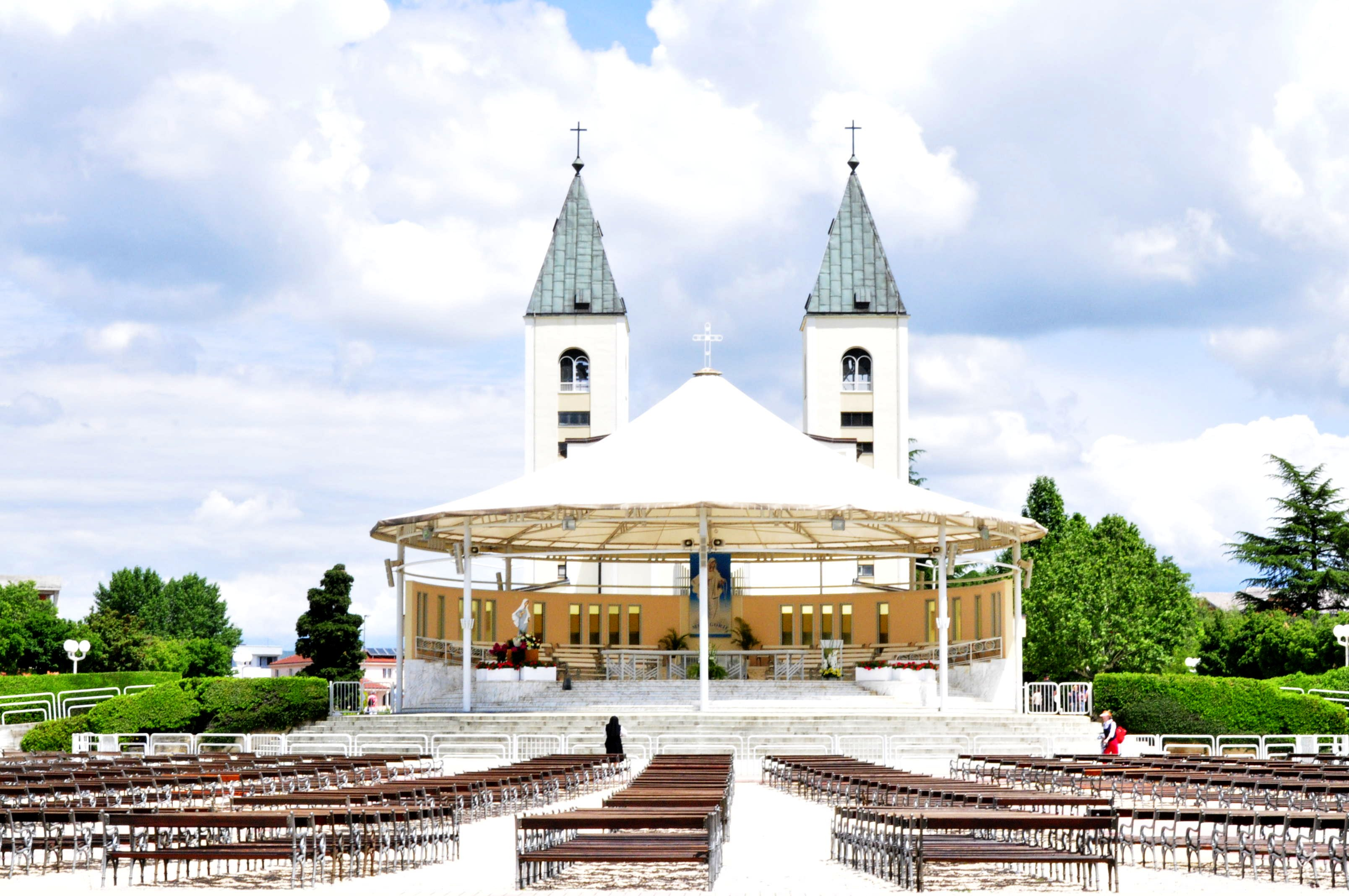
Outdoor altar of Saint James church

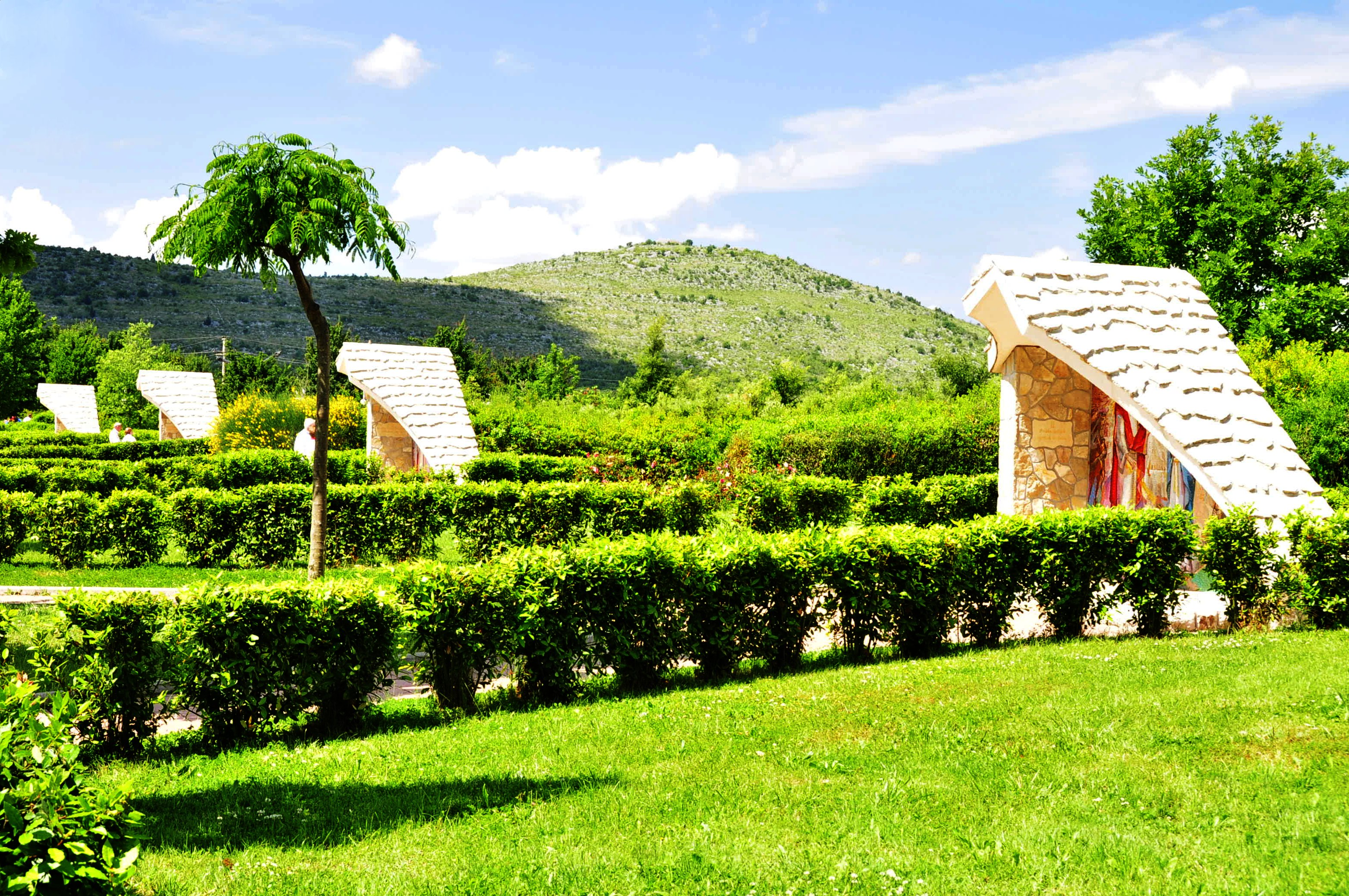
Mysteries of the Rosary behind the St. James Church

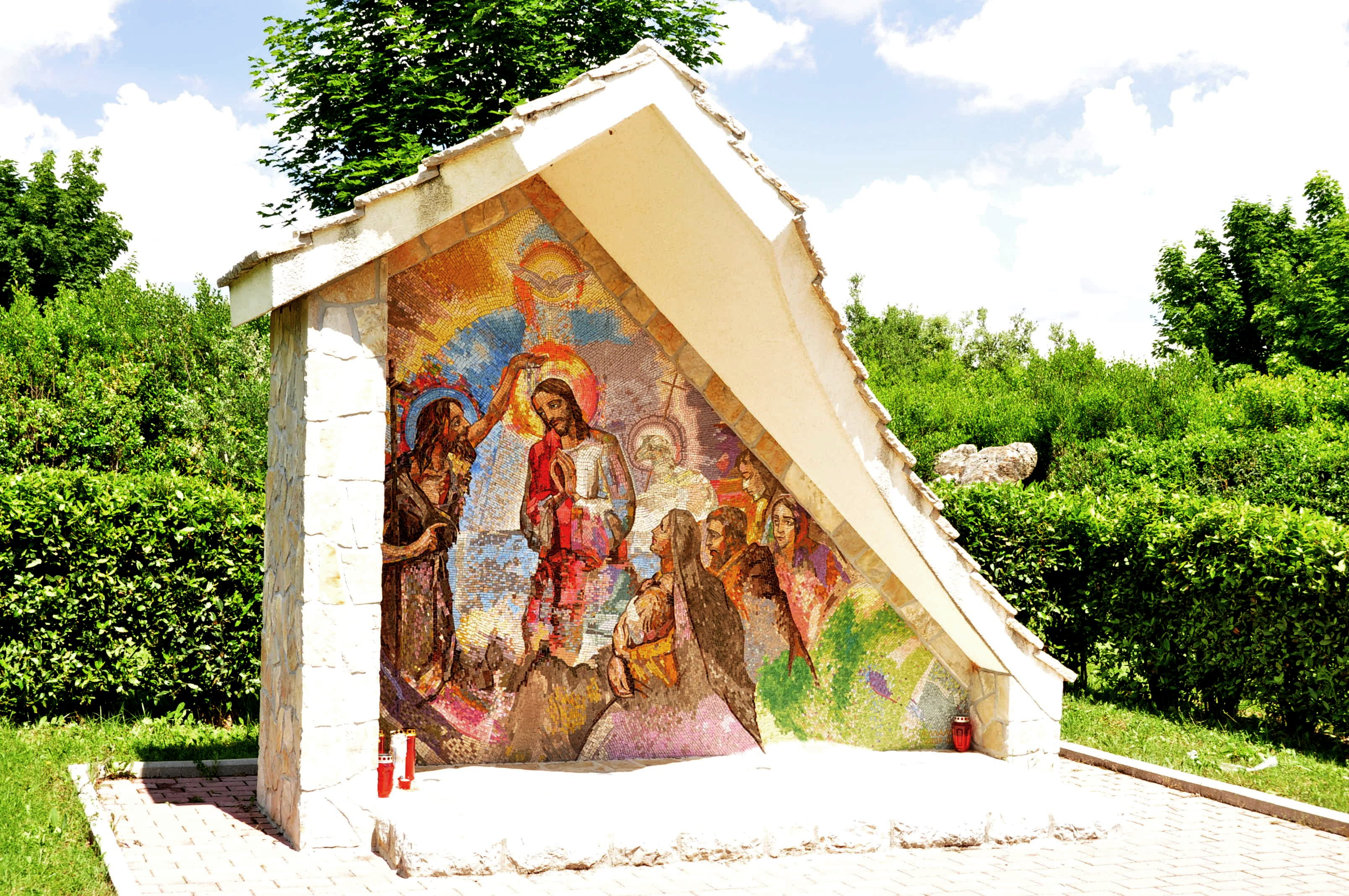
The baptism of Jesus

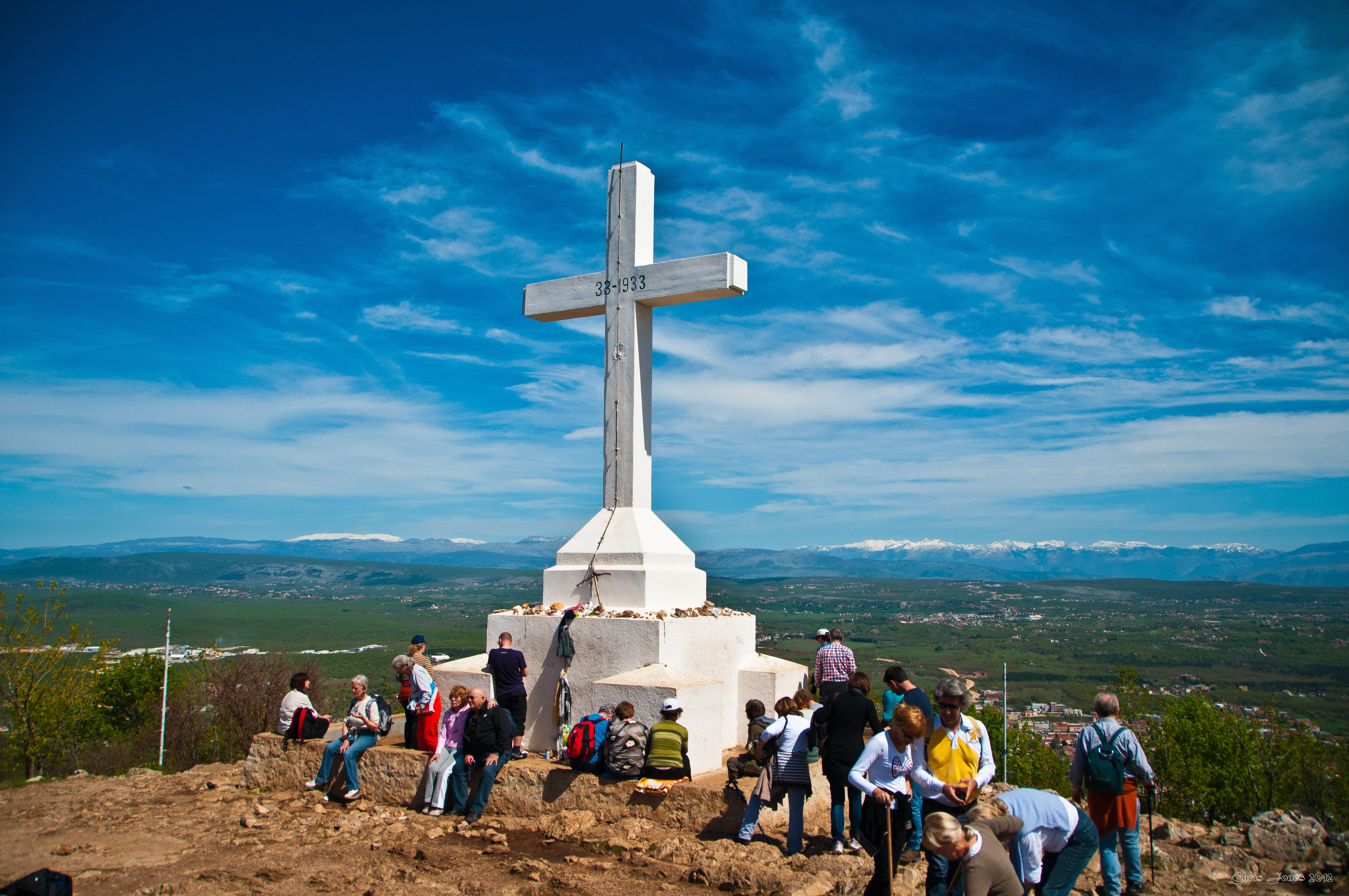
Cross at Križevac hill

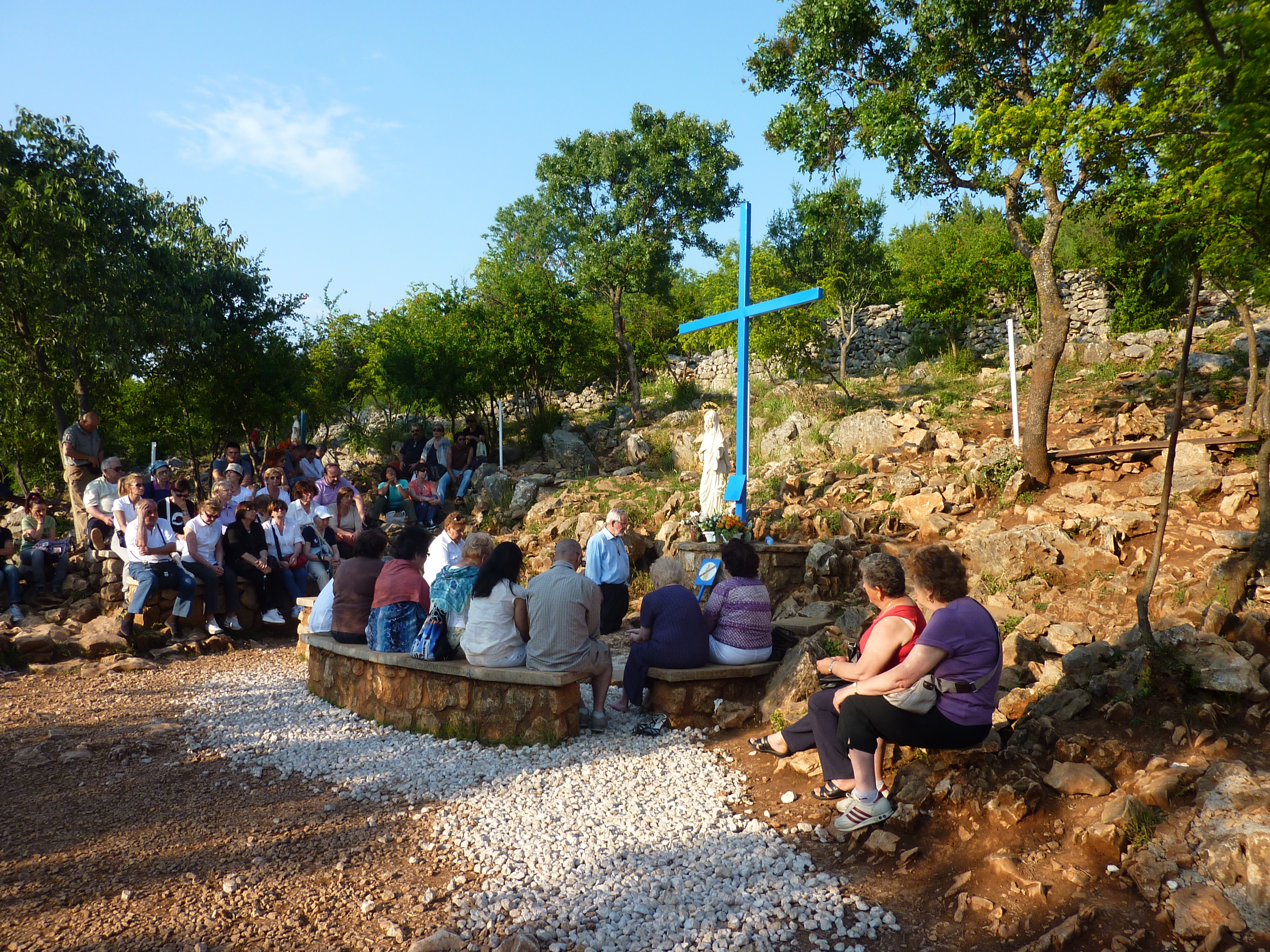
Blue cross at Podbrdo hill

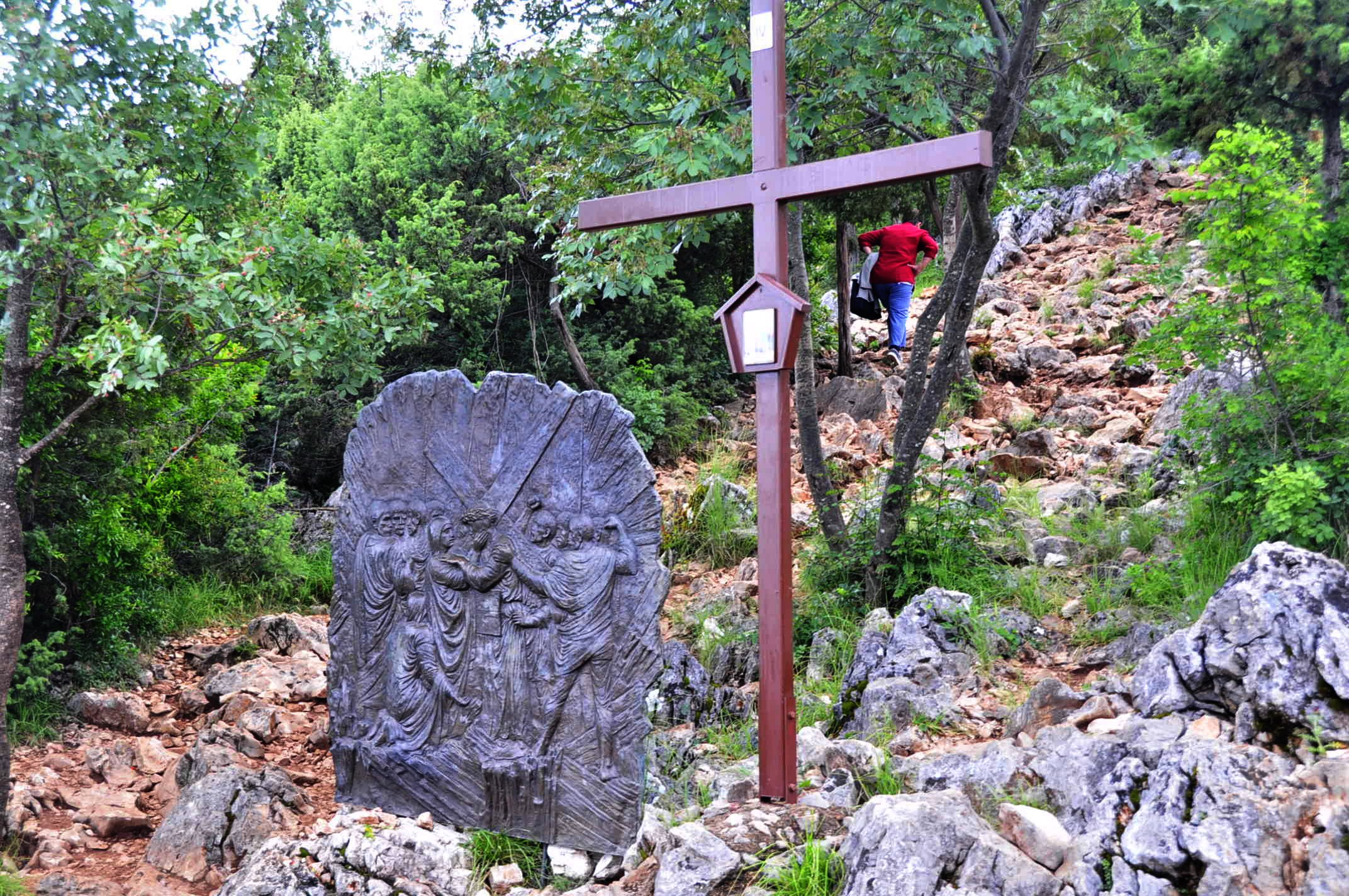
Stations of the Cross at Križevac hill

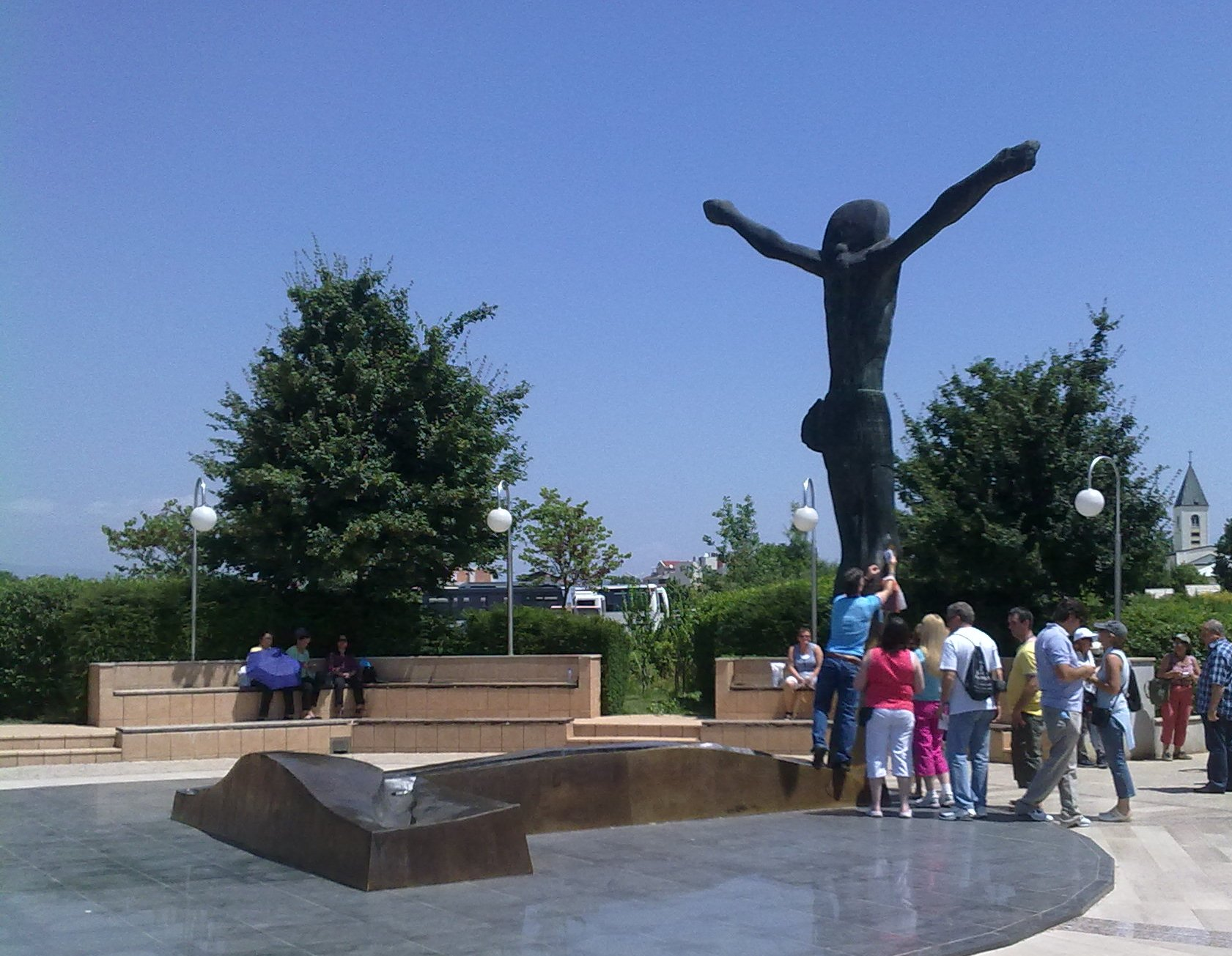
Jesus leaving the Cross, located behind the St. James Church

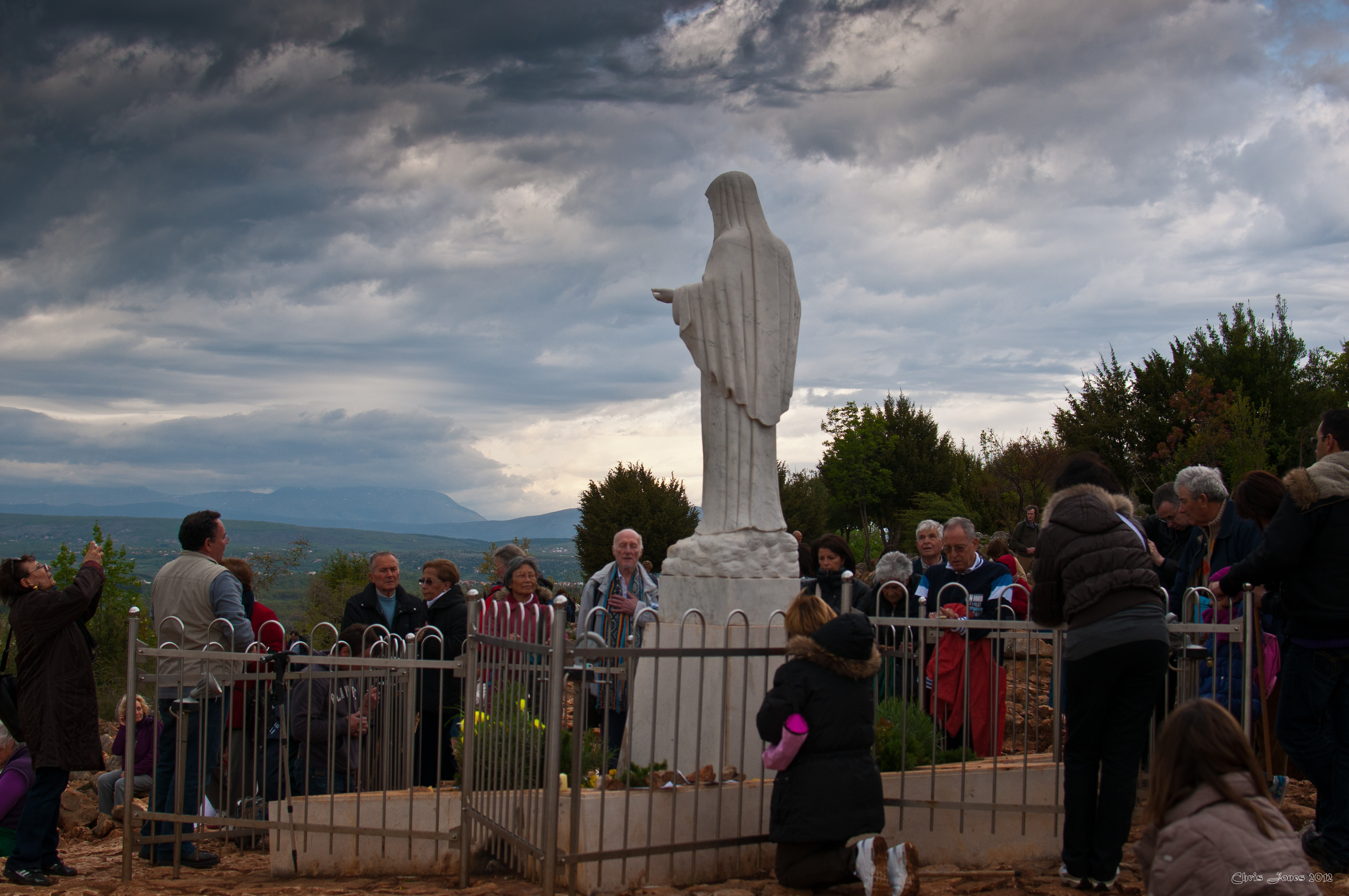
Our Lady statue at Podbrdo hill

== See also ==
- List of Christian pilgrimage sites

== Bibliography ==
- Belaj, Marijana (2012). Milijuni na putu - Antropologija hodočašća i sveto tlo Međugorja [The millions of a way - the anthropology of pilgrimage and the holy ground of Medjugorje] (in Croatian). Zagreb: Jasenski i Turk. ISBN 9789532225884.
- Ethnicity/National Affiliation, Religion and Mother Tongue (PDF). Sarajevo: Agency for Statistics of Bosnia and Herzegovina. 2019.
- Margry, Peter Jan (2023). "Conflict or Harmony? Religion and Politics: A Pas de Deux". In Köllner, Tobias; Testa, Alessandro (eds.). Politics of Religion: Authority, Creativity, Conflicts. Oxford: Oxford University Press. ISBN 9780198718383.
- Maunder, Chris (2016). Our Lady of the Nations: Apparitions of Mary in 20th-Century Catholic Europe. Münster: LIT Verlag Münster. ISBN 9783643912763.
