= Oratorio dei Bianchi, Fosdinovo =

Baroque in Fosdinovo

Coordinates: 44°08′03″N 10°01′07″E

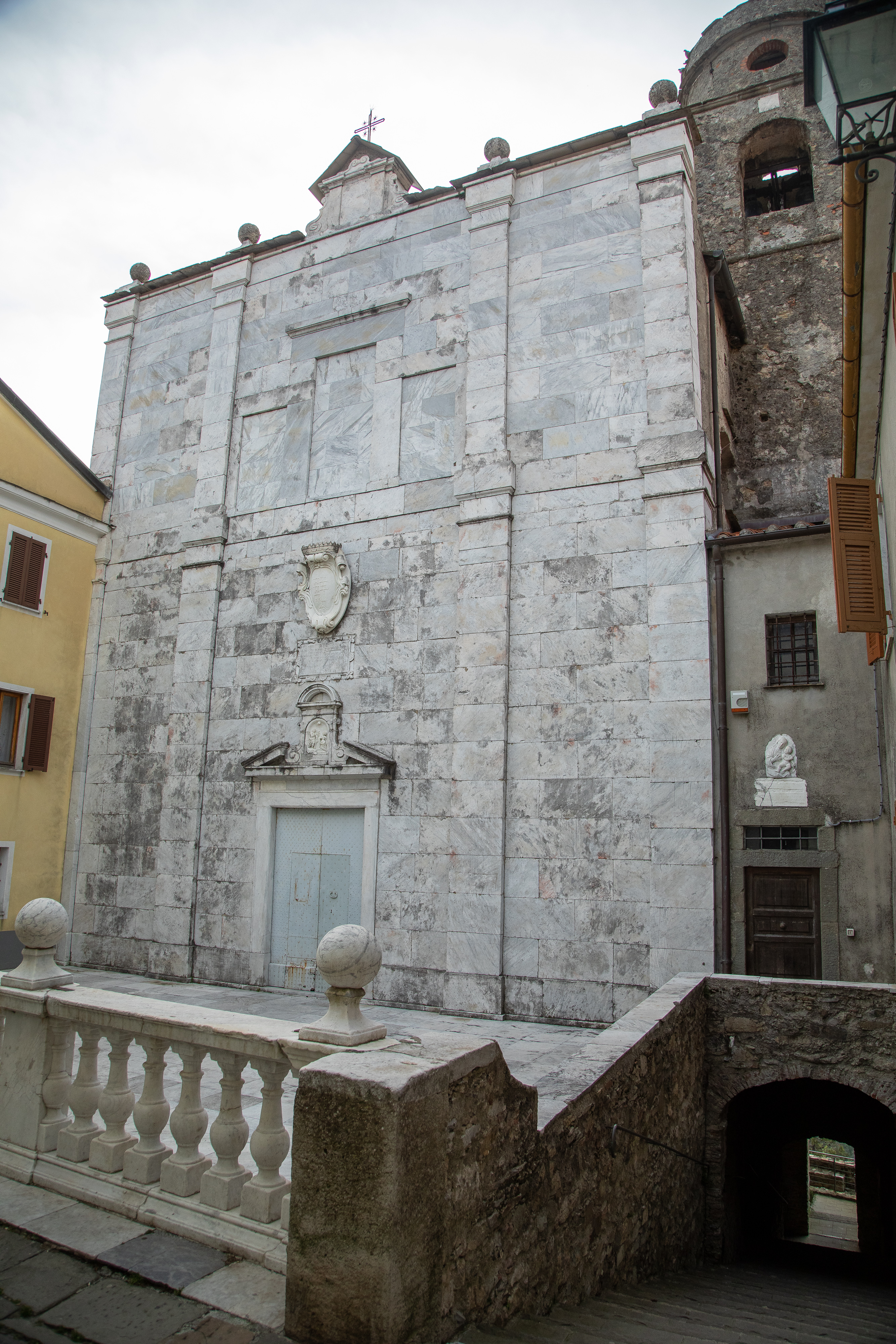

The Oratorio della Compagnia dei Bianchi or Compagnia della Santissima Annunziata is a Baroque-style, Roman Catholic oratory (chapel) located on Via Roma #9 in the mountain-top town of Fosdinovo, province of Massa and Carrara in the region Tuscany, Italy. After a fire destroyed the prior oratory, this white marble building was erected in 1648–1653.

== History and description ==
Originally the Flagellant, Franciscan-inspired lay confraternity of the Disciplinati (or dei Battuti), now known as dei Bianchi for their white robes had arrived to Fosdinovo at the dawn of the 16th century, patronized by the Marquis Gabriele II Malaspina (1467–1508) and the Franciscan friar Giovanni da Milano. They built their oratory near the center of town, and dedicated it to the Virgin of the Annunciation. The confraternity helped service the rites and burial of its members.

The oratory they built had acquired a 14th-century polychrome-painted wooden statue of the Virgin. However, this temple, which had been located closer to the parish church of San Remigio, was destroyed by a fire in 1501, and over a century later, the present oratory was erected under the patronage of Marquis Giacomo (Jacopo) Malaspina. The structure was roofed in 1651, and in 1653, burials from the old oratory site were moved here. the new oratory was decorated by the painter Domenico Utens, son of the Flemish painter Giusto Utens, but his work is now lost. In 1658, a new bell tower was erected under the designs of Mastro Antonio di Giovanni Bello from Bedizzano, a hamlet outside of Carrara. The new oratory was consecrated in 1673 as noted in the coat of arms on the facade.

In 1690, the church floor was paved with white Carrara marble tiles, and in 1697, the piazza in front of the church, along via Roma, was similarly paved with a balustrade added the next year. The white marble facade was built in 1666 by Mastro Giulio Pasciuti from Bedizzano, with the work still under the patronage of the then Marquis of Fosdinovo, Pasquale Malaspina. At the time, the cost of the 550 pieces of marble for the facade was 3329 lire.

The spacious chapel has a basilica layout, with a main altar hosting the revered wooden icon of the Virgin of the Annunciation, which survived the prior fire. Flanking this altar are statues of Mary's parents: Saints Anne and Joachim. The church also has statues of four prophets: Elias, Jeremiah, David, and Moses. The side altars have dedications to the Holy Family (altar of St Joseph); the Blessed Virgin of the Sorrows (Beata Vergine Addolorata) with a statue (1810) by Giuseppe Casoni; and Archangel Gabriel. There is also a wooden statue of a Dead Jesus (1646) by Giovanni Francesco Galeotti. The ceiling was frescoed in the 17th-century and underwent restoration after an earthquake in 1920. The choir has engraved oaken seats. The church has a 19th-century organ made by the Serassi family.

A survey in 1670 noted the church contained the following altars and altarpieces:

- St Francis Xavier by Camillo Pucci and commissioned by Giacomo II Malaspina (1610–1663)
- Altar of St Joseph by Bernardino Domenichelli
- Altar of St Charles (now St Antony or Padua) commissioned by Dr Carlo Benedettini
- Altar of St Sebastian commissioned by Sebastiano Milattieri
- Altar of the Holy Relics(now dedicated to the Beata Vergine Addolorata)
- Altar of St Dominic commissioned by the Marchesa Maria Grimaldi-Malaspina
