= Dino Felici =

Italian painter and sculptor (1931–2002)

- Born: 2 February 1931; Ortonovo, Kingdom of Italy, now Italy)
- Died: 5 May 2002 (aged 71); Carrara, Italy
- Resting place: Carrara
- Education: Carrara Marble School; Secondary Art School
- Years active: 1945-2002
- Known for: sculptor, painter
- Notable work: Marble monument to the Queen of Peace in Međugorje (1986); Monument to the Queen of Peace on Podbrdo (2001)
- Style: romantism
- Predecessor: Eumene Felici
- Successor: Mirco Felici
- Spouse: ()
- Children: Mirco Felici

Dino Felici (* 1931 Ortonovo, † 2002 Carrara) was an Italian painter and sculptor. He is known for his statues of Mary, Queen of Peace, in Međugorje.

== Biography ==
=== Dino & Mirco Felici ===
Dino was born in 1931 into the well-known Felici family of sculptors, in the town of Ortonovo in Tuscany, northwestern Italy. His father was also a sculptor, while his grandfather—also from Ortonovo—was a stonemason.

Dino began his work in sculpture at the age of 14. After attending a School for the processing of Carrara marble, he graduated from an Art high school. Initially, he worked alongside his father, Eumene; in 1967, he established his own company, "Dino Felici," which continues to operate today in Carrara, Tuscany, under the name "Dino Felici Di Mirco Felici (MS)."

His work is now carried on by his son, Mirko Felici, who was born into this traditional family of sculptors: his father and grandfather were sculptors, and his great-grandfather was a stonemason. Despite having a different life path and different plans, Mirko remained closely connected throughout his life to his father and the artistic vision that brought the family renown across the globe and on every continent.

Mirko had initially pursued his youthful dreams by enrolling in the Faculty of Economics and Banking at the University of Siena, from which he successfully graduated.

He went on to work for Sogei, an information and communication technology company serving the Ministry of Finance. In the late 1990s, he returned to Carrara to work alongside his father in the historic family workshop. He started a business trading in marble and granite with a partner, but sold his shares immediately after his father fell ill.

Following his father's death in 2002, his son Mirko took over the family business. Although his father is physically gone, his spirit can still be felt in that workshop on Via Aurelia. His legacy represents far more than just a wealth of plaster casts and statues; Dino's life force and his soul with inspirations that seem never to have left the workshop remain palpable.

=== Works ===
This is the third Felici's statue of Virgin Mary, but earliest in terms of origin, dating from 1981.

Dino Felici is world-famous for his numerous works commissioned by private and public users, but especially for his sculpting of statues of Mary in Medjugorje: the first in 1986, which is located in the churchyard in front of the shrine; the second in 2001 on the top of the Hill of Apparitions (Podbrdo). The third statue is located in the private chapel of one of the Medjugorje visionaries. This statue of his on Podbrdo was made according to the exact description of the visionaries. Their statements were recorded in detail by the Franciscan Provincial Janko Bubalo in his book on Medjugorje in 1985. This statue became so popular between pilgrims that it became, so to speak, a symbol and logo of the Medjugorje events. Medjugorje's Radio "Peace" expressed itself about it in an Italian broadcast as follows:

In questo momento

Quanto è bella la statua della Madonna, Regina della Pace. Con il suo sguardo dolce e la mano aperta sembra accogliere ogni pellegrino che sale sulla Collina delle Apparizioni.

At this moment

How beautiful the statue of Our Lady, Queen of Peace, is. With her gentle appearance and open hand, she seems to welcome every pilgrim who climbs the Hill of Apparitions.

The statue of Queen of Peace in front of the parochial St. Jacob Church was made in 1986 and placed in its place in 1987.

Statue der Königin des Friedens

Die Statue ist sozusagen die erste, der die Pilger begegnen, bevor sie zur Kirche kommen. Maria empfängt uns, nimmt uns an der Hand und führt uns zu Jesus.
Hier versammeln sich viele Gläubige, um der Muttergottes nahe zu sein und ihre Anliegen und Gebete vorzubringen. Sie ist ein "Mittelpunkt" auf dem Kirchvorplatz.

Statue of the Queen of Peace

The statue is, in a sense, the first thing pilgrims encounter before reaching the church. Mary welcomes us, takes us by the hand, and leads us to Jesus.
Many of the believers gather here to be close to the Mother of God and to present their intentions and prayers. It is a "central point" on the church square.

For pilgrims, encountering the statue of Mary signifies it a spiritual encounter with Mary herself, and through her, with her Son, Jesus Christ.Although the artist endeavored to capture in marble the details described in the book by Janko Bubalo, certain elements are entirely his own invention—which is perfectly understandable, as reading or hearing about something is not the same as seeing it firsthand. It is therefore not surprising that the face of this magnificent statue of the Queen of Peace of Medjugorje bears a striking resemblance to a figure in a drawing by the Italian polymath Leonardo da Vinci, created sometime between 1504 and 1506.

== Death and Legacy ==
=== Death ===
He died in 2002 in Carrara from the effects of amyotrophic lateral sclerosis (ALS).

=== Awards ===
The "Dino Felici Award" is named after him and is presented annually in his hometown of Marina di Carrara in Province of Massa-Carrara, where the artist lived for 40 years.

The "Dino Felici Association" was also established to preserve his memory and honor individuals who have distinguished themselves in the fields of culture, humanitarian work, sports, or science. The association also promotes scientific research aimed at improving the treatment of ALS—the disease that caused Dino's death.

Recipients of the award include Gianluigi Buffon, Augusto Binelli, Tilde Corsi, Ron, Alessandra Carpino Boeri, and Mario Melazzini. The 2010 award was presented to the "Vialli-Mauro" Foundation, and the 2011 award to the "Stefano Borgonovo" Foundation.

In 2013, the award was presented to Ernesto Olivero, who contributed to research into the insidious disease amyotrophic lateral sclerosis (ALS), from which Dino Felici suffered and died.

=== Legacy ===
Many people make a pilgrimage to the statue of Mary at Podbrdo

Felici gained fame for his marble statues of Queen of Peaca – Our Lady of Medjugorje

"Catchlight" says about his statue "Queen of Peace":

"The Queen of Peace statue placed in the grounds of St James church at Medjugorje, the Marian pilgrimage location in Bosnia Herzegovina, was created by the Italian sculptor Dino Felici. Erected in 1987, it stands just over seven feet in height and is a focal point of prayer for the millions of pilgrims who visit the village of claimed apparitions of the Virgin Mary."

His son, Mirko, says however of his father and his statues:

"My father was a sculptor, known for his work not only in Carrara but throughout the world. He was self-taught, even though he came from a family of sculptors.

He created primarily sacred art and architectural elements for clients across five continents.

He was a man of deep faith who viewed his work as a spiritual service to others.

Today, my father is perhaps best remembered for three marble statues in Medjugorje. Regarding the statues of the Queen of Peace, he was asked to embody—in the figure of the Virgin Mary—both the mystery of the 'fullness of grace' and the 'tenderness of a Mother'."

Like the one on Apparition Hill (Podbrdo), this statue stands in an open space, allowing it to be viewed from all sides. The footage here is accompanied by the ringing of bells from the parish Church of St. James, along with some insightful information about its relatively unknown creator:

A szobor neve "Béke Királynője"

Az alkotója Dino Felici olasz szobrász, és 1987-ben állították fel. A templom előtti tér egyik legfontosabb imahelye; a zarándokok gyakran virágot helyeznek el előtte és rózsafüzért imádkoznak.

The statue is called "Queen of Peace."

It was created by the Italian sculptor Dino Felici and was installed in 1987. It is one of the most significant places of prayer in the square in front of the church; pilgrims often leave flowers before it and pray the Rosary.

== See also ==
- Medjugorje
- Podbrdo
- Carmelo Puzzolo
