= Galeotto I Malaspina =

Galeotto Malaspina (Fosdinovo ? - Fosdinovo, 15 March 1367 ) was an Italian judge and nobleman. He was the son of Azzolino II Malaspina and grandson of Spinetta Malaspina, he is remembered to be the first Marquis of Fosdinovo.

== Biography ==
Galeotto Malaspina was the son of Azzolino II Malaspina, brother of Spinetta Malaspina, Lord of Fosdinovo (1340-1352). The uncle, having no legitimate heirs, indicated as his successors Gabriele, Galeotto and Guglielmo Malaspina, sons of Azzolino. Thus, when Spinetta died in 1352, the fiefdom of Fosdinovo passed into their hands and the three brothers obtained the title of Lords of Fosdinovo, Marciaso, Comano and the Terre dei Bianchi. In 1355 their title changed, as Emperor Charles IV of Luxembourg, while travelling to Rome, decided to raise the fiefdom of Fosdinovo to Marquisate, investing its masters as marquises.

In 1359 Gabriele (bishop of Luni) died, leaving fiefdom and title to the two remaining brothers who shared the lands. In particular, Galeotto gained control over the Marquisate of Fosdinovo, because of this, he is considered the first Marquis of Fosdinovo, since he was the first to be able to reign over Fosdinovo as a marquis and in an unchallenged way, starting from 1361. Galeotto exercised the position of judge in Verona, he was a Knight and died in 1367 in Fosdinovo. There he still lies, in the funeral monument built immediately after his death and placed in the Church of San Remigio.

== Offspring ==
Galeotto I married Argentina Grimaldi, a Genoese noblewoman, already the widow of the Marquis Morello Malaspina of Giovagallo, from whom she had three children:

- Gabriele I Malaspina (?- 1390), second marquis of Fosdinovo (1367-1390)
- Spinetta II Malaspina (?- 1398), knight, Duke of Gravina in Puglia and third marquis of Fosdinovo (1393-1398)
- Leonardo I Malaspina (?- 13 July 1403), knight and first marquis of Castel dell'Aquila (Gragnola) (1393-1403)

== Funeral monument to Galeotto Malaspina ==
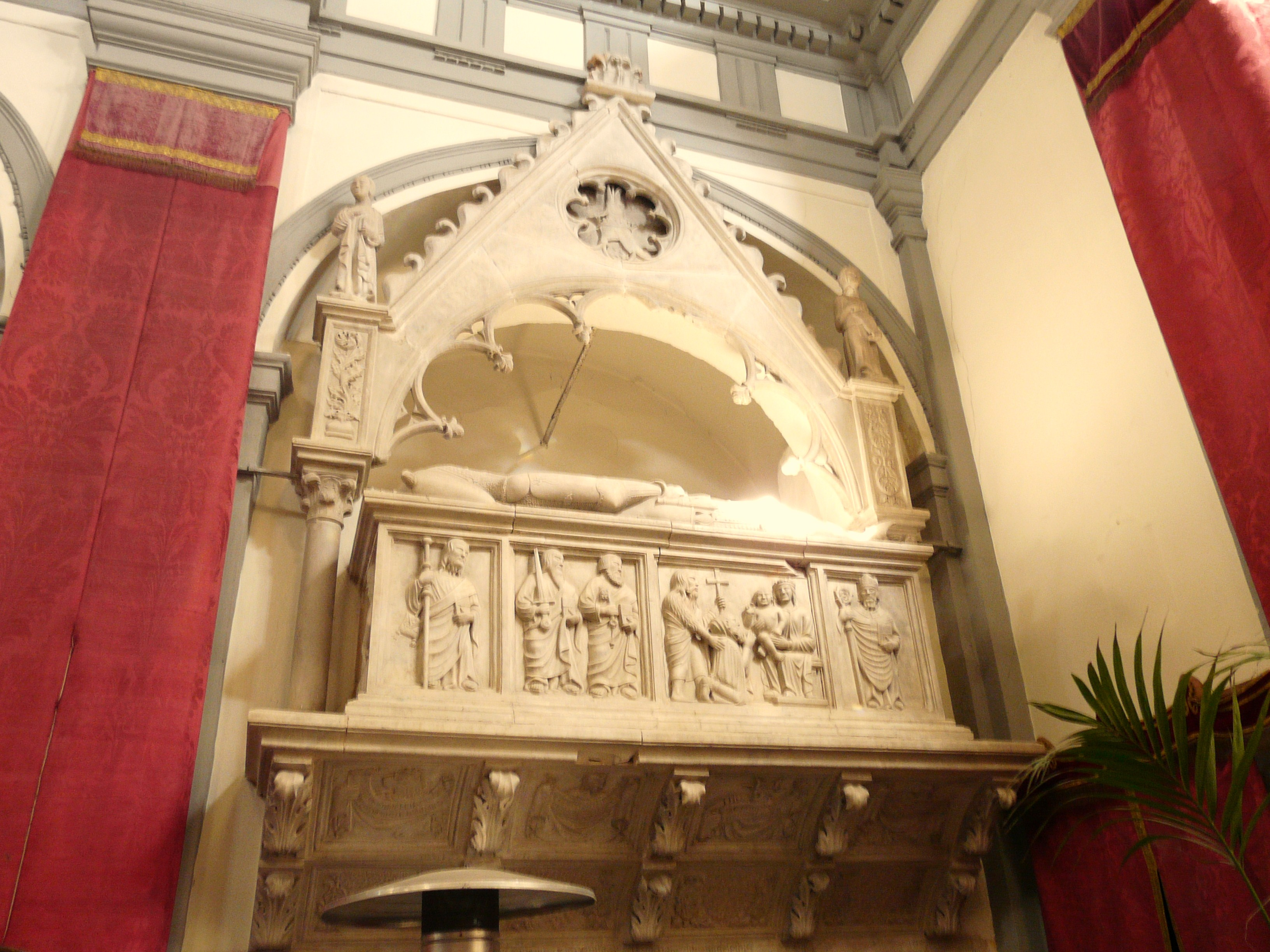
Fosdinovo, Church of San Remigio, Funeral monument of Galeotto I Malaspina, 1367.

Inside the Church of San Remigio in Fosdinovo, there is the marble fourteenth-century funeral monument of Galeotto Malaspina, in which the deceased, as a Knight, is carved in the act of investiture in the presence of the Virgin, of Christ, of Saint John the Baptist, of Saint Anthony of Padua and Saint James the Apostle, the holy holders of the main orders of chivalry in the Middle Ages.
