= Pompilio =

Pompilio is a surname. Notable people with the surname include:

- Afrânio Pompílio Gastos do Amaral (1894–1982), Brazilian herpetologist
- Arsénio Pompílio Pompeu de Carpo (1792–1869), Portuguese slave trader, freemason, poet and journalist
- Elvis Pompilio (born 1961), Belgian fashion designer
- Luca Pompilio (born 1992), Italian footballer
- Numa Pompilio Llona (1832–1907), Ecuadorian poet, journalist, educator, diplomat, and philosopher
- Pedro Pompilio (1949–2008), Argentine businessman and football chairman
