= Spinetta Malaspina =

Italian noble

Lord of Fosdinovo
- Reign: 1340-1352
- Born: 1282; Verrucola, Italy
- Died: 1352 (aged 69–70); Fosdinovo, Italy
- Spouse: Beatrice Visconti
- Issue: Giovanna Novella, Ghidda, Elisabetta; naturali: Franceschino, Boraccio, Chiaro, Giovanni, Gualterotto, Visconte.
- Father: Gabriele Malaspina
- Mother: Unknown

Spinetta Malaspina (1282–1352), also known as Spinetta Malaspina the Great, was a descendant of Obizzo Malaspina who served as Marquess of Verrucola and Lord of Fosdinovo. He was the progenitor of the Marquesses of Fosdinovo and the associated imperial fief.

== Biography ==
=== First political assignments ===
Spinetta Malaspina (c. 1282–1352), also known as Spinetta "il Grande" (Italian for "the Great"), was the firstborn son of Gabriele Malaspina of Isnardo, Marquess of Verrucola, of the Fosdinovo branch of the Malaspina family (a sub-branch of the Spino Fiorito lineage). A close ally of Uguccione della Faggiola and Cangrande della Scala, he became a fierce rival of Castruccio Castracani degli Antelminelli.

In 1308, Spinetta acquired jurisdictional authority over the Lordship of Fosdinovo. By 1340, he secured absolute control of the imperial fief. His political career advanced further under Emperor Henry VII, Holy Roman Emperor, who appointed him Imperial Vicar of Reggio, in 1311; however, he was dismissed from this role the following year (1312). In 1314, his father-in-law, Matteo Visconti, appointed him podestà (chief magistrate) of Milan.

=== Conflict with Castruccio Castracani ===
In 1317, Castruccio Castracani seized control of multiple fiefs in Lunigiana, including territories within the Lordship of Fosdinovo (notably the villages of Giucano, Tendola, and Gragnola, which pledged allegiance to Castruccio voluntarily). This forced Spinetta Malaspina to flee to Verona, where he received protection from the Scaligeri family, and entered the service of Cangrande della Scala for several years.

With military support from Cangrande, Spinetta reclaimed his lost territories in 1320. His rivalry with Castruccio ended abruptly with the latter's untimely death in 1328. In 1330, Spinetta fought against Florence under the employ of the Genoese Spinola family. For his loyalty to the Scaligeri, he was granted fiefs near Verona, including Affi, Povegliano Veronese, and Cavaion Veronese.

By 1340, Spinetta returned to his domains, consolidating authority by asserting all noble rights over neighboring lords. This culminated in his recognition as the undisputed Lord of the Marquisate of Fosdinovo, cementing his regional dominance.

=== Final years ===
Spinetta Malaspina settled in Fosdinovo, where he expanded the fortress later known as the Malaspina Castle of Fosdinovo (granted to him by local nobles as a pledge of allegiance). Having no direct heirs, he designated his nephews—Gabriele, Galeotto, and Guglielmo Malaspina, sons of his brother Azzolino—as his successors.

Upon Spinetta's death, the brothers inherited the title of Lords of Fosdinovo and consolidated absolute authority over the fiefs of Marciaso, Comano, and territories historically held by the Bianchi family, secured through strategic marriages and close kinship ties. By 1340, their control solidified Spinetta's legacy as the dynastic founder of the Marquisate of Fosdinovo.

=== Will and place of burial ===
On 1 March 1352, after months of severe illness, Spinetta Malaspina drafted his final testament. He stipulated that if he died in Lunigiana, he wished to be interred in the Church of Santa Margherita, adjacent to the Fortezza della Verrucola—the castle where he was born and later expanded. In the document, he specified burial in an "honorabili arca marmorea" (an "honorable marble tomb"), which scholars agree is distinct from the monument held at London's Victoria and Albert Museum. This latter structure, likely commissioned by his heirs as a commemorative work, is not his actual resting place.

Spinetta's will also allocated funds for charitable endeavors, including the construction of a hospital in Fivizzano and a retirement home for impoverished nobles at the Chiesa di San Giovanni in Sacco in Verona. He died later that year at age 70 in Fosdinovo Castle, though his tomb remains undiscovered.

In the 15th century, his heirs commissioned a cenotaph in his honor at San Giovanni in Sacco. Crafted by Antonio da Firenze and his workshop, the monument was sold in 1887 to the Victoria and Albert Museum in London, where it remains on display. Italian historian Rino Barbieri has proposed that Spinetta's burial site may lie within the ruins of the Proto-Romanesque Church of Santa Margherita, destroyed in a 1481 earthquake. Inscriptions on Fosdinovo Castle's facade lend credence to this theory, though the site had not been excavated as of November 2018.

== Issue ==
Spinetta Malaspina married Beatrice Visconti in 1310. The couple had three children:

- Giovanna Novella (d. after 1340): In 1340, she married Ludovico I Gonzaga, the first Captain of the People of Mantua.
- Ghidda Malaspina
- Elisabetta Malaspina

Spinetta had no direct male heirs, leading him to designate his nephews (sons of his brother Azzolino) as successors.

=== Succession ===
Preceded by Lords of Lucca	Marquess of Fosdinovo; 1340–1352	Succeeded by Galeotto I Malaspina

== Bibliography ==
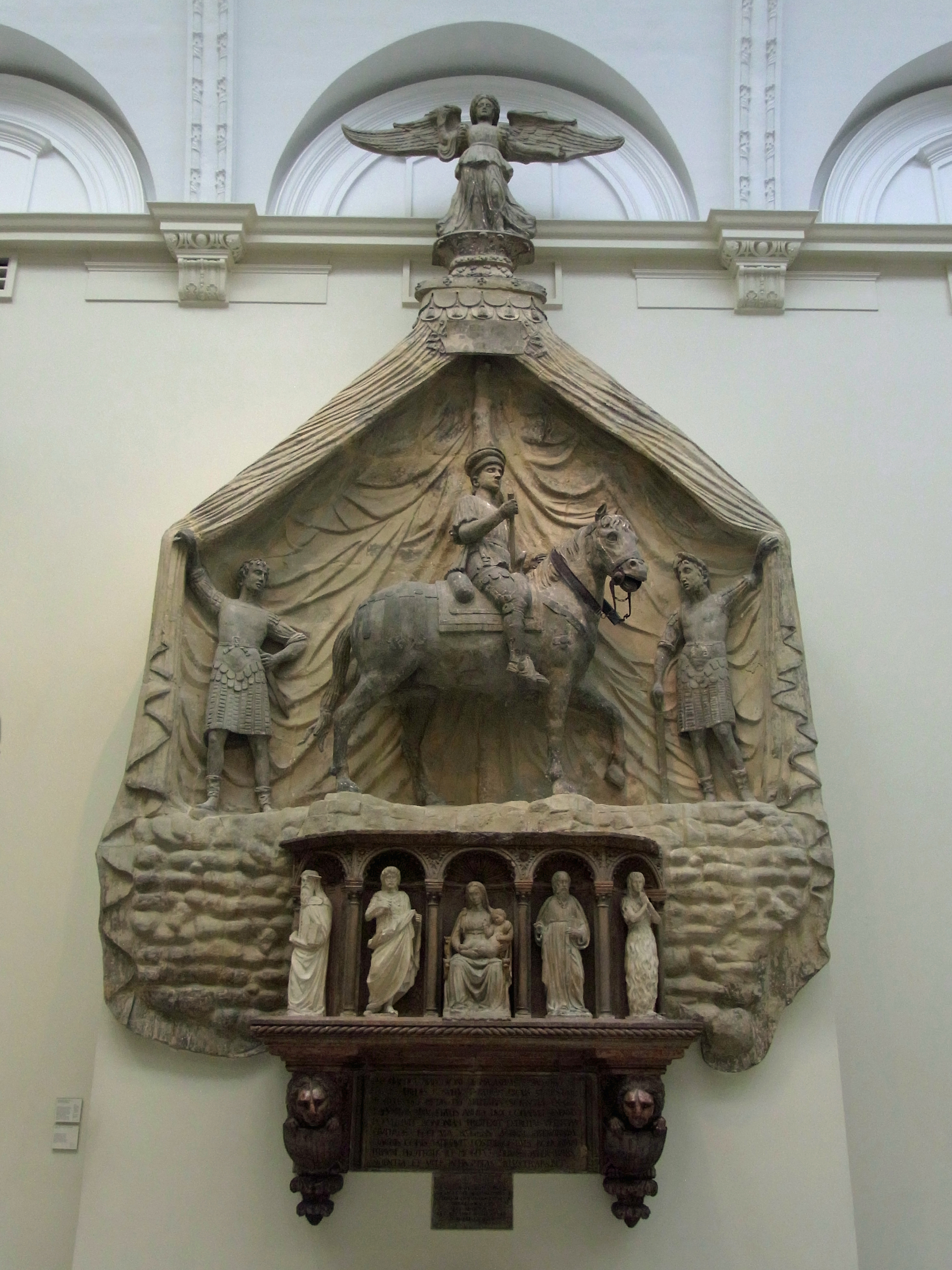
Victoria and Albert Museum, London - Monument of Marchese Spinetta Malaspina, 1430–1435.

- Umberto Dorini, Un grande feudatario del Trecento. Spinetta Malaspina, Olschki, Firenze 1940.
- Gerini, Emanuele (1829). Memorie storiche di Lunigiana, Vol.II. Massa.
- Franca Ragone (2006). "Malaspina, Spinetta". Dizionario Biografico degli Italiani (in Italian). Vol. 67: Macchi–Malaspina. Rome: Istituto dell'Enciclopedia Italiana. ISBN 978-88-12-00032-6.

== Sources ==
- article on Malaspina Castle
- article on the castles of Versilia
- Britannica. 15th Edition (1982) Vol. VI, p. 525.
