= Ortonovo =

Coordinates: 44°05′22″N 10°03′13″E

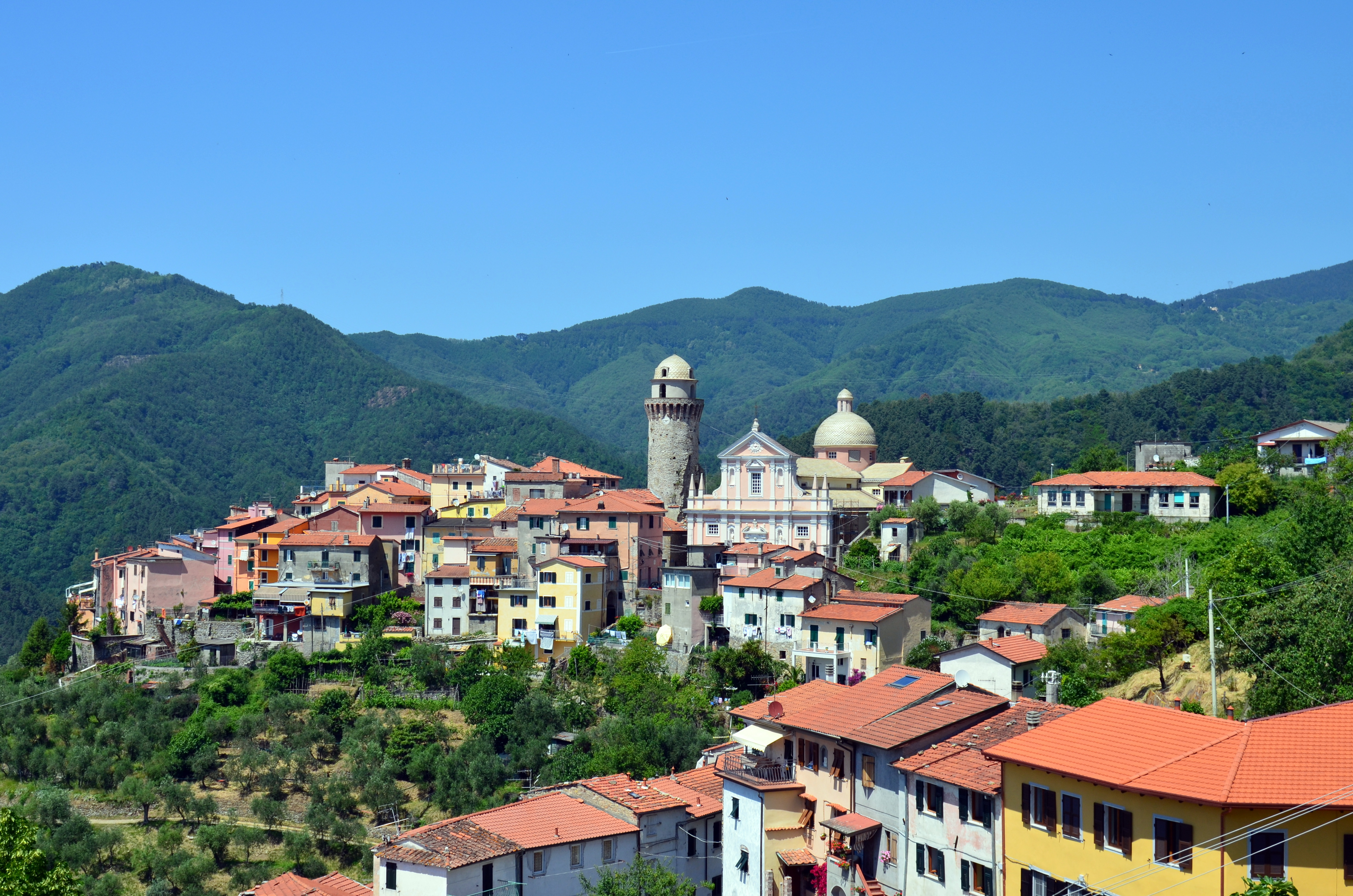
Panorama.

Ortonovo is a frazione (borough) in the comune of Luni in the Province of La Spezia, Liguria, north-western Italy.

It is located about 100 km (62 mi) southeast of Genoa and about 20 km (12 mi) east of La Spezia.

Until April 2017 it was the name of the commune including both Ortonovo and Luni.

== Main sights ==
The ancient town is surrounded by a line of walls with two entrances. In the central square is the Guinigi Tower, today the campanile of the church of St. Lawrence (17th century), but once connected to a now disappeared castle.

Other sights include the Sanctuary of Mirteto (15th century), where women saw a figure of the Virgin Mary cry tears. There is an annual patronal festival from St. Lawrence's Church to Mirteto Sactuary, featuring a procession, music, Mass, and fireworks.

== Famous personalities ==
- Dino Felici (1931-2002), sculptor
