= Fosdinovo =

- Comune
- Comune di Fosdinovo
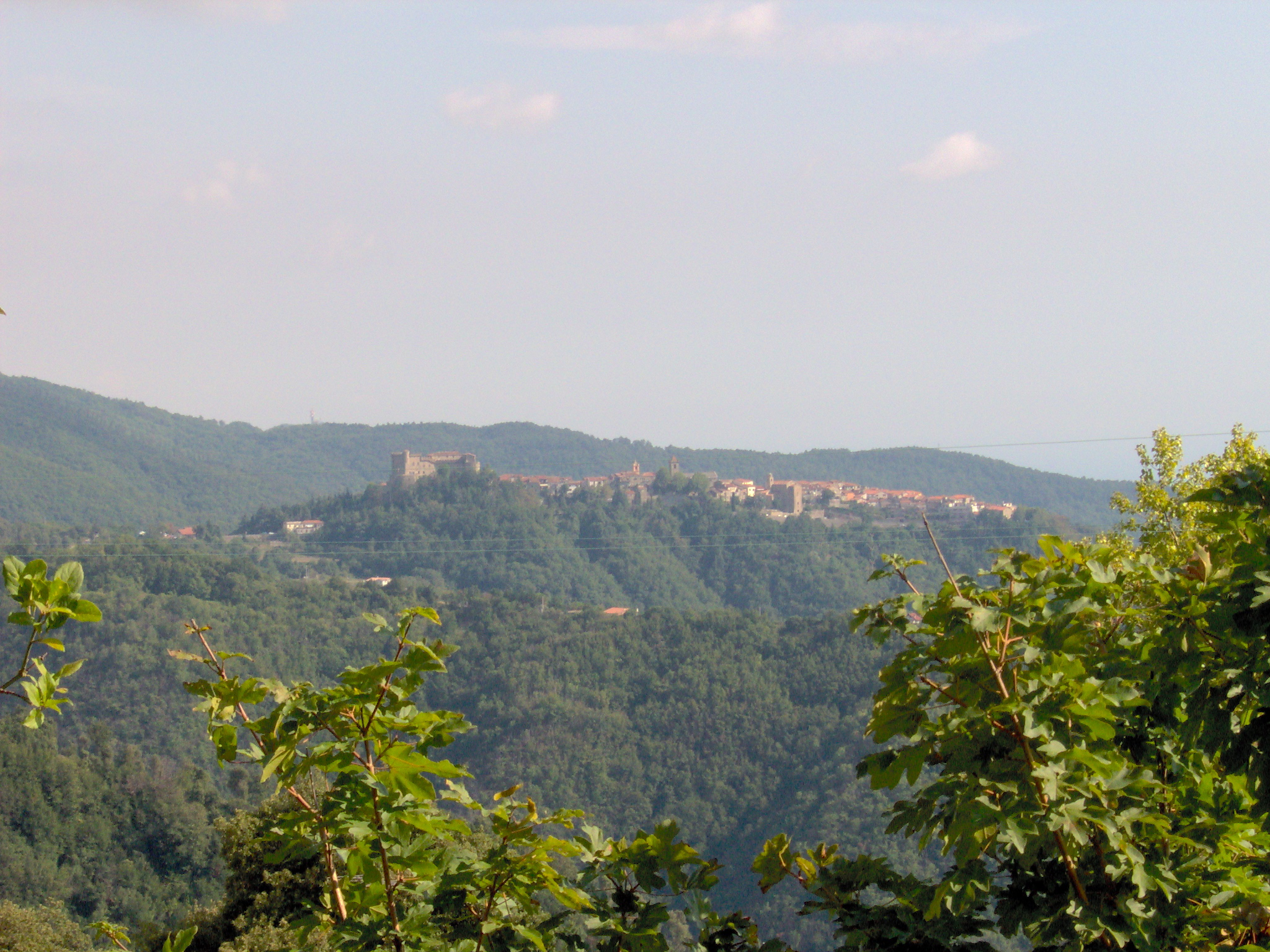

- Coat of arms

- Location within Italy Location within Tuscany
- Coordinates: 44°8′N 10°1′E
- Country: Italy
- Region: Tuscany
- Province: Massa and Carrara (MS)
- Frazioni: Canepari, Caniparola, Caprognano, Carignano, Giucano, Marciaso, Paghezzana, Palazzina, Ponzanello, Posterla, Pulica, Tendola

Government
  - Mayor: Camilla Bianchi

Area
  - Total: 48.71 km^{2} (18.81 sq mi)
- Elevation: 550 m (1,800 ft)

Population (31 August 2017)
  - Total: 4,789
  - Density: 98.32/km^{2} (254.6/sq mi)
- Demonym: Fosdinovesi
- Time zone: UTC+1 (CET)
  - Summer (DST): UTC+2 (CEST)
- Postal code: 54035, 54030
- Dialing code: 0187
- Patron saint: St. Remigius
- Saint day: 1 October
- Website: Official website

Fosdinovo is a comune (municipality) in the Province of Massa and Carrara in the Italian region Tuscany, located about 15 kilometres (9 mi) northwest of Massa and about 110 kilometres (68 mi) northwest of the regional capital Florence.

Fosdinovo borders the following municipalities: Aulla, Carrara, Castelnuovo Magra, Fivizzano, Ortonovo, Sarzana.

== History ==
The town is home to a medieval castle of the Malaspina family, rulers of the duchy of Massa.

Near to the castle is the church of San Remigio, built in the 13th century by the Bishops of Luni. The baroque church contains the marble tomb of the former Marquis Galeotto Malaspina. The Oratorio della Compagnia dei Bianchi (Oratory of the Fellowship of the Whites) was built in the 16th century and features a white marble facade donated by Pasquale Malaspina in 1666.

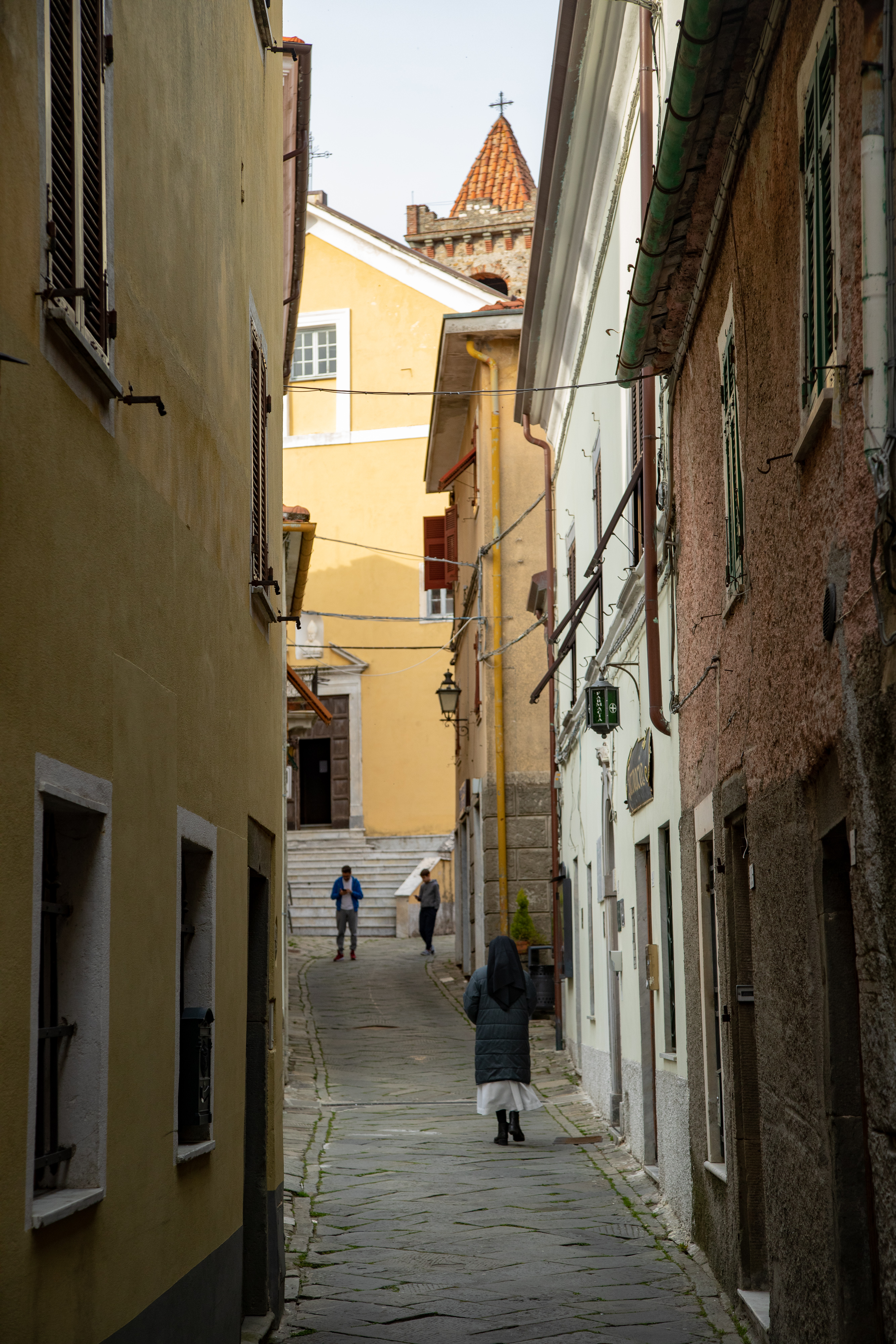
A street in the old town of Fosdinovo

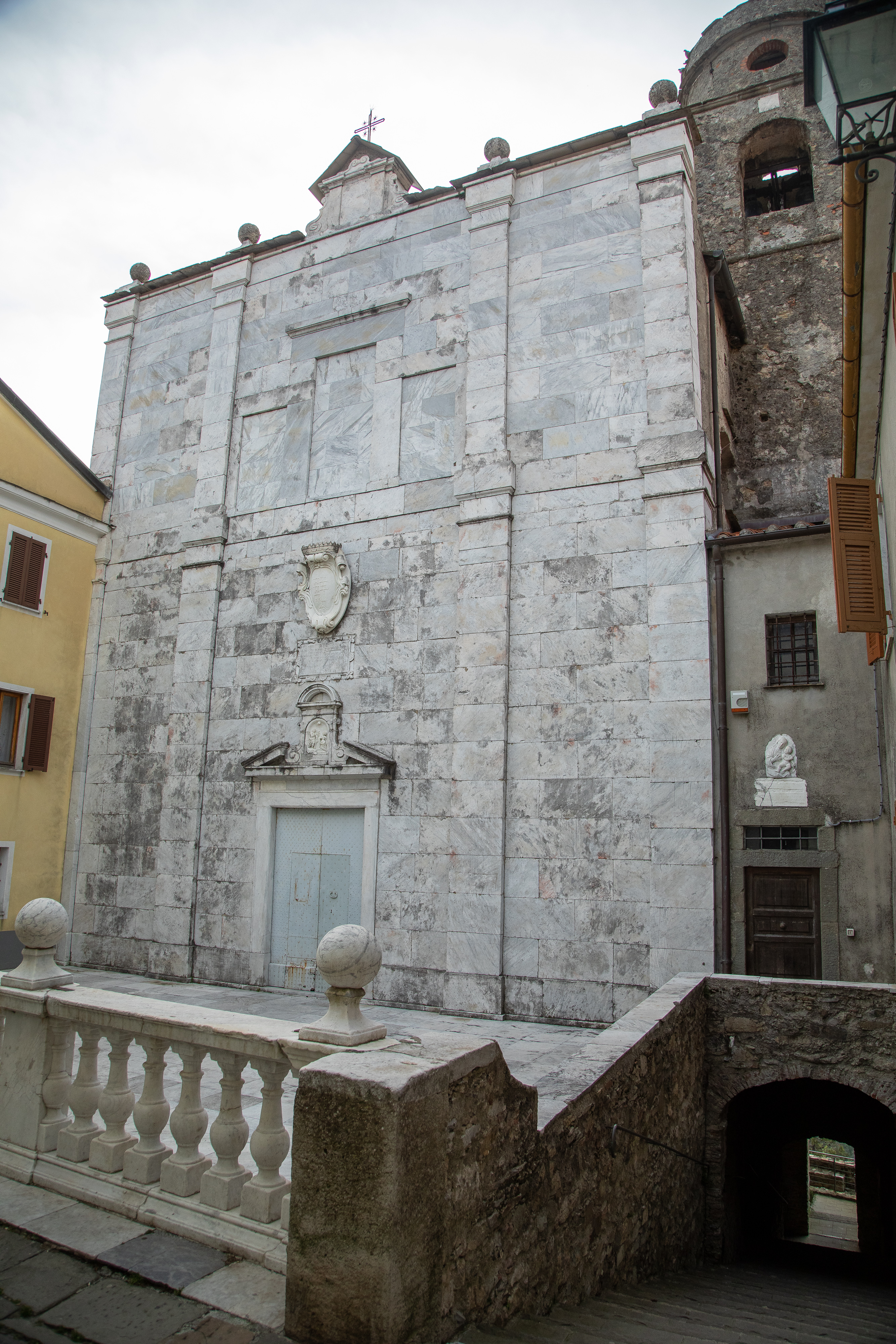
Oratorio della Compagnia dei Bianchi

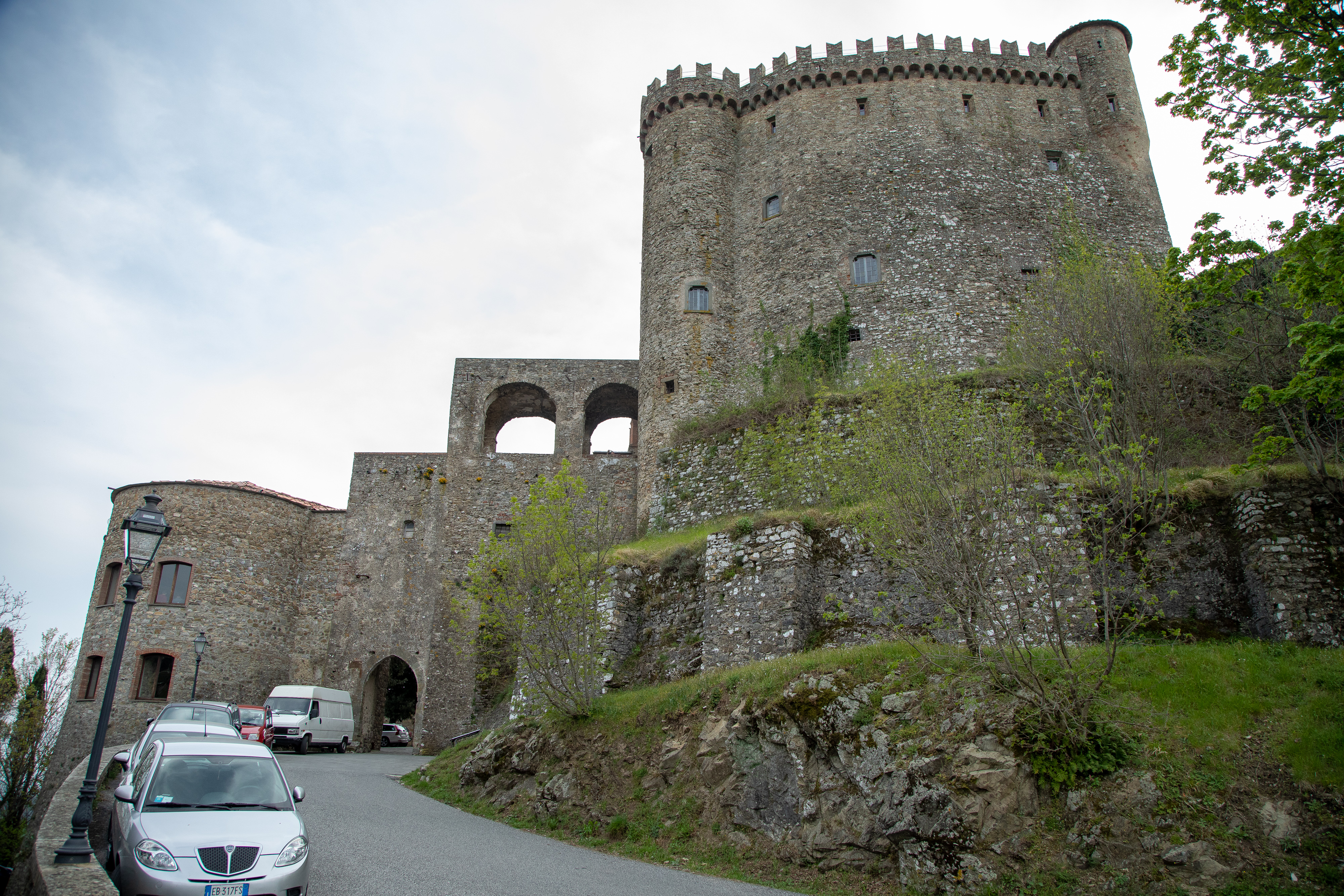
Castello Malaspina

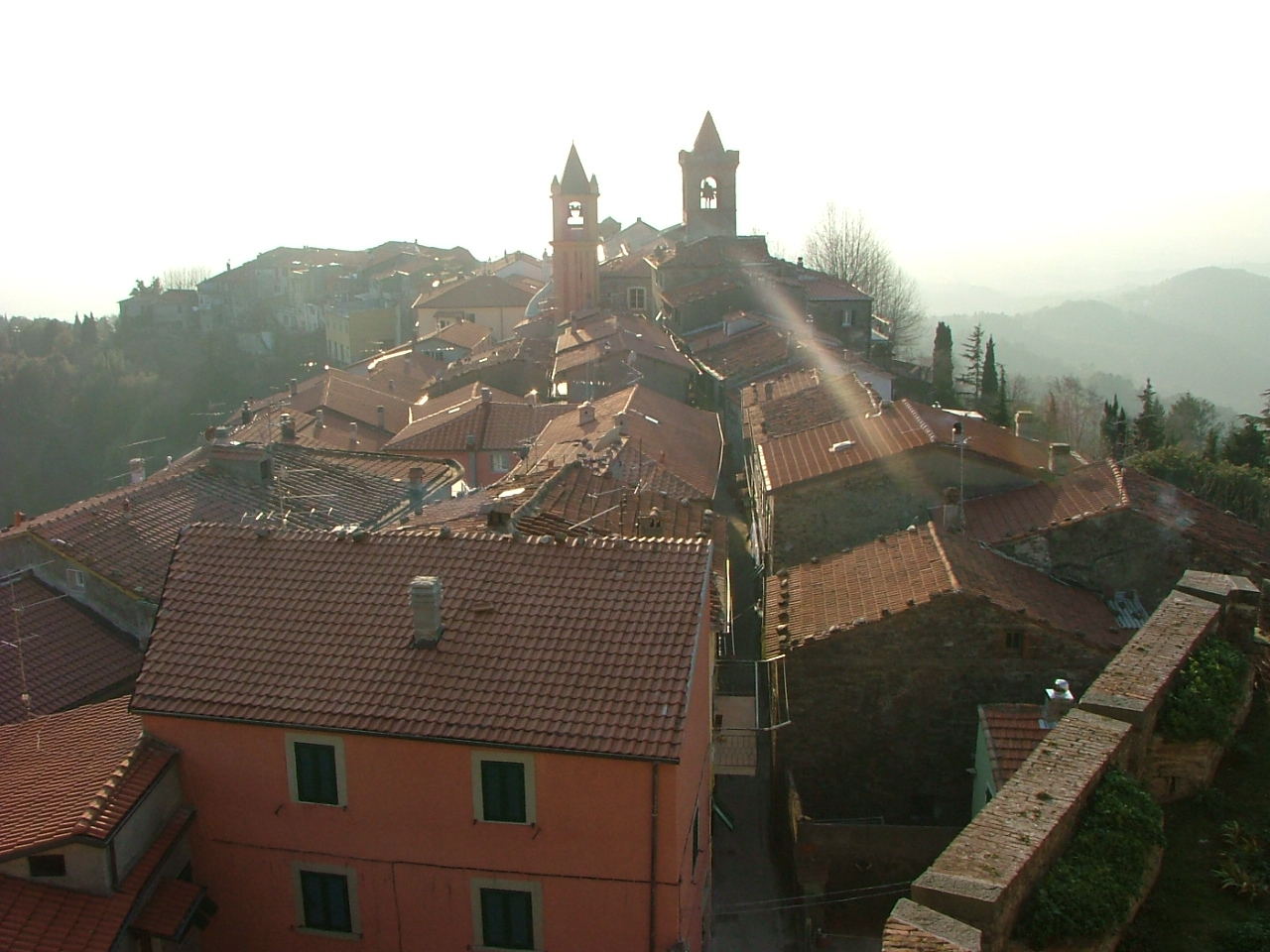
Fosdinovo seen from Castello Malaspina

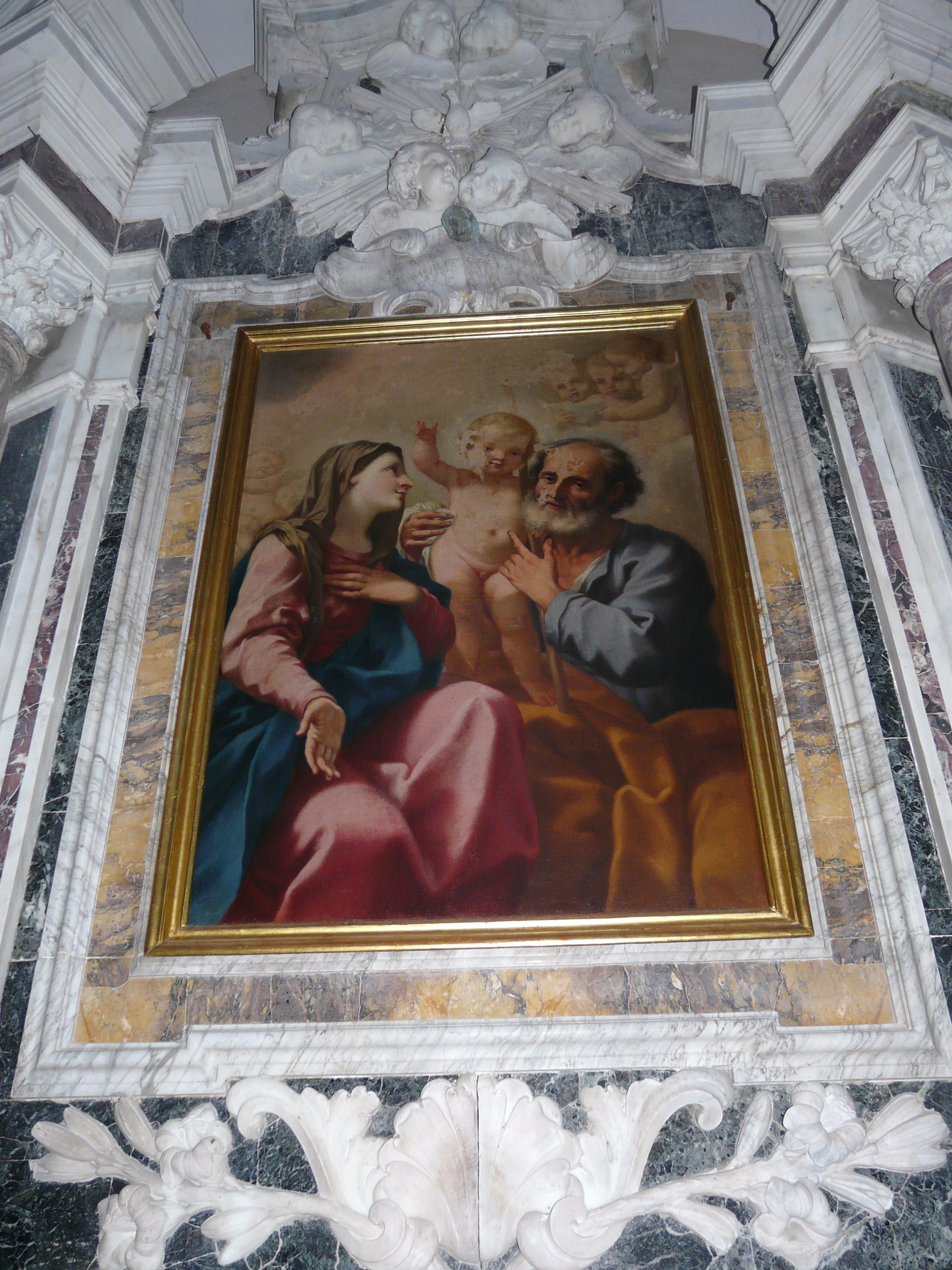
Inside Oratorio dei Bianchi

== Festivals ==
Fosdinovo is the seat of the Medieval Festival of Fosdinovo (July) and the Forza del Sorriso Festival (Strength of the Smile Festival) (the fourth weekend of August). This second festival is a new festival where the chief theme is the smile.

== Sister cities ==
Fosdinovo is twinned with:

- Sauxillanges, France, since 2003
