= Castevoli =

Village in Tuscany, Italy

- Frazione
- The Borgo of Castevoli with the castle

- Location of Castevoli within Tuscany Castevoli (Italy)
- Coordinates: 44°17′22″N 9°54′29″E
- Country: Italy
- Region: Tuscany
- Province: Massa-Carrara (MS)
- Comune: Mulazzo

Population (2021)
  - Total: 32
- Demonym: Castevolesi
- Time zone: UTC+1 (CET)
  - Summer (DST): UTC+2 (CEST)
- Postal code: 54026
- Area code: 0187
- Patron saint: St Martin
- Saint day: 11 November

Castevoli is a village (frazione) in the comune of Mulazzo, in the Province of Massa-Carrara, Tuscany, Italy. It lies on the hill slopes above the right bank of the river Magra, in the historical region of the Lunigiana, and had 32 inhabitants at the 2021 census.

The frazione consists of the three inhabited localities of Borgo, Foce and Pieve, together with a number of rural hamlets. The Borgo is the walled nucleus around the castle; the Pieve, in the valley of the Canosilla stream, is the religious centre of the district and is documented from 998.

The name first appears in 1077, in the form Casteulo, in an imperial diploma granted to the marquesses of Este. It passed to the Malaspina at the end of the 12th century and followed the fortunes of the fief of Villafranca until 1561, when it became an autonomous fief. Feudal rule was abolished in 1797; after a period under the administration of Tresana, Castevoli was attached to the comune of Mulazzo in 1849.

== Geography ==
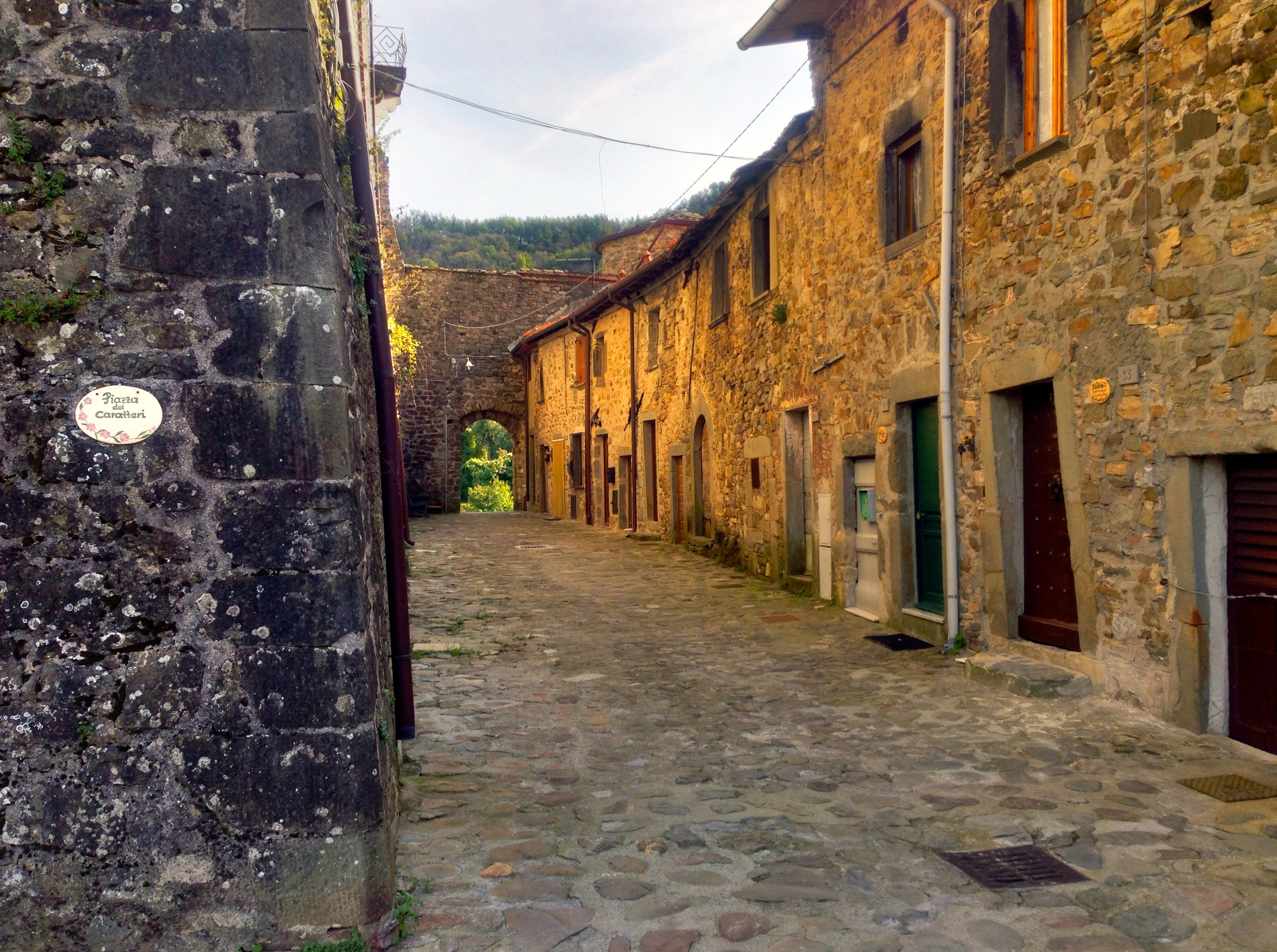
Piazza dei Caratteri, in the Borgo

Castevoli lies south of Mulazzo and opposite Villafranca, which stands on the other bank of the Magra. The land falls away from the knoll of the castle towards the valley of the Canosilla (or Canossina) stream, a right-bank tributary of the Magra. On 17th-century maps the stream marked the boundary between the territory of Tresana and that of Lusuolo and Villafranca.

The place name derives from the medieval Latin Casteolo, meaning a fortified place. According to Manfredo Giuliani the name belonged first to the knoll, then to the castle, and finally to the fief and to the village, which in the local dialect is called Casté.

The Italian census distinguishes three inhabited localities, at different altitudes:

- Borgo (9 inhabitants in 2021), the historic nucleus around the castle, at about 414 m (1,358 ft);
- Foce (11 inhabitants), the highest of the three, at about 517 m (1,696 ft);
- Pieve (12 inhabitants), at about 409 m (1,342 ft), where the pieve of San Martino stands.

To these are added the hamlets of Bergondola, Ca' del Prado, Costa d'Arzola, Fontanasaqui, Percangiola, Pradola, Rivazzo, Sogaglia and Terceretoli.

== History ==
=== Historic roads ===
The territory of Castevoli was a transit route in antiquity and in the Middle Ages. According to Manfredo Giuliani the pieve di Vico (the present pieve of San Martino) lay in line with the pievi of Urceola-Saliceto and Vignola along the course of an important road which, running along the right bank of the Verde and the Magra, connected Piacenza with the sea at Luni and with central Italy, and joined the Apennine pass of the Borgallo. In some abandoned stretches the road retained the name "via di Annibale" (Hannibal's road) and remained in use into the modern period as an alternative to the via Francesca di Monte Bardone (the Via Francigena) on the left bank of the Magra. A branch of it, still recognisable as a partly paved mule track, climbed from Gavedo through the Stola valley and the Geriola stream, passing Fontanasaqui, the Borgo, the Foce and the Pieve and continuing towards Tresana. Eugenio Branchi, by contrast, gives the name "ancient via Francesca" to the road that passed by the Geriola, linking Sarzana, Albiano, Terrarossa, Lusuolo, Groppoli, Mulazzo and Pontremoli.

=== Origins and the Middle Ages ===
The earliest record concerns the religious centre: in 998 the marquess Oberto II renounced his rights over the pieve di Vico, identified with the present pieve of San Martino, in favour of the bishop of Luni.

In 1077 the emperor Henry IV confirmed "Casteulo", in Comitatu Lunense, to the marquesses Ugo and Folco d'Este. (Note: Michelotti notes that Eugenio Branchi (Branchi 1897, p. 166) attributes the diploma to Henry III, who died in 1056.) Around 1195 Castevoli passed from the Este to the Malaspina; in the division of the Malaspina patrimony of 1221 it fell to Corrado, founder of the Spino Secco line, and in 1266 to the descendants of Federico Malaspina, later known as the marquesses of Villafranca.

On 29 September 1281, in a deed drawn up at Villafranca, the brothers "Opecino et Conrado de Casteulo" appear among the witnesses; in 1301 the inventory of the estate of the marquess Opizzone I lists "Casteoli et distrittus" among the Malaspina domains. These records document the place and its district, but do not allow the surviving structures of the castle, dated by the national heritage catalogue between the 13th and the 17th centuries, to be tied to any of them.

=== Between Villafranca and Genoa ===
In 1416 Genoese forces led by Tomaso di Campofregoso took Castevoli from the marquesses of Villafranca. On 15 March 1447 three marquesses of Villafranca undertook to hand over to the doge Giano di Campofregoso the castles of Castevoli, Brugnato, Lignaro and Rocchetta, receiving in exchange Villafranca, Virgoletta, Panigale, Licciana and other places. In 1465 a settlement assigned Castevoli to Azzone Malaspina of Mulazzo; the tenure was brief and the fief returned to the lords of Villafranca.

=== The autonomous fief ===
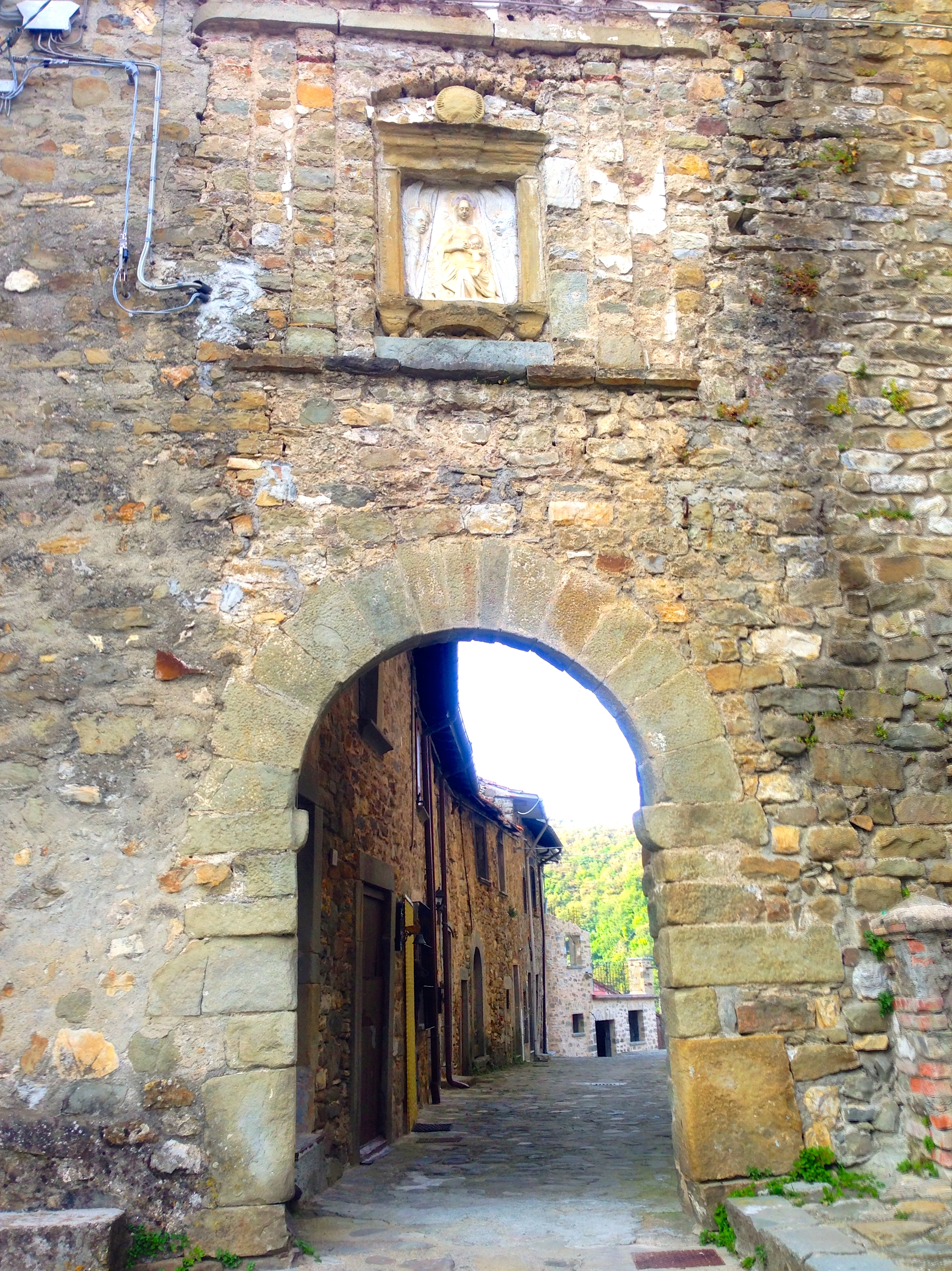
Madonna and Child, late 15th century, set above the gate of the Borgo

In 1561, on the death of the marquess Giovan Battista, his sons Alfonso and Tommaso divided the family property: Tommaso received Castevoli and made it an independent fief. (Note: The brief tenure of Azzone Malaspina of Mulazzo in 1465 did not give rise to a separate line: the autonomous Castevoli branch dates from the partition of 1561.) Tommaso I made the castle his residence and reorganised the settlement at its foot as a walled village. In 1563 he had an inscription placed at its entrance:

DEUM COLE / TEMPUS NOSCE / NIL IMPROVISO / NEC CUM IRA JUDICES / T. MALASPINA ARAGONIUS A.D. MDLXIII

In 1567 Castevoli and the other castles of the Villafranca branch were placed under the accomandigia (a form of protectorate) of Cosimo I de' Medici; in 1574 Tommaso obtained investiture of the fief from the emperor Maximilian II, confirmed in 1577 by Rudolf II.

On his death in 1603 Tommaso was succeeded by his grandson Francesco, whom he had brought up and educated at Siena in his own household; in 1619 Francesco had a marble relief of the Madonna and Child, a work of the late 15th century, set above the gate. The Castevoli branch of the Malaspina became extinct in 1676 on the death of Niccolò, who left no male heir; in 1678 the fief passed to Alfonso II Malaspina of Villafranca.

=== The 18th century and the end of the fief ===
The southern flank of the castle in a photograph of 1860–1890, showing the ravelin that has since disappeared

After passing through several hands by inheritance, in 1759 Castevoli came to Tommaso III Malaspina, at first under a regency. Having agreed with the marquess of Mulazzo to build a bridge over the Geriola stream and to levy a toll on it, in 1791 Tommaso III imposed the toll by a proclamation of 1 March although the bridge had not been built, forcing the subjects of Mulazzo to ford the stream at a more distant and difficult point; by a second proclamation of 22 March he forbade his own subjects to pass through the territories of Mulazzo and Parana. On 11 May the marquess of Mulazzo, Azzo Giacinto Malaspina, replied with an edict threatening to forbid the Observant Friars Minor of San Bernardino of Castevoli to beg for alms and to impose retaliatory tolls. These impositions and the ban on transit through the fief of Mulazzo were the origin of an uprising by the people of Castevoli against the marquess. On 23 November 1794 the emperor Francis II instructed the Duke of Modena to put down the revolt and to try those responsible; the uprising ended in 1795.

On 2 July 1797 the edict of the French general Louis Chabot abolished the imperial fiefs of the Lunigiana, bringing to an end Malaspina rule over Castevoli.

=== From the end of the fief to Mulazzo ===
After the Napoleonic period, the Congress of Vienna decided not to reestablish the imperial fiefdoms of the Lunigiana and bestowed them upon the Duchess of Massa and Carrara, Maria Beatrice d'Este, who transferred them almost immediately to her son Duke Francis IV of Modena, with an agreement dated 20 December 1815. Thus Castevoli, merged into the comune of Tresana, became part of the Duchy of Modena and Reggio until 1847. The Treaty of Florence of 28 November 1844, and in particular Article V, involved it in forthcoming territorial arrangements between Modena, the Grand Duchy of Tuscany and the Duchy of Parma and Piacenza, which took effect in 1847: Castevoli then passed to the latter, being merged, on 23 May 1849, into the comune of Mulazzo.

The castle, damaged during the revolt and by the earthquakes of 1820 and 1920, was long left derelict. In 1991 it was bought and restored by Erika End and Loris Nelson Ricci, who made it their home and the seat of a cultural centre.

== Main sights ==
=== Castle and Borgo ===
The castle in 1904, before its restoration

The castle stands on the summit of the knoll. The surviving structures, dated between the 13th and the 17th centuries, are irregular in plan, with a double curtain wall, two round towers and a triangular courtyard around which stand the keep and the watchtower. The Borgo lies at the foot of the castle and is entered through two gates.

Above the inner gate is a marble group consisting of a Madonna and Child in white marble and two angels' heads in grey bardiglio marble. The central relief, attributed to Florentine workshops of the late 15th century, was set in 1619 within a frame with a cartouche commissioned by the marquess Francesco Malaspina.

=== Pieve of San Martino ===
The pieve of San Martino

The pieve of San Martino, formerly the pieve di Vico, stands in the locality of the same name, isolated from the other settlements. The pieve is documented as an institution from 998; in 1229 an archpriest named Confalonerius is recorded there. In the 15th century it exercised jurisdiction over a network of rural chapels in the surrounding territories.

The building has a sandstone bell-gable, strengthened by an arch and a buttress. Inside is a monolithic baptismal font of macigno sandstone, chalice-shaped and Romanesque in workmanship.

=== Oratory of Santa Maria Assunta ===
In the Borgo, next to the castle, stands the oratory of Santa Maria Assunta, distinct from the pieve of San Martino. According to Giuliani, the marquess Tommaso I Malaspina restored and perhaps enlarged it during the 16th-century reorganisation of the Borgo; Giuliani himself described it as already ruined and abandoned, with some altars still visible.

=== Convent of San Bernardino ===
At the beginning of the 17th century Tommaso I Malaspina founded at Veriolo, just outside the Borgo, a convent of Observant Friars Minor dedicated to Bernardino of Siena. Branchi records there a crucifix by the Sienese artist Sebastiano Tullio; Giuliani later reported it as lost. Suppressed in the Napoleonic period and later reopened, the convent was closed for good before the end of the 19th century.

=== Oratories of the hamlets ===
The parish archive records the oratories of the Beata Vergine Addolorata at Rivazzo, of Santa Lucia at Foce, of Sant'Antonio at Terceretoli and of the Beata Vergine della Misericordia.

== Demographics ==
In the early 17th century the fief numbered about 200 households (fuochi); in 1832 the parish of San Martino had 532 inhabitants and the whole archpriest's district (arcipretura) 742. The 2011 census recorded 50 inhabitants; at the permanent census of 2021 the number had fallen to 32—12 at the Pieve, 11 at the Foce and 9 at the Borgo—a decline of more than a third in a decade.

The memory of the 18th-century uprising survives in the nickname "ribelli" (rebels) given to the inhabitants of Castevoli in the neighbouring villages.

== Bibliography ==
- Branchi, Eugenio (1897). Storia della Lunigiana feudale (in Italian). Vol. II. Pistoia: Tommaso Beggi.
- Erta, Manlio (1977). "L'Archivio Storico del Comune di Tresana". Cronaca e Storia di Val di Magra (in Italian). VI: 141–156.
- Giuliani, Manfredo (1955–1956). "La pieve, il vico e il borgo di Castevoli". Memorie dell'Accademia lunigianese di scienze e arti "Giovanni Capellini" (in Italian). XVI–XVII. La Spezia: 21–33.
- Ivaldi, Anna (1967). "La signoria dei Campofregoso a Sarzana (1421–1484)". Atti della Società ligure di storia patria. n.s. (in Italian). VII (LXXXI) (1): 87–146.
- Lisciandrelli, Pasquale (1960). Trattati e negoziazioni politiche della Repubblica di Genova (958-1797). Regesti (in Italian). Genoa: Società ligure di storia patria.
- Michelotti, Nicola (1984). "La sollevazione di Castevoli negli atti processuali". Archivio storico per le province parmensi. 4th series (in Italian). XXXVI. Parma: 111–128.
- Piras, Carla (2013). "Benedetta di Massa e le pergamene malaspiniane relative alla Sardegna negli Archivi di Stato di Firenze e di Massa". Archivio storico sardo (in Italian). XLVIII: 41–136.
- Prunai, Giulio (1963). Gli archivi storici dei comuni della Toscana (in Italian). Rome: Ministero dell'interno, Pubblicazioni degli Archivi di Stato. Quaderni della Rassegna degli Archivi di Stato, 22.
- Repetti, Emanuele (1846). Appendice al Dizionario geografico fisico storico della Toscana (in Italian). Florence: Giovanni Mazzoni.
