= Conrad Malaspina =

Conrad Malaspina may refer to:

- Conrad Malaspina the Elder (died c. 1254), lord of Lunigiana, Italian political and military leader
- Conrad Malaspina the Younger, Italian nobleman and landowner, grandson of the above
