= Treaty of Florence (1844) =

1844 secret agreement between Tuscany, Modena, and Lucca

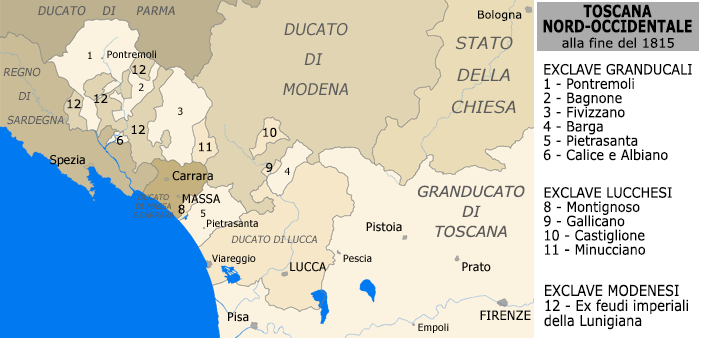
- Northwest Tuscany at the end of 1815 (in 1829, the Duchy of Massa and Carrara was annexed by the Duchy of Modena and Reggio)
- Signed: November 28, 1844
- Location: Florence, Grand Duchy of Tuscany
- Effective: Upon the death of Marie Louise, Duchess of Parma, Piacenza, and Guastalla (occurred on 17 December 1847)
- Condition: From this date, the treaty's clauses provide for: Reversion of the Duchy of Parma, Piacenza, and Guastalla to the Bourbon-Parma, temporarily installed in the Duchy of Lucca.; Annexation of the Duchy of Lucca by the Grand Duchy of Tuscany (occurred earlier, on 9 October 1847, following the abdication of the Duke of Lucca).; Annexation by the Duchy of Modena and Reggio of the Tuscan enclave of Fivizzano and former Lucchese enclaves centered on Gallicano, Minucciano, Castiglione, and Montignoso (including all of Lake Porta) (occurred earlier, after 9 October 1847, following the abdication of the Duke of Lucca).; Annexation by Parma and Piacenza of all other Tuscan enclaves in the Lunigiana except Fivizzano (Pontremoli, Bagnone, Groppoli, Lusuolo, Terrarossa, Calice, Albiano, etc.).; Cession of the Duchy of Guastalla from Parma to Modena.; Adjustment of borders between the Duchy of Parma and Piacenza and the Duchy of Modena and Reggio along the Enza River and an exchange of territories in the Lunigiana.
- Parties: Grand Duchy of Tuscany; Duchy of Modena and Reggio; Duchy of Lucca (Note: The Duke of Lucca participated as the future Duke of Parma.); Austrian Empire; Kingdom of Sardinia
- Languages: Italian

The Treaty of Florence, signed on 28 November 1844, was a secret agreement between the governments of the Grand Duchy of Tuscany, the Duchy of Modena and Reggio, and Charles Louis of Bourbon-Parma, Duke of Lucca and future Duke of Parma, Piacenza, and Guastalla.

The treaty aimed to update the territorial provisions and compensations established by the Congress of Vienna in 1815, while rationalizing borders among the involved states in the regions of the Lunigiana, the Garfagnana, the coast facing the Apuan Alps, and along the Enza River in Emilia. These areas featured complex boundaries and numerous enclaves.

== Background ==
The Congress of Vienna and the related Treaty of Paris of 1817 assigned the Duchy of Parma, Piacenza, and Guastalla to Marie Louise of Austria, Napoleon Bonaparte’s second wife, for her lifetime. She was a distant cousin of the other sovereigns involved, who were all interrelated.

Upon Marie Louise's death, the Duchy of Parma was to revert to the legitimate rulers, the Bourbon-Parmas, who had been temporarily appointed Dukes of Lucca, taking possession of the territories of the former Republic of Lucca, dissolved by Napoleon in June 1805.

The Congress of Vienna granted the Grand Duke of Tuscany the right of reversion over Lucca when the Bourbons moved to Parma, with territorial compensations for the Duchy of Modena. Modena was also set to incorporate the neighboring Duchy of Massa and Carrara, which occurred in 1829, upon the death of the last Duchess Maria Beatrice d'Este, who was succeeded by her son and heir apparent Francis IV, Duke of Modena.

== Signing and changes from Vienna and Paris ==
After prolonged secret negotiations in Florence, on 28 November 1844, representatives of Tuscany, Modena, and Lucca, in the presence of ambassadors from the Kingdom of Sardinia and the Habsburgs, (Note: Pursuant to Article VII of the Treaty of Aix-la-Chapelle of 1748, the Kingdom of Sardinia and the Austrian Empire held reversion rights over Parma, Piacenza, and Guastalla in case of the extinction of the Bourbon-Parma or their transfer to another major Bourbon domain. This right was reaffirmed by the Final Act of the Congress of Vienna, making them directly interested in the treaty.) agreed to modify the decisions made in Vienna and Paris nearly 30 years earlier. (Note: A detailed analysis of the treaty’s clauses is found in the Tuscany entry of Gaetano Moroni’s dictionary, cited in the bibliography (pp. 221 ff.).)

Upon the death of Marie Louise (who was deliberately kept unaware of the treaty), Parma would revert to the Bourbon-Parmas, and Lucca would simultaneously pass to Tuscany, as planned. Many territorial cessions from Tuscany to Modena were confirmed, including the Tuscan vicariate of Fivizzano in the Lunigiana and Lucca's enclaves of Gallicano, Minucciano, Castiglione, and Montignoso (the latter including the entire Lake Porta, previously shared with Tuscany's Pietrasanta enclave).

In return, Modena relinquished claims to the vicariates of Pietrasanta (excluding part of Lake Porta) and Barga (except territories on the northern Apennines slope), which the Congress of Vienna had slated for annexation. Grand Duke Leopold II fiercely defended these territories, viewed as quintessentially Tuscan, historically tied to Florence, and set to become contiguous with other Tuscan lands upon Lucca's reversion.

In exchange for Modena's renunciation of Pietrasanta and Barga, Tuscany agreed to transfer all its Lunigiana enclaves except Fivizzano (Pontremoli, Bagnone, Groppoli, Lusuolo, Terrarossa, Calice, Albiano, etc.) to Parma. Parma, in turn, ceded the former Duchy of Guastalla to Modena, (Note: Guastalla was an enclave between the Este states and the Kingdom of Lombardy–Venetia.) and would henceforth be known only as the “Duchy of Parma and Piacenza.” Critics, dissatisfied with trading Guastalla's fertile lands for underdeveloped mountainous regions, mockingly referred to it as “Parma, Piacenza, and annexed stones.”

Additionally, the treaty stipulated that the two Emilian duchies would rationalize their borders by mutually exchanging territories along the Enza River and in the Lunigiana. Modena received parts of Brescello (Coenzo a Mane, Sorbolo a Mane), Poviglio, Gattatico, portions of Canossa (Ciano, Canossa and Rossena castles, Borzano d’Enza, Compiano, Gombio, Roncaglio), and parts of the “Valley of the Knights” (Succiso, Miscoso, Cecciola, Lugolo, Castagneto, Poviglio, Storlo, Pieve S. Vincenzo, Temporia, Cereggio). Parma gained Scurano and Bazzano. In the Lunigiana, to eliminate mutual enclaves, the states agreed to amicably exchange the former Tuscan territories of Albiano, Calice, Riccò, and Terrarossa (ceded to Parma under another treaty clause) for Modena's former imperial fiefs of Treschietto, Villafranca, Castevoli, and Mulazzo, held since 1815.

== Lucca crisis and Modena-Tuscany dispute ==
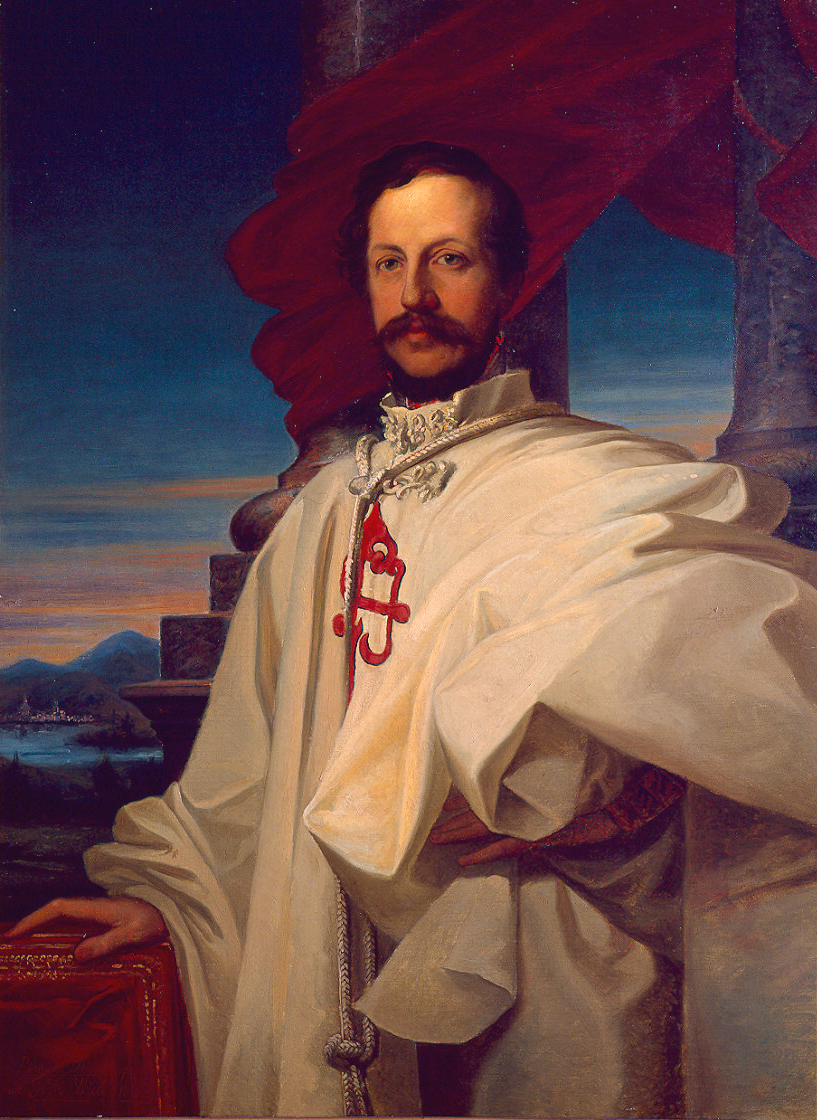
Charles Louis of Bourbon, who became Duke of Parma as Charles II upon Marie Louise's death.

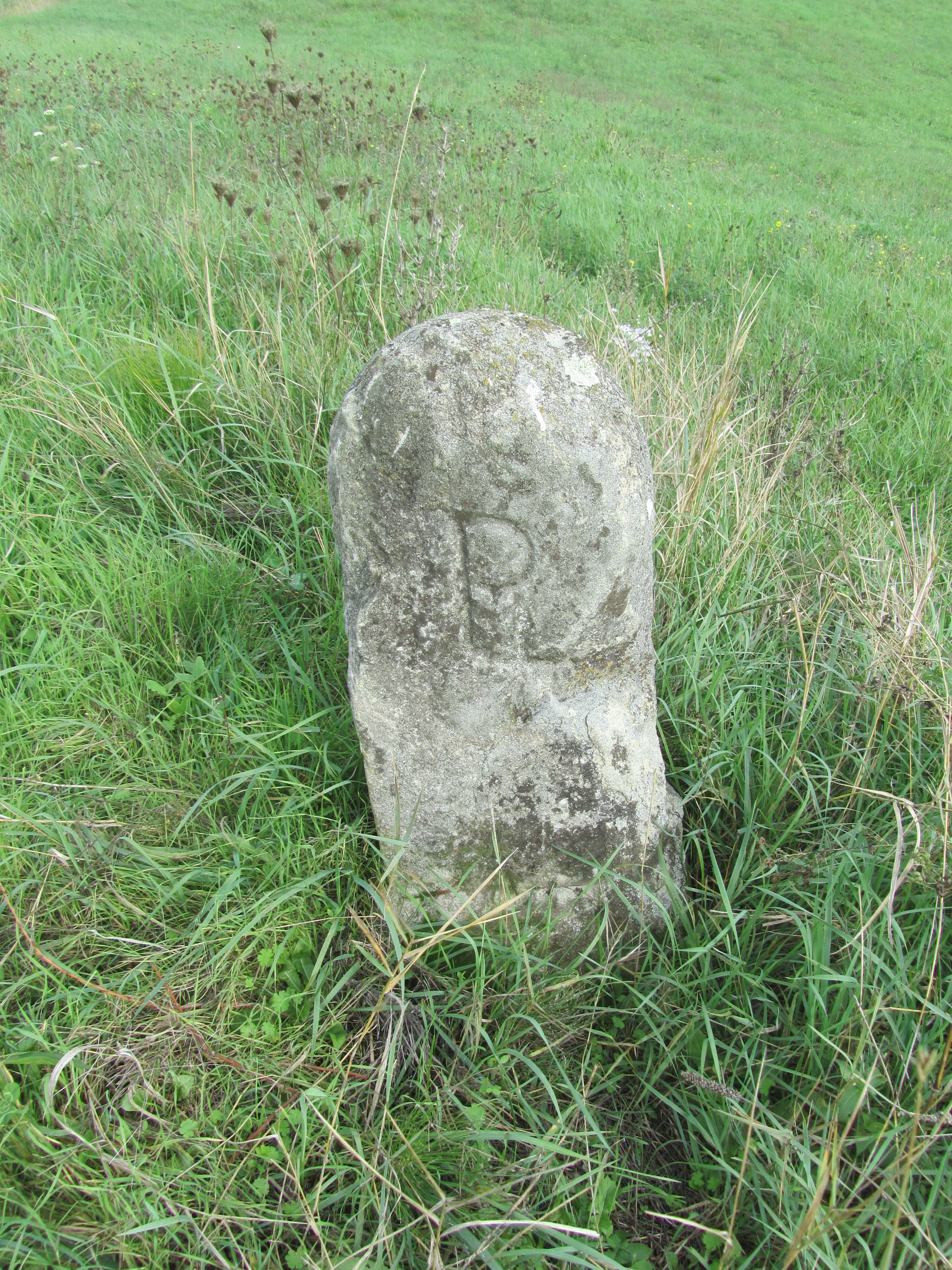
Boundary marker of the Duchy of Parma and Piacenza between Modena and Parma until 1847.

In September 1847, Lucca faced demands for liberal reforms, already granted in Tuscany, directed at Duke Charles Louis. After initially resisting and making minor concessions, he fled to Modena under pressure, transforming the Council of State into a Regency Council.

On 9 October 1847, Charles Louis abdicated in favor of Leopold II of Tuscany, who granted him a substantial annual pension until he assumed the Duchy of Parma, which occurred soon after on 17 December 1847, following Marie Louise's sudden death.

The treaty's implementation and public reactions were anticipated by the three sovereigns (Leopold II, Charles II, and Francis V):

- In Lucca, fears of being pawns in territorial deals were eased by Leopold II's conciliatory approach, including abolishing the death penalty for new subjects (formally in force in Tuscany but unused since 1830).
- In Pontremoli and Fivizzano (Lunigiana), populations resisted transitioning from Tuscany's lenient rule to the stricter governance of the Bourbon-Parma and Habsburg-Este.
- Pontremoli protested its cession to Parma by sending a delegation to Leopold II, with locals threatening to burn the city, following the Moscow fire of 1812 example.
- In Fivizzano, Modena's troops faced and harshly suppressed a local uprising.

In Tuscany, calls emerged for Leopold II to declare war on Modena and Parma. To avoid conflict and retain territory, Leopold offered substantial financial compensation to both sovereigns to forgo annexations. Charles II, burdened by debt, accepted, but Francis V of Modena refused.

Ultimately, Austrian pressure ensured the treaty's clauses were enforced, allowing Parma and Modena to occupy the ceded territories.

== See also ==
- Treaty of Vienna (1815)
- Italian unification
- House of Habsburg-Lorraine
- Kingdom of the Two Sicilies
- Revolutions of 1848 in the Italian states

== Bibliography ==
- Collectif (1849). "Inclosure 2 in No. 243. Treaty of Florence of November 28, 1844". Correspondence respecting the Affairs of Italy. 1846–1847 (in English and Italian). London: Harrison.
- Goldoni, Claudio Maria (2010). Atlante Estense. Mille anni nella storia d'Europa [Este Atlas. A Thousand Years in European History] (in Italian). Modena: Edizioni Artestampa. ISBN 9788864620053.
- Moroni, Gaetano (1856). "TOSCANA, ETRURIA". Dizionario di erudizione storico-ecclesiastica da San Pietro fino ai nostri giorni [Dictionary of Historical-Ecclesiastical Erudition from Saint Peter to Our Days] (in Italian). Vol. LXXVIII. Venice: Tipografia emiliana.
