= Conrad Malaspina the Younger =

Italian nobleman and landowner

Coat of arms of the Spino Secco branch of the family.

Corrado Malaspina (called "il Giovane", "The Young", as opposed to his grandfather Corrado Malaspina "il Vecchio", "The Old") was an Italian nobleman and landowner.

He was born in the first decades of the 13th century, the illegitimate son of Frederic I Malaspina, and died sometime between September 1294 and 1300. He is best remembered as a character in the poetry of Dante Alighieri and Giovanni Boccaccio.

== Biography ==
Conrad Malaspina was born sometime in the first two decades of the 13th century. Natural son of Frederic I, Marquess of Villafranca in Lunigiana and of Virgoletta, he was raised by his grandfather Conrad the old, the forefather of the Spino Secco branch of the Malaspina, lords of Lunigiana since the 11th century.

=== Wedding ===
The first documents attributed to him date back to 1234 and are about his wedding, which took place two years before to a woman named Urica, the biological daughter of Marianus II of Torres, a judge from Sardinia.

Other documents from 1281 to 1305 talk about a certain Orietta as Conrad's wife, who may be tied to the Genoese families of the Zanche or the Spinola, but it is also possible that it is the same woman, with her name translated from the Sardinian dialect.

He didn't have any legitimate heirs, but there was an illegitimate son nicknamed Figliastro (Stepson), and Boccaccio talks about a daughter called Spina. It is plausible, however, that she was just invented for the tale. If she existed, she would have been born around 1264.

=== Wars and management of the family's wealth ===
The wedding between Conrad and the daughter of the judge of Torres brought an expansion of the Malaspina family interests also in Sardinia; however, in 1266 the wealth acquired there was divided into three parts between Conrad and his uncles Moroello and Manfredi because Conrad didn't have a legitimate male heir.

In 1278, on the initiative of the uncle Moroello, the Malaspina occupied the town of Chiavari causing a war with Genoa to which Conrad only participated marginally, to the point that he was absent for the peace oath, being in his overseas lands of Sardinia.

The management of the territory in the following years proved fruitful for the bonds with Genoese families that were strengthened by weddings and both political and financial joint ventures.

The collaboration with the Genoese families was linked to the war between Genoa and Pisa. The Malaspina family supported Genoa's faction by funding the expeditions (with maneuvers like the acquisition by Conrad of the localities of Casteldoria and the curatorìa (judgedom) of Anglona from Brancaleone Doria, for 9,300 lire, that were immediately handed back) and militarily by participating on the first line in the expedition that culminated in the battle of Meloria (1284) and the Pisan defeat.

Concerning the heirloom of his grandfather in 1266 the possessions in Lunigiana and on the Apennines were divided amongst the heirs, i.e., Conrad and his two brothers Tommaso and Opizzino and his three uncles Manfredi, Alberto, and Moroello. (Majorat was not yet enforced)

Conrad and his brothers earned the Lunigianese settlements with Villafranca as the most important of them and other assets in Val Trebbia and Val Staffora (in the Oltrepò Pavese), plus the Sardinian belongings.

In 1281 there was yet another division of the Spino Secco possessions, most likely due to conflicts between the Malaspina and the bishop of Luni. Also this time Conrad's contribution seems minimal.

The last information about Conrad is his testament, written in September 1294 in Mulazzo, in which he recognized his brothers Tommaso and Opizzino as universal heirs. Because there is no trace of him afterward, it is believed that he died later the same year.

== In literature ==
Conrad distinguished himself in the Spino Secco branch because of vast interest in traditions and conscience of the history and standing of the family. His figure has become that of the virtuous noble that represents the courteous ideals of chivalry. It has inspired two of the major authors of the fourteenth century: Dante Alighieri and Boccaccio.

=== Dante's Purgatorio ===
Dante, in the eighth canto of the Purgatorio, presents his encounter with Conrad in the Valley of Rulers where he stands out because of his values of love and family. He starts with a captatio benevolentiae, wishing that Dante will have the strength to reach the Empyrean, using a "literary and graceful language" that shows the "moral and material decorum" of the character. He then presents himself by stating his name and surname, a rare happening in the Divine Comedy and immediately completes the identification by including his parentage to another well-known member of the family. He is not boasting, but talking with dignity. He concludes by saying that his love for his family is why he has to wait in the Ante-Purgatory:

"Se la lucerna che ti mena in alto
truovi nel tuo arbitrio tanta cera
quant'è mestiere infino al sommo smalto",
cominciò ella, "se novella vera
di Val di Magra o di parte vicina
sai, dillo a me, che già grande là era.
Fui chiamato Currado Malaspina;
non son l'antico, ma di lui discesi;
a' miei portai l'amor che qui raffina".

—Dante Alighieri, Purgatorio VIII.112-120
Translation:

"So may the lantern leading thee above,
find in thy will the wax that is required
for one to reach the enamelled green on high;"
he thus began, "if thou of Val di Magra,
or of its neighboring land, dost know true news,
tell it to me, who once was mighty there.
Corrado Malaspina I was called;
I'm not the elder, but from him descended;
I bore my race the love which here is cleansed."

—Courtney Langdon (1921)

Then starts Dante's homage to the family, whose hospitality is legendary not only in Italy but in Europe. It is a tribute to those who welcomed him when he was in exile, but also an example that is set for others to follow.

=== Boccaccio's Decameron ===
Conrad appears in Boccaccio's Decameron, in the sixth novella of the second day, the one dedicated to stories of people that after a great misfortune are able to turn the tables with the help of luck and end up in a better situation than at the beginning. In Boccaccio, he embodies the ideal of the generous lord and, just like in Dante, his family is characterized by hospitality. In the end, after finding out the true story of Giuffredi, he helps him reunite with his mother, his father and his brother, and lets him marry his daughter.

== Notes ==
1. not the one mentioned above.

== Bibliography ==
- A.Ferretto, Codice diplomatico delle relazioni tra la Liguria, la Toscana e la Lunigiana ai tempi di Dante, in Atti della Società Ligure di Storia Patria, XXXI, fascicoli I (1901) e II (1903), I, ad indicem.
- A.Ferretto, Documenti intorno ai trovatori Percivalle e Simone Doria, Studi medievali, I (1904-1905), pp. 130–131, n. VII.
- F. Patetta, Notizie di storia sarda tratte da un registro camaldolese del 1278, in "Archivio Storico Sardo", I (1905), pp. 122–132.
- Acta Aragonensia. Quellen zur deuitschen, italianischen, französischen, spanischen, zur Kirchengzeschichte aus der diplomatischen Korrespondenz Jaymes II (1291-1327) , ed. H. Finke, Berlin, Leipzig, 1908–1922, nn 515, 524.
- M. Lupo Gentile, Il regesto del codice Pelavicino, in Atti della Società Ligure di Storia Patria, XLIV (1912), nn. 523–524.
- Annali genovesi di Caffaro e de' suoi continuatori dal MXCIX al MCCXCII'I, 4, a cura di C. Imperiale di Sant'Angelo, Roma 1926, pp. 181–184.
- V. Salavert y Roca, Cerdeña y la espansion mediterranea de la Corona de Aragon , 1297-1314 Madrid, 1956 alla voce Malaspina Corrado.
- F. C. Casula, Carte Reali Diplomatiche di Alfonso III il Benigno, re d'Aragona, riguardanti l'Italia, Padova, 1970, n. 175.
- Dante Alighieri, La Divina Commedia, ed. G. Petrocchi, Torino 1975, Purgatorio, canto VIII.
- L. Balletto, Studi e documenti su Genova e la Sardegna nel secolo XIII, in Saggi e documenti, a cura di G. Pistarino, II/2, Genova, 1981, n. 41.
- M. N. Conti, Le carte anteriori al 1400 nell'archivio malaspiniano di Caniparola nel repertorio del 1760, Pontremoli, 1988, nn. 108, 109, 111, 243, 387.
- Giovanni Boccaccio, Decameron, a cura di V. Branca, Torino 1992, giornata II, novella VI.
- I Libri Iurium della Repubblica di Genova, I/5, a cura di E. Madia, Roma 1999, nn. 867, 868, 991; I/ 7, a cura di E. Pallavicino, Roma 2001, nn. 1202–1204.
- E. Gerini, Memorie storiche d'illustri scrittori e d'uomini insigni dell'antica e moderna Lunigiana, Massa, 1829, II, pp. 28, 314.
- Franco Quartieri, "Dante e i Malaspina" in "Analisi e paradossi su Commedia e dintorni", Longo editore, Ravenna 2006.
- T. Casini, Ricordi Danteschi di Sardegna, in "Nuova Antologia", LVIII (1985), pp. 1–43.
- E. Branchi, Storia della Lunigiana feudale, Pistoia, 1897–1899, II, pp. 9–22.
- E. Donadoni, Lectura Dantis - Canto VIII del Purgatorio, Firenze 1932.
- G.R. Sarolli, L'aula malaspiniana nei secoli XII-XIII, in «Rendiconti della Classe di Lettere dell'Istituto Lombardo di Scienze e Lettere», LXXXIV- XV della serie III, Milano 1951, pp. 167–178.
- S. Bernardi Saffiotti, Malaspina Corrado, in Enciclopedia Dantesca, III, Roma, 1969, pp. 779–780.
- L. L. Brook, F. C. Casula, M. M. Costa, A. M. Oliva, R. Pavoni e M. Tangheroni, Genealogie medievali di Sardegna, Cagliari-Sassari, 1984, Pisa, XXII.11, XXV, 3, 6 e 13.
- R. Pavoni, Genova e i Malaspina nei secoli XII e XIII, in La storia dei Genovesi. Atti del VII convegno di studi sui ceti dirigenti nelle istituzioni della Repubblica di Genova, Genova, 1987, pp. 288–290.
- A. Soddu, Storia della penetrazione dei Malaspina nel Logudoro, in Gli Obertenghi di Massa e della Lunigiana ed i regni della Sardegna (secoli XII-XIV) , a cura di M.G. Armanini e M. Tangheroni, Pisa, 1999, 109–121.
- A. Soddu, I Malaspina nella Sardegna dei giudici (XII-XIII secolo) , in "Giornale Storico della Lunigiana", LIV (2003), pp. 190–201.
- E. Basso e A. Soddu, L'Anglona negli atti del notaio Francesco Da Silva (1320-1326) , Perfugas (SS), 2001 pp. 73–74.
- N. Tonelli, Purgatorio VIII 46-139: l'incontro con Nino Visconti e Corrado Malaspina, in "Tenzone", 3 (2002), 263–281.
