= Lago di Porta =

Lake and protected area in Tuscany, Italy

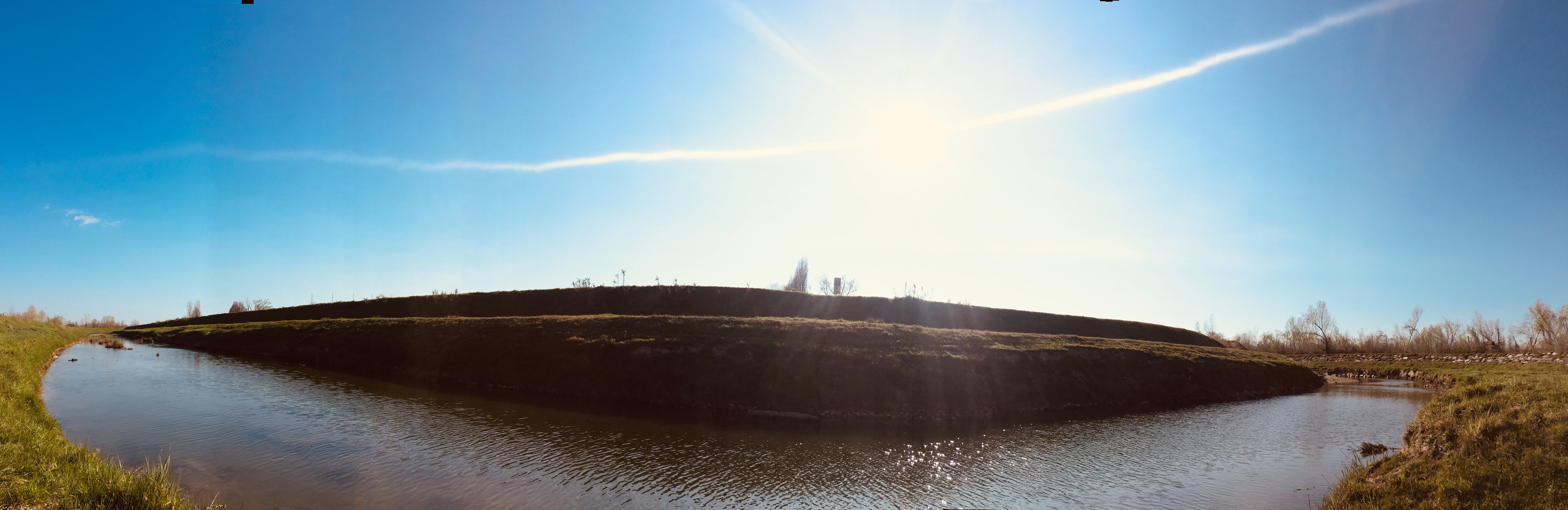
- Location: Tuscany, Italy
- Coordinates: 43°59′30.54″N 10°10′02.3″E
- Type: Lake

Location
- Interactive map of Lago di Porta

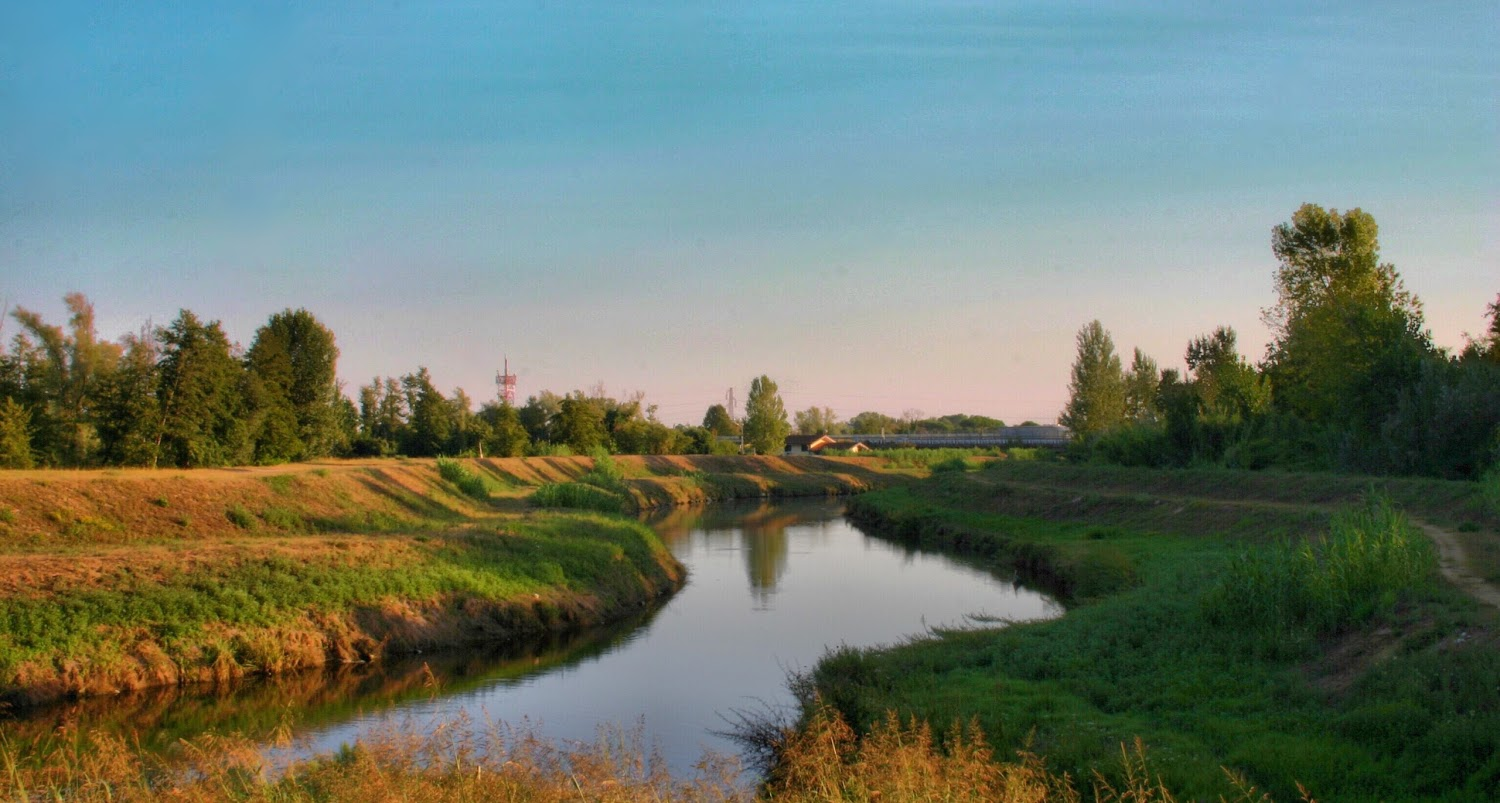

The Lago di Porta is a lake in Tuscany.

It is covered by two contiguous protected areas, managed jointly under a single regulation approved by both involved municipal administrations:

- the ANPIL Lago di Porta, in the Municipality of Montignoso in the Province of Massa-Carrara
- the ANPIL Lago e Rupi di Porta, in the Municipality of Pietrasanta in the Province of Lucca.

== Hydrography ==
Its water supply is ensured by springs at the foot of the hills: one of these is located near the Torre Medicea in Porta Beltrame, with a constant temperature of about 17 °C (63 °F). The Fossa Fiorentina (the inflow of Lago di Porta) collects water from the springs and two small channels (the Rio di Pettinaiola and the Canal Ginesi), and its outflow is a small ditch that flows into the Montignoso stream, just before it joins the Versilia river.

== History ==
=== Roman period ===
During Roman domination, the ancient Via Aurelia passed through the area (a road still exists, called Stradavecchia romana, which is likely the ancient Aurelia) and was part of the territory of the colony of Luni; the area between Montiscendi and Lago di Porta was used for the centuriation system.

=== Middle Ages ===
Initially, it was a system of ponds and marshes (including coastal ones). The first records of Lago di Porta date back to a historical document from 1244 that mentioned border disputes between the Nobili di Corvaia and Montignoso. The first act mentioning Lago di Porta was in 1329, when it was granted as a fief to Perotto dello Strego.

It was called the lake of Porta Beltrame because, since 1055, there was evidence of a gate along the Via Francigena, which served as a customs post. In the medieval period, near the lake along the Via Francigena, the church of Santa Maria di Porta and an inn were built, where travelers could find rest. Since the 14th century, Lago di Porta has been noted for its abundance of fish and for the surrounding "prata" (meadows used for grazing), "pagliareti" (reedy areas), and "campi" (fields); however, the inhabitants of Montignoso could only use the land, as they did not have fishing rights.

Fish caught in Lago di Porta was sold in Lucca: according to a quote by Giovanni Sforza from 1867, in 1391, the fish from Lago di Porta was paid three soldi and six denari. In 1405, Lago di Porta passed entirely to Pietrasanta due to a ruling by Paolo Guinigi, and in 1406, Perotto’s heirs, due to debts, ceded the fishing rights to their creditors, who then transferred them to the Misericordia hospital in Lucca for 2400 gold scudi.

=== 16th, 17th, and 18th centuries ===
In 1513, the lake passed to the Florentines along with Pietrasanta. In the 16th century, Lago di Porta was used both for fishing and as a natural harbor for small boats through the sea outlet; however, the Versilia river and the Pannosa stream caused problems for the population around the lake due to continuous flooding, and in 1548, tensions almost led to clashes between the Lucca community of Montignoso and the Tuscan community of Pietrasanta over the new land emerged due to the lake’s retreat caused by the Pannosa’s floods; a ruling in 1550 reestablished the boundaries as they were in 1244 and 1405. In 1569, a seven-meter-wide channel was completed, passing through Querceta, which diverted part of the Versilia river’s floodwaters into Lago di Porta. In 1592, only the Pietrasanta residents were allowed to fish with rods in Lago di Porta. In 1593, the Pannosa managed to flow into Lago di Porta, after numerous floods and devastations, creating a new riverbed.

In 1599, a convention known as the "composizione dei falaschi" was established, defining the territories that could be exploited by the communities of Montignoso and Massa: the Montignoso community got the area closest to the mouth, and the Massa community got the Campaccio area. This convention was intended to last five years but was so satisfactory that it was maintained until 1798.

In the 17th century, land reclamation works were initiated to obtain land for wheat cultivation, as Pietrasanta needed it and due to malaria. The Versilia river, despite the channel dug in 1569, continued to flood the plain, until the General Council of Pietrasanta decided in 1655 to channel it into the lake. This had two consequences, one negative and one positive: on one hand, the river’s sediments began to fill the lake, damaging fishing; on the other, new land was available for cultivation.

The Pannosa was successfully returned to its original course after an initial failed attempt, as the Montignoso community alone could not bear the costs, though it was not entirely prevented from overflowing. In 1681, the Pietrasanta community managed to repurchase the fishing rights from the Misericordia hospital in Lucca for one hundred and fifty years, with the consent of the Republic of Lucca.

In 1688, the inhabitants of Montignoso were also allowed to fish in the lake from their shore. From then on, there were numerous cases of poaching from the Pietrasanta side in the more fish-abundant areas.

In 1704, the reclamation works of the Pietrasanta plain were completed, progressively eliminating the various coastal marshes and diverting the Versilia river into Lago di Porta. However, the Pannosa continued to cause problems, while the Republic of Lucca showed little interest, carrying out only routine maintenance works.

=== 19th century ===
Between 1808 and 1812, to eliminate the malaria scourge, sluices were built in Cinquale, and reclamation works were initiated by Elisa Bonaparte Baciocchi: after these interventions, malaria disappeared, and the population around the lake increased. Malaria reappeared when rice cultivation began near Lago di Porta in 1838. In 1844, the Treaty of Florence was signed, sanctioning the division of the fragmented border areas between the Duchy of Modena, the Grand Duchy of Tuscany, the Duchy of Lucca, soon to revert to Tuscany, and the Duchy of Parma, led by the Bourbon-Parma, temporarily settled in Lucca, who would take over after the death of the reigning Marie Louise: in particular, Modena, which had absorbed the Duchy of Massa and Carrara in 1829, was assigned, among other things, the Lucca exclave of Montignoso, including the entire lake and surrounding area, including the Pietrasanta portion, and the Cinquale Fort, where the duke wanted to build a port. In return, the Grand Duchy of Tuscany managed to retain control of the Pietrasanta captaincy, which the Congress of Vienna had assigned to Modena, through a cross-exchange of territories: Tuscany ceded the Lunigiana exclave of Pontremoli to Parma, and Parma ceded the former Duchy of Guastalla to Modena, thus compensating it for renouncing Pietrasanta. In 1847, the treaty was finally implemented, including a clause prohibiting rice cultivation. After twelve years, both the Montignoso and Pietrasanta territories became part of the newly formed Kingdom of Italy, as part of the United Provinces of Central Italy.

=== World War II ===
The Montignoso territory was severely affected during World War II, as the Gothic Line passed through it, and some damage also affected the water containment and channeling structures towards the sea.

=== 2000 to today ===
The area is now sufficiently reclaimed, and local authorities have decided to transform the reclaimed area, full of formerly illegal homes, into a partially residential zone (new building permits and mostly public housing for non-EU citizens) and a partially artisanal development zone.

Regarding the still marshy area, it was decided to surround it with a dirt road adjacent to the embankments, designated for recreational use (walks and other activities).

=== Establishment of the Local Interest Natural Protected Area (A.N.P.I.L.) “LAGO DI PORTA” ===
In 1998, the municipalities of Montignoso and Pietrasanta established the Local Interest Natural Protected Area (A.N.P.I.L.) “LAGO DI PORTA”, defining its boundaries and setting up a management committee composed of representatives from the municipalities of Pietrasanta and Montignoso, the Province of Lucca, the Province of Massa-Carrara, and environmental associations. From 1998 to 2012, the presidency was held by Montignoso, and since 2012, it has been held by Pietrasanta.

== Fauna ==
Birds: the protected area hosts many species typical of the marsh environment. In autumn and winter, the area is inhabited by the cormorant, teal, water pipit, starling, and bittern. In spring and summer, the area also hosts the barn swallow, house martin, Cetti’s warbler, little bittern, purple heron, night heron, great reed warbler, reed warbler, bee-eater, squacco heron, sedge warbler, and reed bunting. Migratory species include the shoveler, garganey, and yellow wagtail. Present year-round are the mallard, grey heron, coot, little grebe, water rail, moorhen, kingfisher, grasshopper warbler, penduline tit, marsh harrier (nesting with one pair), little egret, cattle egret, moustached warbler, oriental turtle dove, kestrel, and wood pigeon. In the woodland, there are the nightingale, chaffinch, great tit, spotted flycatcher, great spotted woodpecker, magpie, carrion crow, nuthatch, and wryneck. Nesting species include the little bittern, purple heron, grey heron, night heron, and squacco heron, forming a small but significant heronry.

Fish: the lake is home to the pike, bleak, chub, and carp.

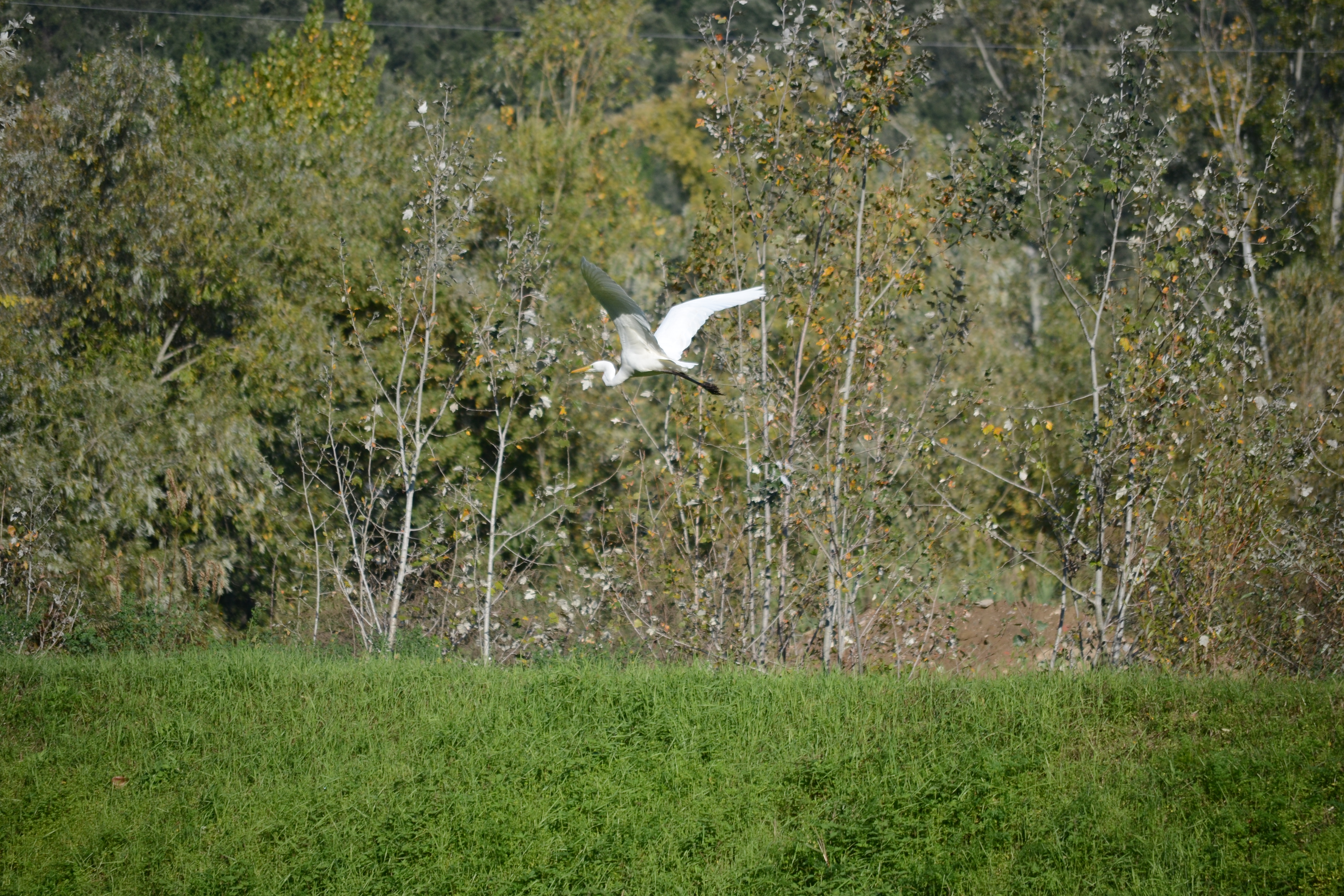
Great egret

Reptiles: the area hosts the grass snake, pond turtle, and green lizard.

Amphibians: the wetland is home to the green frog, tree frog, and crested newt.

Mammals: the area is inhabited by specimens of nutria and badger.

Insects: the area is home to the Lycaena dispar, a rare butterfly, and during spring and summer, many dragonflies can be seen.

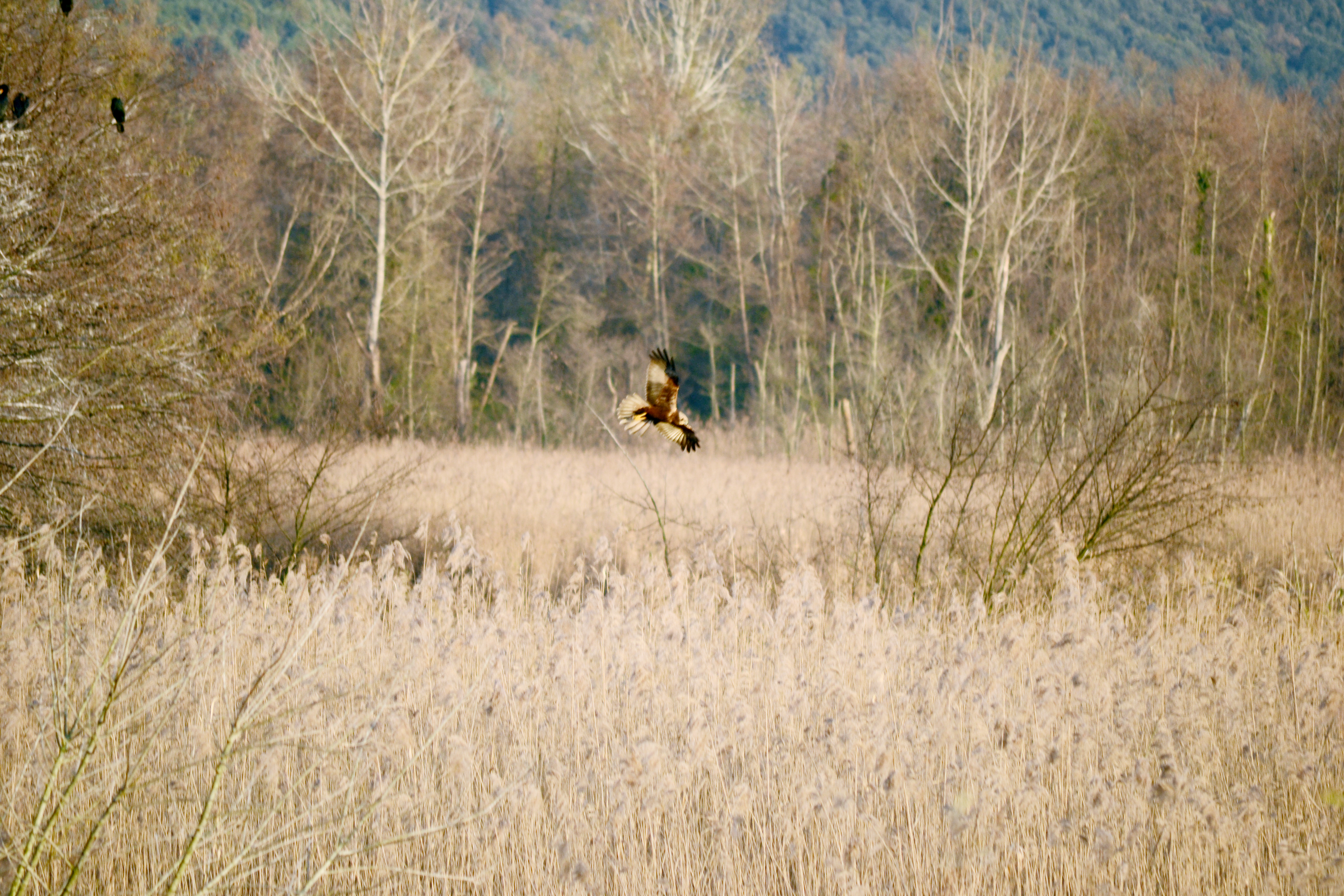
A marsh harrier at Lago di Porta

== Flora ==
In the wetland, there are the white willow, white poplar, birch, hawthorn, yellow iris, wild angelica, elder, dogwood, blackberry, sedges, rushes, and common reed. Additionally, in the wetland, there are wooded areas (the recently formed woodland around the reed bed and lakebed recalls the original environment of the historical Versilia plain, characterized by marshes, ponds, and dunes) and marshy areas (divided into reed beds and sedge areas). There are also many plant varieties along and within the ditches of Lago di Porta: in particular, there are several floating aquatic plants in the Fossa Fiorentina, including common chickweed, water-starwort, zannichellia, and hornwort. On the banks of this ditch, there is water-soldier. Also present are the aquatic orchid and the marsh orchid: in the local dialect, orchids are called "caprette".

== Bibliography ==
- Lago di Porta, viaggio fra storia e natura [Lago di Porta, a journey through history and nature] (in Italian). 2001.
- Le piante palustri utilizzate nelle attività tradizionali locali [Marsh plants used in traditional local activities] (in Italian). 2006.
- Le farfalle diurne del Lago di Porta [The diurnal butterflies of Lago di Porta] (in Italian). 2009.
- Puglisi, Luca (2009). Gli uccelli del Lago di Porta [The birds of Lago di Porta] (PDF) (in Italian). Archived from the original (PDF) on 2014-08-11.
- del Freo, Giuseppe (2009). Breve storia del lago di Porta [A brief history of Lago di Porta] (PDF) (in Italian). Archived from the original (PDF) on 2012-04-17.
- Vietina, Barbara (2009). Flora e Vegetazione [Flora and Vegetation] (PDF) (in Italian). Archived from the original (PDF) on 2012-04-17.
