= Raf (singer) =

Italian singer-songwriter (born 1959)

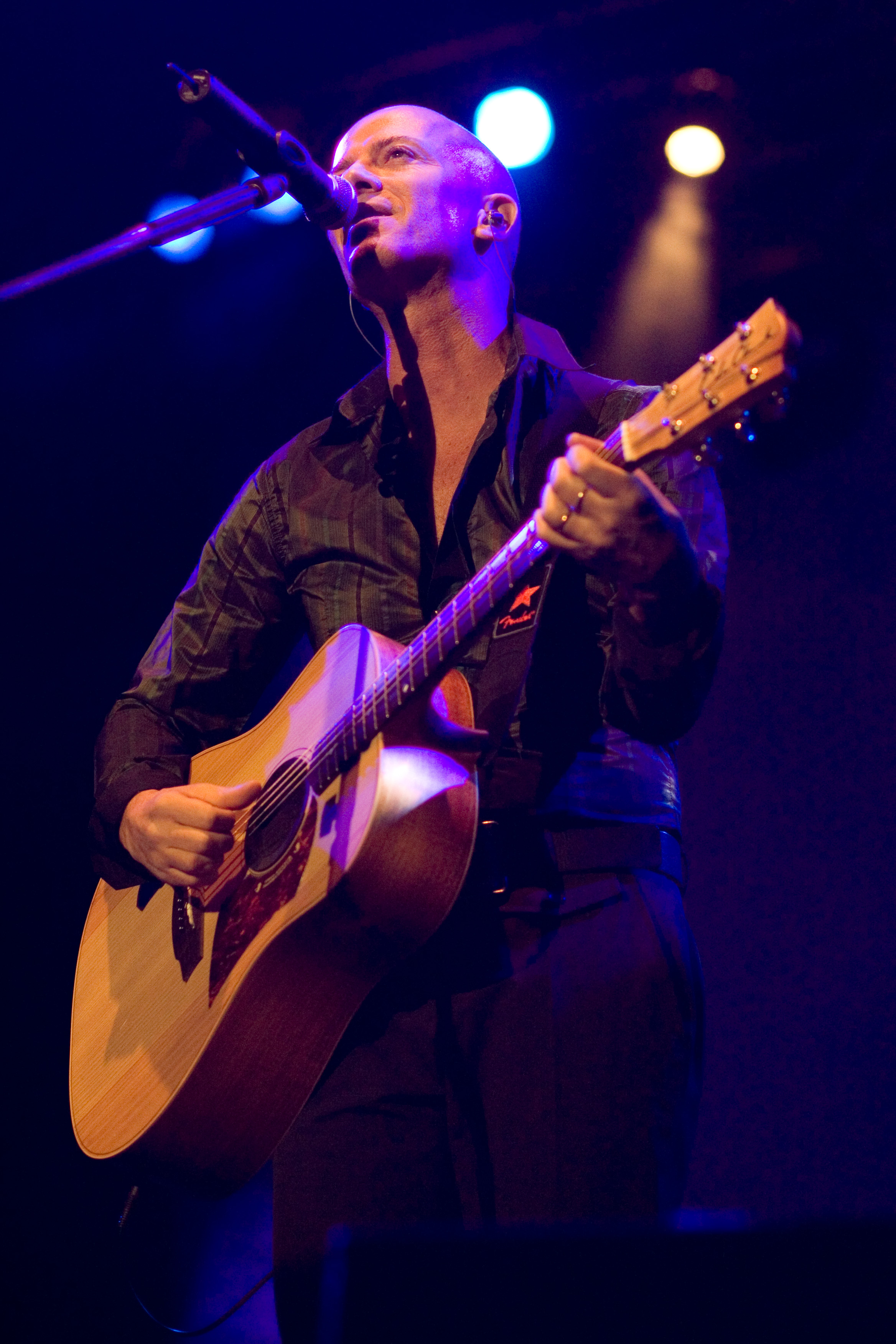
- Raf in concert in 2006

Background information
- Also known as: Raff
- Born: Raffaele Riefoli; 29 September 1959 (age 67)
- Origin: Margherita di Savoia, Apulia, Italy
- Genres: Pop rock; soft rock; new wave; Italo disco (early work); jazz fusion
- Occupation: Singer-songwriter
- Instruments: Vocals; guitar
- Years active: 1983–present
- Labels: Carrere; East West; Columbia
- Website: www.raf.it

Raffaele Riefoli (born 29 September 1959), known as simply Raf, is an Italian singer-songwriter. He first became known in the early 1980s as a singer of Italo disco and as original singer and co-author of the hit "Self Control". He has turned to Italian-language music since the late 1980s and had further hits in his home country.

== Biography ==
Riefoli lived the few first years of the 1980s in London, before starting out his musical career in 1984, landing mostly in the new wave scene with his English language debut album, Raf. His first single, "Self Control", which he co-wrote with Giancarlo Bigazzi and Steve Piccolo, was a huge hit not only in his native Italy but also in Austria (No. 7), Switzerland (No. 1) and Germany, where the single climbed as high as No. 2 in the Media Control single chart and spent a total of seven weeks within the Top 10. Raf's version of the song also managed to enter the Top-40 in France.

"Self Control" was recorded and released contemporaneously by American pop star Laura Branigan, previously best known for the hit singles "Gloria" (another cover version originally released by Italian singer Umberto Tozzi) and "How Am I Supposed to Live Without You". Branigan's version was released as the first single off her 1984 album, also titled Self Control, and became a worldwide dance and pop success, hitting No. 4 on the Billboard Hot 100 in the U.S. Branigan's version hit the No. 1 spot in Germany, Austria, Switzerland, Sweden, South Africa and Canada, and was a major hit in Ireland, Australia, France, the Netherlands and the UK. Raf's version, which was charting high in numerous markets in 1984/85, was highly expected to become the most popular song in the history of the Italian music industry.

Other English-language singles from Raf, "Change Your Mind", "London Town" and "Hard", were not as successful, and after an unsuccessful 1987 re-release of his first album with two of these songs as bonus tracks, Riefoli began to transition from the new wave/dance-pop genre into a softer pop style featuring vocals in his native language. Raf has released 11 studio albums throughout the years, including the 1993 Cannibali, which has been certified six times platinum in Italy. That album contains many successful tracks including "Il battito animale", "Due" and "Stai con me".

Riefoli has also written songs for other Italian artists; the track "Si può dare di più", written for the trio Morandi–Ruggeri–Tozzi, won the first prize at the Sanremo Music Festival 1984. Riefoli co-wrote the song "Gente di mare" with Umberto Tozzi and Giancarlo Bigazzi, and his duet with Tozzi became Italy's entry in the Eurovision Song Contest 1987, placing third. The recording was a top ten hit in Switzerland, Austria and Sweden.

In the German-speaking territories, where the West German Red Army Faction, listed as a terrorist cell, was popularly known by the acronym RAF, Riefoli was marketed as Raff, with a second "f". In the intervening years, a number of other artists including German and Italian artists unaffiliated with Riefoli have made recordings under the names Raf, RAF or R.A.F.

Raf continues to have a successful recording career in Italy with his latest studio albums, Metamorfosi (2008), Numeri (2011) and Le ragioni del cuore (2012), reaching No. 4, No. 6 and No. 13 respectively in the Italian album charts.

On 30 November 2025, he was announced among the participants of the Sanremo Music Festival 2026. He competed with the song "Ora e per sempre".

== Discography ==
=== Studio albums ===
Title	Album details	Peak chart positions	
Title	Album details	ITA	SUI
Raf	Released: 1984; Label: Carrere; Formats: Cassette, CD, LP		
Self Control	Released: 1987; Label: Carrere; Formats: Cassette, CD, LP		
Svegliarsi un anno fa	Released: 16 May 1988; Label: Warner; Formats: Cassette, CD, LP	—	—
Cosa resterà...	Released: 7 February 1989; Label: Warner; Formats: Cassette, CD, LP	7	—
Sogni ...è tutto quello che c'è	Released: 1 March 1991; Label: Warner; Formats: Cassette, CD, LP	6	—
Cannibali	Released: May 1993; Label: East West (Warner); Formats: Cassette, CD, LP	5	—
Manifesto	Released: 8 June 1995; Label: East West (Warner); Formats: Cassette, CD, LP	5	—
La prova	Released: 19 November 1998; Label: East West (Warner); Formats: Cassette, CD, LP	17	—
Iperbole	Released: 1 June 2001; Label: East West (Warner); Formats: Cassette, CD	3	75
Ouch	Released: 14 May 2004; Label: Columbia (Sony BMG); Formats: Cassette, CD	7	90
Passeggeri distratti	Released: 26 May 2006; Label: Columbia (Sony BMG); Formats: CD, digital download	3	—
Metamorfosi	Released: 20 September 2008; Label: Columbia (Sony BMG); Formats: CD, digital download	4	—
Numeri	Released: 10 May 2011; Label: Columbia (Sony Music); Formats: CD, LP, digital download	6	—
Sono io	Released: 30 June 2015; Label: Universal Music Italy; Formats: CD, digital download	7	—
"—" denotes items that did not chart or were not released.

=== Compilation albums ===
Title	Album details	Peak chart positions	Certifications
Title	Album details	ITA	Certifications
Collezione temporanea	Released: 3 October 1996; Label: Warner; Formats: Cassette, CD, LP	5	
Le ragioni del cuore	Released: 9 October 2012; Label: Columbia (Sony Music); Formats: CD, Digital download	7	
Raf Tozzi	Released: 30 November 2018; Label: Sugar; Formats: CD, Digital download	24	

=== Live albums ===
Title	Album details	Peak chart positions
Title	Album details	ITA
Soundview	Released: 30 October 2009; Label: Colombia (Sony BMG); Formats: CD, Digital Download	29
Due, la nostra storia	Released: 29 November 2019; Label: Friends & Partners; Formats: CD, Digital Download	47

== Singles ==
=== As lead artist ===
Title	Year	Peak chart positions					Album
Title	Year	ITA	AUT	FRA	GER	SUI	Album
"Self Control"	1984	1	7	40	2	1	Raf
"I Don't Want to Lose You"	1985	36	—	—	—	—	Raf
"Change Your Mind"	1985	18	—	—	19	—	Raf
"Hard"	1985	—	—	—	—	—	Raf
"London Town"	1987	32	—	—	—	—	Raf
"Inevitabile follia"	1988	10	—	—	—	—	Svegliarsi un anno fa
"Svegliarsi un anno fa"	1988	39	—	—	—	—	Svegliarsi un anno fa
"La Battaglia del sesso"	1989	—	—	—	—	—	Cosa resterà...
"Cosa resterà degli anni '80"	1989	6	—	—	—	—	Cosa resterà...
"Ti pretendo"	1989	2	—	—	—	—	Cosa resterà...
"E' meglio così "	1991	—	—	—	—	—	Sogni ...è tutto quello che c'è
"Interminatamente"	1991	3	—	—	—	—	Sogni ...è tutto quello che c'è
"Oggi un dio non-ho"	1991	3	—	—	—	—	Sogni ...è tutto quello che c'è
"Senza respiro"	1991	22	—	—	—	—	Sogni ...è tutto quello che c'è
"Siamo soli nell'immenso vuoto che c'è"	1991	3	—	—	—	—	Sogni ...è tutto quello che c'è
"Anche tu"(Raf featuring Eros Ramazzotti)	1991	—	—	—	—	—	Sogni ...è tutto quello che c'è
"Il Battito animale"	1993	4	—	—	—	—	Cannibali
"Cannibali"	1993	—	—	—	—	—	Cannibali
"Il Canto"	1993	—	—	—	—	—	Cannibali
"Due"	1993	5	—	—	—	—	Cannibali
"Stai con me"	1994	20	—	—	—	—	Cannibali
"Dentro ai tuoi occhi"	1995	—	—	—	—	—	Manifesto
"Il Suono c'è"	1995	—	—	—	—	—	Manifesto
"Un Grande salto"	1996	—	—	—	—	—	Collezione temporanea
"Lava"	1998	—	—	—	—	—	La prova
"La Danza della pioggia"	1999	—	—	—	—	—	La prova
"Infinito"	2001	1	—	—	—	89	Iperbole
"Via"	2001	19	—	—	—	—	Iperbole
"In tutti i miei giorni"	2004	7	—	—	—	—	Ouch
"Superstiti"	2004	—	—	—	—	—	Ouch
"Dimentica"	2006	4	—	—	—	—	Passeggeri distratti
"Passeggeri distratti"	2006	23	—	—	—	—	Passeggeri distratti
"Ossigeno"	2008	12	—	—	—	—	Metamorfosi
"Non è mai un errore"	2008	12	—	—	—	—	Metamorfosi
"Ballo"	2009	—	—	—	—	—	Metamorfosi
"Per tutto il tempo"	2009	47	—	—	—	—	Soundview
"Un'emozione inaspettata"	2011	28	—	—	—	—	Numeri
"Le ragioni del cuore"	2012	49	—	—	—	—	Le ragioni del cuore
"Show Me the Way to Heaven" (Raf vs. F-Clef)	2014	35	—	—	—	—	Non-album single
"Come una favola"	2015	42	—	—	—	—	Sono io
"Rimani tu"	2015	—	—	—	—	—	Sono io
"Eclissi totale"	2015	—	—	—	—	—	Sono io
"Arcobaleni"	2015	—	—	—	—	—	Sono io
"Come una danza" (featuring Umberto Tozzi)	2018	—	—	—	—	—	Non-album singles
"Samurai" (with D'art)	2019	—	—	—	—	—	Non-album singles
"Liberi" (with Danti and Fabio Rovazzi)	2020	—	—	—	—	—	Non-album singles
"Cherie"	2022	—	—	—	—	—	Non-album singles
"80 voglia di te"	2023	—	—	—	—	—	Non-album singles
"Ora e per sempre"	2026	31	—	—	—	—	Non-album singles

=== As featured artist ===
Title	Year	Peak chart positions			Album
Title	Year	ITA	GER	SUI	Album
"Gente di mare" (Umberto Tozzi e Raf)	1987	—	—	—	Non-album track
"Tu vivrai" (Pooh, Eros Ramazzotti, Enrico Ruggeri, Raf, Umberto Tozzi)	1990	—	—	—	Non-album track
"Per la gloria" (Mario Lavezzi, Gianni Bella, Riccardo Cocciante, G. Combo, Mango, Raf)	1991	—	—	—	Non-album track
"Mi rubi l'anima" (Laura Pausini featuring Raf)	1993	—	—	—	Laura Pausini
"Come una danza" (Raf featuring Umberto Tozzi)	2018	—	—	—	

Preceded by Romina Power & Al Bano	Italy in the Eurovision Song Contest; 1987 (with Umberto Tozzi)	Succeeded by Luca Barbarossa
