= Albert Malaspina =

Italian composer

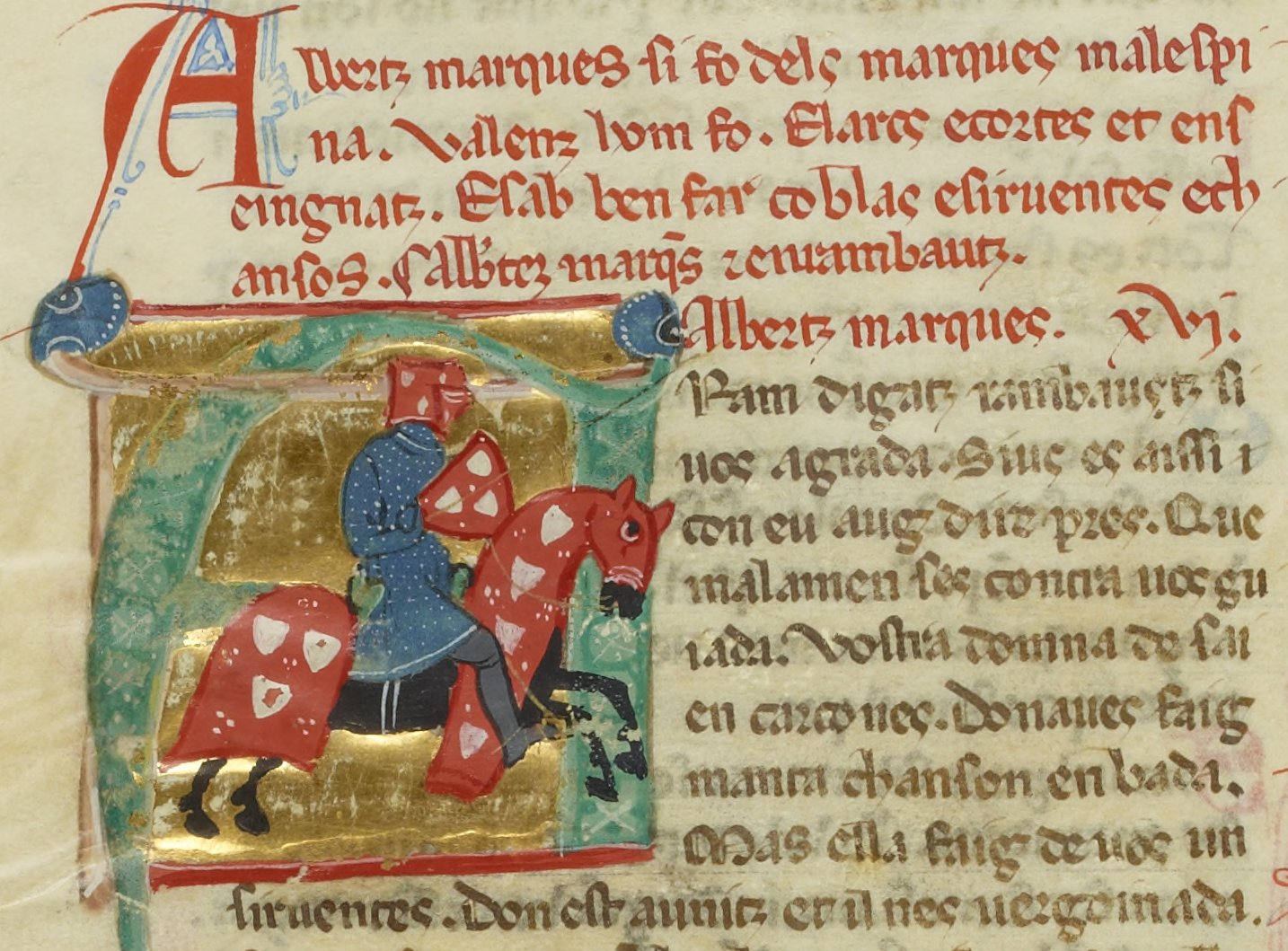
Albertz marqus si fo del marques malespina, valenz hom fo. "Albert the marchese was from the Malaspina marchesi, a brave man was he."

Albert Malaspina (1160/1165–1206/1212), called Alberto Moro ("the Moor") and lo marches putanier ("the whoring marquess"), was a member of the illustrious Malaspina family. He was a noted troubadour and patron of troubadours. Albert disputes with Peire de la Caravana the position of earliest native Italian troubadour.

He was a son of Obizzo I the Great and husband of a daughter of William V of Montferrat. His brother-in-law Boniface I of Montferrat and his nephews Corrado (Conrad) and Guglielmo (William) were all enthusiastic patrons of troubadours. He was renowned for his bravery, generosity, courtliness, and learning. He composed a tenso with Raimbaut de Vaqueiras that begins Ara'm digatz Raimbaut, si vos agrada. Though this is the only work of his to survive, the author of his vida compliments his couplets, cansos, and sirventes.

According to Raimbaut, in his famous "epic letter" Valen marques, senher de Monferrat, in the 1170s Albert abducted Saldina de Mar, a daughter of a prominent Genoese family only to have her rescued by Boniface of Montferrat who restored her to her lover, Ponset d'Aguilar.

Albert's wife was possibly the trobairitz known only as Ysabella.

== Sources ==
- The Vidas of the Troubadours. Margarita Egan, trans. New York: Garland, 1984. ISBN 0-8240-9437-9.
