= Il battito animale =

Single by Raf

from the album Cannibali
- Released: 1993
- Length: 4:30
- Label: CGD / Sugar Music
- Songwriter(s): Raf, Cheope
- Producer(s): Raf

Raf singles chronology
"Senza respiro" (1991)	"Il battito animale" (1993)	"Due" (1993)

Music video
- "Il battito animale" on YouTube

"Il battito animale" (lit. "The animal heartbeat") is a 1993 Italian song composed by Cheope and Raf and performed by Raf.

The leading single of Raf's album Cannibali, the song was a major summer hit, and won the 30th Festivalbar. At the time of its release, it has been described as "intriguing" and "a novelty compared to the usual trends of Italian music".

== Track listing ==
No.	Title	Writer(s)	Length
1.	"Il Battito Animale (Remix)"	Cheope, Raf	5:40
2.	"Il Battito Animale (Tribale / Tam Tam Mix)"	Cheope, Raf	4:24
3.	"Il Battito Animale (Radio Mix)"	Cheope, Raf	4:20

== Charts ==
Chart (1993)	Peak position
Europe (European Hot 100 Singles)	75
Italy (Musica e dischi)	4
