= Conrad Malaspina the Elder =

Italian nobleman

Conrad Malaspina, also known as L'Antico or The Old, was an Italian nobleman who lived in the 12th century. There is no certainty about Conrad's birthdate but most historians agree that it is around 1180, his death date is also uncertain but it is speculated to be around July 1254. Conrad was the forefather of the "Spino Secco" (dried thorn in English) branch of the Malaspina family. Conrad Malaspina's achievements were of fundamental importance for the way Italian territories were shaped. He had very close relationships with Emperor Frederick II as well as many intellectuals and political figures of the time.

Coat of arms of the House of Malaspina (Spino Secco)

== Biography ==
He was born approximately around 1180, his father was Obizzo II Malaspina (died circa 1193). He started his diplomatic career in 1198 when he himself confirmed the attornment of the knolls of the “Court of Gondola” to the city of Piacenza. The juridical procedures needed for this attornment had started to be composed years before by his uncles Alberto Malaspina and Morroello Malaspina. His diplomatic career hence began under the supervision of his uncles, who, until he turned 18, were acting in his name, he also worked alongside his cousins, they were tied by their common ancestor, the marques Obizzo I. In the period they worked together they had an intense diplomatic activity trying to solve the contrasts that arose with the Count-Bishop of the diocese of “Luni”, consequentially they signed agreements with the cities of Genoa, Milan, Piacenza, Tortona and Modena.

== The controversy with the Count-Bishop of the diocese of “Luni” ==
Starting from the last decade of the XIIIth century the Malaspina family began to have some contrasts with the Count-Bishop of the diocese of “Luni” because of the considerable richness in lands they had acquired from the d’Este family, that had previously stolen them from the da Vezzano family. By 1202 a compromise was found: the parties agreed on reciprocal defense within the borders of the diocese of “Luni” as well as the equal division of the contended lands, under the promise that the bishop would pay an initial amount of money plus a yearly tax.

== Other Agreements ==
Between 1210 and 1218 Conrad signed several agreements. Between 1210 and 1212 he signed pacts with Piacenza, Milan and Tortona to ensure the safety of Lombard merchants traveling on the Apennine roads. The Malaspina family was a strong supporter of Emperor Otto von Brunswick in his contrast against pope Innocent the third, Pavia and the marquessate of Monferrato. Even if Emperor Otto von Brunswick lost in the battle of Bouvines in 1214 the Malaspina family kept fighting against Pavia, which was impeding pilgrims from reaching Rome, siding with Milan and afterwards Piacenza. Between 1215 and 1216 Conrad tried to seize some strategic positions on the eastern coast of Liguria thus causing Genoa to react. On both the Genovese and Pavia’s front peace was achieved between 1217 and 1218.

== The birth of the “Spino Secco” branch ==
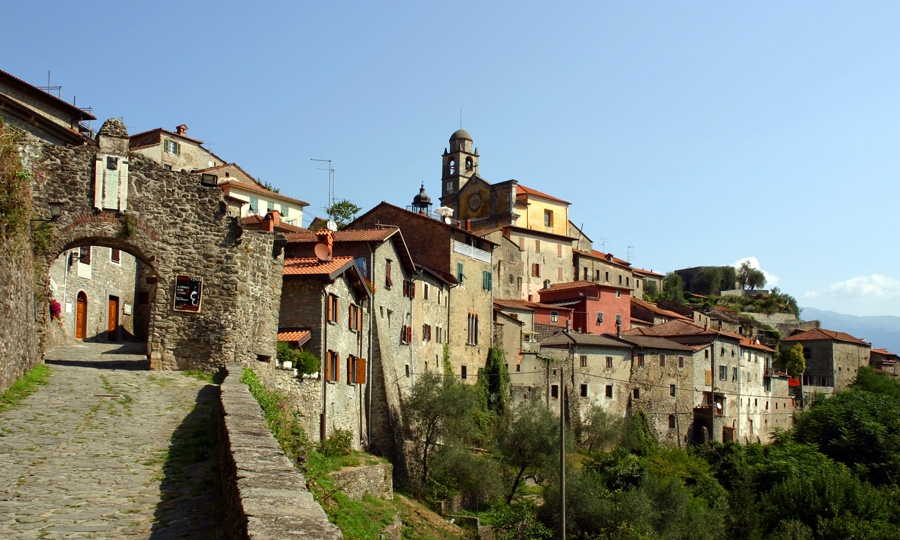
The city of Mulazzo

Between April and August 1221 Conrad and his cousin Obizzo, son of Conrad’s uncle Gugliemo, carried out the first separation of the family’s patrimonial assets. The Malaspina’s family domain was divided in two parts, one belonged to Conrad, who is the founder of the Spino Secco branch, the other belonged to Obizzo, who started the Spino Fiorito branch (Blooming Thorn). Such division was preceded by the preventive splitting of Alberto Malaspina’s heredity between uncle Guglielmo Malaspina and Conrad. Upon request, Emperor Frederic the second in 1220 confirmed the validity of the solution regarding the division of the land owned by Conrad and Obizzo in the territories of Liguria, Lombardy and of Lunigiana. Conrad was entrusted with lands in the “Appennino Lombardo", amongst which: Val Trebbia (valley of the river Trebbia) and the castle of Pregola; in Lunigiana he occupied Mulazzo and the lands on the right of the Magra river.

== The relationship with Emperor Frederick the second ==
The relationship Conrad and his cousin Obizzo started with Emperor Frederick II was very prolific, even though they didn't have a prominent position in his court, they followed him in northern and central Italy during his campaigns. Conrad was at Frederick's side in the battles of Monterosi (1220), Capua (1222) and Pontremoli (1226). Conrad's alliance with Frederick II was briefly interrupted in 1226, because the two cousins sided with Milan and Piacenza, against the Emperial Party. While Obizzo's schism lasted even after the conflict, after a few months, Conrad went back to the emperor's side. Hence in 1248 Frederick II gave all the Lunigiana to Pisa, except for Conrad's land and the castle of Pontremoli, to thank him for his loyalty. After the emperor's death (1250), Conrad went back to his family and managing his possessions, he then helped the Spino Fiorito branch to reestablish its position of power, as reported in a document stating that in 1253 the two cousins occupied for a short period Pontremoli. After July 1254 there are no documents about Conrad's actions but it is known that in 1259 his wife (at the time) Agnesina was widowed (implying his death to be between 1254 and 1259).

== Marriage and Offspring ==
Conrad had 7 children in total: Moroello, Franceschino, Albert, Manfredi, Federico, Selvaggia and Beatrice, he also raised as his own the illegitimate child of his cousin Frederik I Malaspina, Conrad Malaspina (the young) (also known as Corradino). His first wife is thought to be Costanza (daughter of Frederick II) but there is no written document confirming this, in 1259 the existence of a new consort is confirmed, Agnesina.

== The Malaspina family and Patronage ==
The common management of the family's assets and the political strategies, pursued by Conrad, and his uncles Alberto and Guglielmo Malaspina, reflected the spirit of the courtly period in which the family lived. The Malaspina family became patron to several Provençal Troubadours that were travelling to the northern Italian courts. Some of the most famous were: Raimbaut de Vaqueiras, Aimeric de Pegulhan, Abertet de Sisteron and Guilhelm de la Tor. To the family members were dedicated several songs, sirventes and tensos, many of which had a political topic.

== Dante’s Homage ==
In the eighth chant of the Purgatory, Dante Alighieri celebrates their courtly values, especially liberality and hospitality, that were well known in the entirety of Europe.

=== Original version ===
La fama che la vostra casa onora,
grida i segnori e grida la contrada,
sì che ne sa chi non vi fu ancora; e io vi giuro, s'io di sopra vada,
che vostra gente onrata non si sfregia
del pregio de la borsa e de la spada.
(Divina Commedia, Purgatorio, Dante Alighieri, Canto 8, Vv. 121–129)

=== English translation ===
“Oh!” said I then to him, "I 've never been
in your domains, but where throughout all Europe
dwelleth a man who knows them not? The fame
which honoreth your house, proclaims its lords,
proclaims its district, so that even he
knows of them, who hath never been there yet.
I swear to you, so may I go on high,
that of the glorious use of purse and sword
your honored race doth not despoil itself.
(Divine Comedy, Purgatory, Dante Alighieri, 8th Chant, Vv. 121–129)

== Bibliography ==
- Historia diplomatica Friderici secundi sive Constitutiones, privilegia, mandata, instrumenta quae supersunt istius imperatoris et filiorum ejus: accedunt epistolae Papam et documenta varia collegit ad fidem chartarum et codicemrecensuit juxta seriem annorum disposuit et notis illustravit, J. L. A. Huillard-Bréholles, Parisiis 1852–1861, ad annum.
- Historiae Patriae Monumenta, Chartarum, II, Torino 1853, n. 1270.
- Annales Mediolanenses minores. Memoriae Mediolanenses, in Monumenta Germaniae Historica Scriptores, ed. G. H. Pertz, Hannoverae 1863, XVIII, p. 401.
- Annales Placentini Gibellini, in Monumenta Germaniae Historica Scriptores, ed. G. H. Pertz, Hannover 1863, XVIII, 469–481.
- Annales Placentini Guelfi, in Monumenta Germaniae Historica Scriptores, ed. G. H. Pertz, Hannover 1863, XVIII, 431–432.
- Actaimperii inedita saeculi XIII. Urkunden und Briefe zur Geschicthte des Kaiserreichs und des Königreichs Sicilien in den Jahren 1198–1273, ed.E. Winckelmann, Innsbruck 1880–1885, 1, 358–359; II, 13–14.
- Giovanni Codagnello, Annales Placentini, ed O. Holder-Egger, in Monumenta Germaniae Historica Scriptores rerum germanicarum in usum scholarum XXIII, Hannoverae 1901, 18, 55, 92.
- Annali Genovesi di Caffaro e de' suoi continuatori, a cura di L. T. Belgrano, e C. Imperiale di Sant'Angelo, voll II-IV, Roma 1901–1926, ad annum.
- A. Ferretto, Documenti intorno ai trovatori Percivalle e Simone Doria, in Studi medievali, I (1904–1905), p. 130, n.VII.
- G. Gorrini, Documenti sulle relazioni tra Voghera e Genova (960–1325), in Bollettino Storico Bibliografico Subalpino, XLVIII (1908), nn. XXXI, CLII, CLXXVIII-CLXXX, CLXXXVIII CCXVIII-CCXIX.
- M. Lupo Gentile, Il regesto del codice Pelavicino, in Atti della Società Ligure di Storia Patria, XLIV (1912).
- Il Registrum Magnum del Comune di Piacenza, a cura di E. Falcone e R. Peveri, Milano 1984-1986 voce Malaspina dell'indice.
- M. N. Conti, Le carte anteriori al 1400 nell'archivio malaspiniano di Caniparola nel repertorio del 1760, Pontremoli 1988.
- I Libri Iurium della Repubblica di Genova, Roma 1992–2000, voce Malaspina dell'indice.
- A. Grossi, Il ‘Liber iurium' del Comune di Lodi, Roma-Lodi 2004, n. 3.
- Dante Alighieri, La Divina Commedia, ed. G. Petrocchi, Torino 1975.
- T. Porcacchi, Historia dell'origine et successione dell'illustrissima famiglia Malaspina, descritta da Thomaso Porcacchi da Castiglione Arretino, et mandata in luce da Aurora Bianca d'Este sua consorte, Verona 1585.
- P. Litta, Famiglie celebri italiane. Malaspina, Milano 1852, tavola II.
- E. Branchi, Storia della Lunigiana feudale, Pistoia 1897-1899, I, 134–165.
- G. L. Mannucci, I marchesi Malaspina e i poeti provenzali, in Dante e la Lunigiana, Milano 1909, 35–88.
- G. Volpe, Lunigiana medievale, Firenze 1923.
- G. R. Sarolli, L'aula malaspiniana nei secoli XII-XIII, in Rendiconti dell'Istituto Lombardo di Scienze e Lettere e Arti", LXXXIV (1957), 167–178.
- G. Guagnini, I Malaspina, Milano 1973.
- L. Brook, R. Pavoni, Malaspina di Mulazzo, in Genealogie medievali di Sardegna, ed. L. Brook, F. C. Casula, M. M. Costa e A. M. Oliva. Cagliari-Sassari 1984, 307–318.
- R. Pavoni, Signorie feudali fra Genova e Tortona nei secoli XII e XIII, in La Storia dei Genovesi. Atti del IV convegno di studi sui ceti dirigenti nelle istituzioni della Repubblica di Genova Genova 1984, 227–329.
- R. Pavoni, Genova e i Malaspina nei secoli XII e XIII, in La storia dei Genovesi. Atti del VII convegno di studi sui ceti dirigenti nelle istituzioni della Repubblica di Genova, Genova 1987, 281–316.
- G. Fiori, I Malaspina. Castelli e feudi nell'Oltrepo piacentino, pavese, tortonese, Piacenza 1995, Appendice, 275–276.
- N. Tonelli, Purgatorio VIII 46-139: l'incontro con Nino Visconti e Corrado Malaspina, in "Tenzone", 3 (2002), 263–281.
- A. Soddu, I Malaspina nella Sardegna dei giudici (XII-XIII secolo), in "Giornale Storico della Lunigiana", LIV (2003), pp. 190–191.
- G. Caiti-Russo, Les trobadours et la cour des Malaspina, Montpellier 2005.
- A. Soddu, I Malaspina e la Sardegna. Documenti e testi dei secoli XII-XIV, Cagliari 2005, alla voce Malaspina, Corrado dell'indice.
- E. Salvatori, Les Malaspina: bandits de grands chemins ou champions du raffinement courtois? Quelques considérations sur une cour qui a ouvert ses portes aux troubadours (XIIème - XIIIème siècles), in Les élites lettrées, a cura di Patrick Gilli, Montpellier in corso di stampa.
- E. Salvatori, Imperatore e signori nella Lunigiana della prima metà del XIII secolo, in Pier delle Vigne in catene da Borgo San Donnino alla Lunigiana medievale Itinerario alla ricerca dell'identità storica, economica e culturale di un territorio, Sarzana in corso di stampa.
- Enrica Salvatori, MALASPINA, Corrado, in Dizionario biografico degli italiani, vol. 67, Roma, Istituto dell'Enciclopedia Italiana, 2006.
- Malaspina. Canzoni preghiere detti e poesie del reventino
