= Danti =

Danti is an Italian surname. Notable people with this surname include:

- Donald Danti (1993-),
- Davide Danti (1938–2011), Italian illustrator/artist/translator
- Domenico Danti (born 1989), Italian footballer
- Girolamo Danti (1547–1580), Italian painter
- Ignazio Danti, Italian priest, mathematician, astronomer, and cosmographer
- Ignazio Danti (bishop) (1536–1586), Italian bishop
- Nicola Danti (born 1966), Italian politician
- Teodora Danti (c.1498–c.1573), Italian painter
- Vincenzo Danti (1530–1576), Italian sculptor
