= Mulazzo =

- Comune
- Comune di Mulazzo
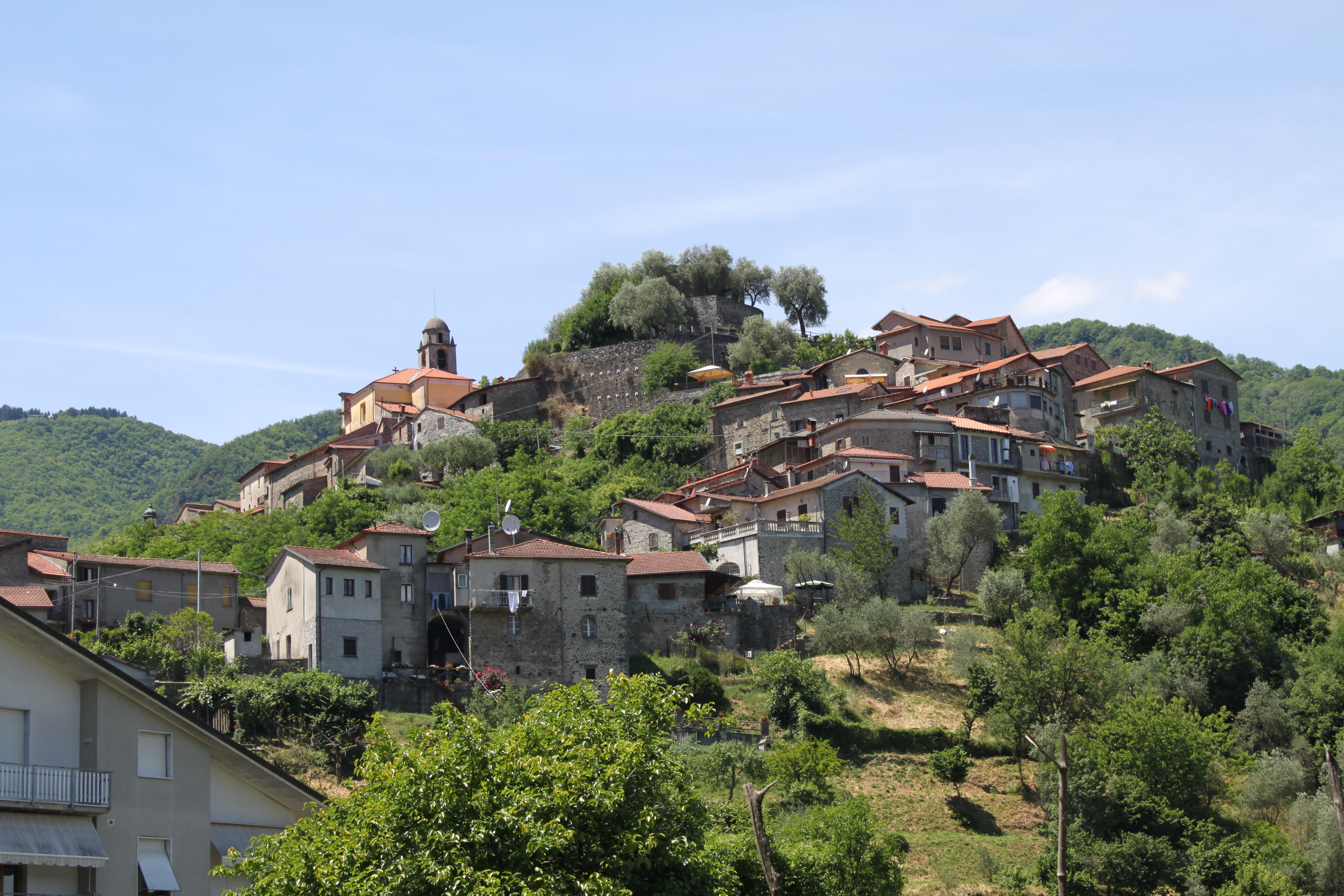
- A view of Mulazzo

- Location within Italy Location within Tuscany
- Coordinates: 44°19′N 9°53′E
- Country: Italy
- Region: Tuscany
- Province: Massa and Carrara (MS)
- Frazioni: Arpiola, Boceda, Busatica, Canossa, Castagnetoli, Castevoli, Gavedo, Groppoli, La Pieve, Lusuolo, Madonna del Monte, Montereggio, Parana, Pozzo.

Government
  - Mayor: Claudio Novoa

Area
  - Total: 62.51 km^{2} (24.14 sq mi)
- Elevation: 351 m (1,152 ft)

Population (31 March 2017)
  - Total: 2,421
  - Density: 38.73/km^{2} (100.3/sq mi)
- Demonym: Mulazzesi
- Time zone: UTC+1 (CET)
  - Summer (DST): UTC+2 (CEST)
- Postal code: 54026
- Dialing code: 0187
- Patron saint: Saint Martin
- Saint day: 11 November
- Website: http://www.comune.mulazzo.ms.it/

Mulazzo is a comune (municipality) in the Province of Massa-Carrara in the Italian region Tuscany, located about 120 kilometres (75 mi) northwest of Florence and about 35 kilometres (22 mi) northwest of Massa.

Mulazzo borders the following municipalities: Calice al Cornoviglio, Filattiera, Pontremoli, Rocchetta di Vara, Tresana, Villafranca in Lunigiana, Zeri.

== History ==
Mulazzo is recorded among the castles held by the Malaspina in the arbitration award pronounced at Sarzana in 1202 between Gualfredo, bishop of Luni, and the marquesses Corrado, Guglielmo and Alberto. When the family divided its lands at Parma on 28 August 1221, Mulazzo became the seat of the share that fell to Corrado and comprised the territory on the right bank of the Magra; his branch kept the arms of the Spino Secco ("dry thorn"), while the line of his cousin Opizzino, centred on Filattiera, took those of the Spino Fiorito. A cadet line of Mulazzo descended from Corrado's son Moruello in the division of April 1266; Moruello and his successors took part in the Malaspina expansion into Sardinia, where he died in March 1285.

Mulazzo remained the capital of a small imperial fief until 2 July 1797, when the French general Chabot proclaimed the abolition of the surviving imperial fiefs of the Lunigiana. Its last marquis, Azzo Giacinto Malaspina, was a brother of the navigator Alessandro Malaspina (1754–1810), who was born at Mulazzo and commanded the Spanish scientific expedition of 1789–1794. Under the Duchy of Modena and Reggio the comunità of Mulazzo, then within the jurisdiction of Tresana, counted 1,631 inhabitants in 1832 in six parishes, and the former fief of Castevoli was joined to it by a decree of 23 May 1849.
