= Villafranca in Lunigiana =

- Comune
- Comune di Villafranca in Lunigiana
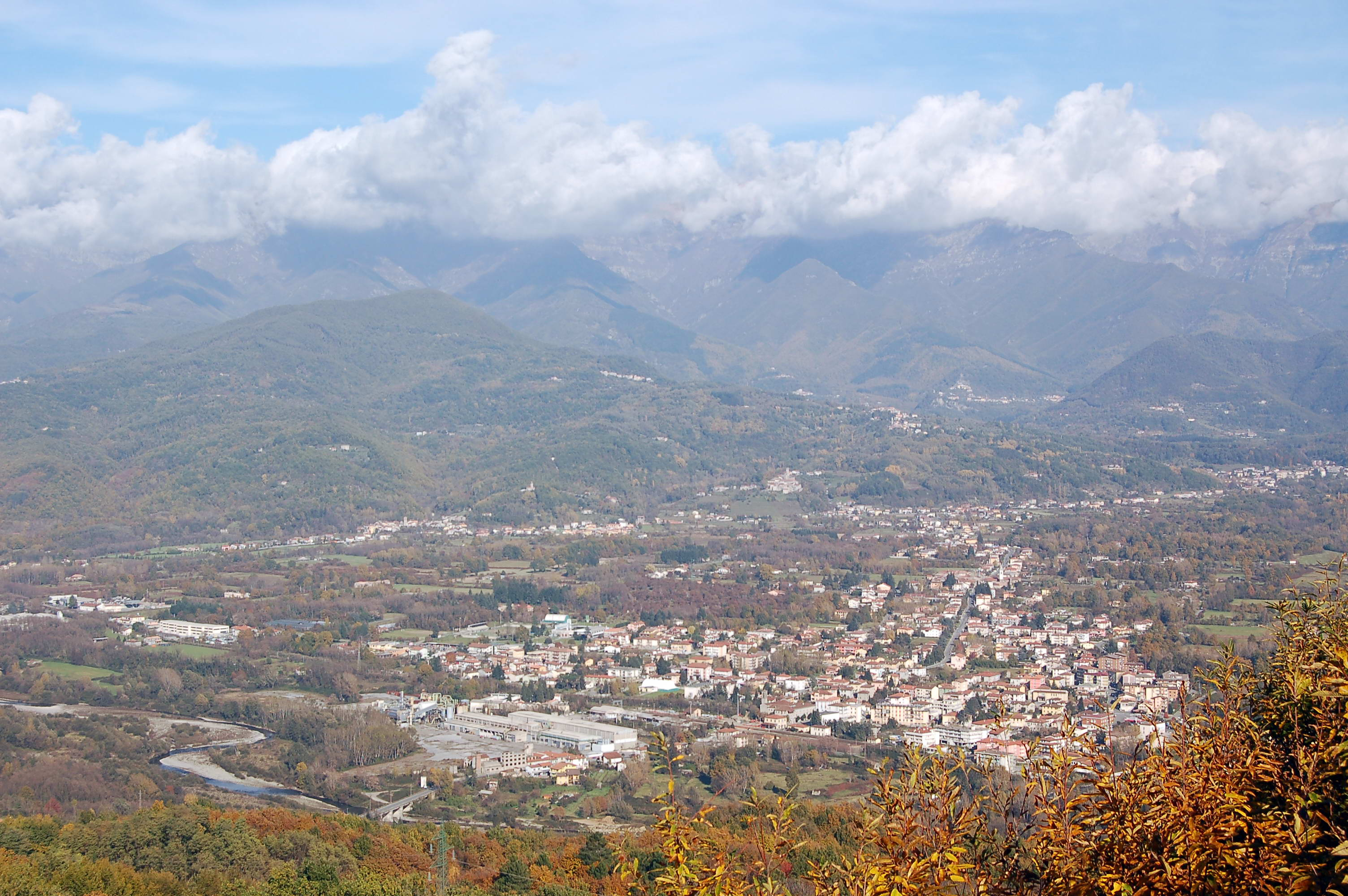

- Coat of arms

- Location within Italy Location within Tuscany
- Coordinates: 44°17′N 9°57′E
- Country: Italy
- Region: Tuscany
- Province: Massa and Carrara (MS)
- Frazioni: Filetto, Fornoli, Irola, Malgrate Lunigiana, Merizzo, Mocrone, Virgoletta

Government
  - Mayor: Filippo Bellesi

Area
  - Total: 29.5 km^{2} (11.4 sq mi)
- Elevation: 138 m (453 ft)

Population (31 August 2015)
  - Total: 4,777
  - Density: 162/km^{2} (419/sq mi)
- Demonym: Villafranchesi
- Time zone: UTC+1 (CET)
  - Summer (DST): UTC+2 (CEST)
- Postal code: 54028
- Dialing code: 0187
- Patron saint: St. John the Baptist
- Saint day: 24 June
- Website: Official website

Villafranca in Lunigiana is a comune (municipality) in the Province of Massa and Carrara in the Italian region Tuscany, located about 120 kilometres (75 miles) northwest of Florence and about 35 km (22 mi) northwest of Massa.

It is located on the Via Francigena, and has maintained part of the medieval historical center. In the frazione of Mocrone is the small church of San Maurizio, from the 13th–14th centuries.

== History ==
The branch of the Malaspina named after Villafranca originated in the division of the family lands agreed at Mulazzo on 20–21 April 1266, when the three sons of Federico di Corrado — Corrado the Younger, Opizzino and Tommaso — became its founders. Corrado is the Currado whom Dante meets in the eighth canto of the Purgatorio. Through his marriage to Urica, a natural daughter of the judge of Torres, the branch obtained Bosa and the castle of Osilo in Sardinia; the marquesses of Villafranca held this Sardinian lordship, with the curatorie of Montes, Figulinas and Coros, until 1343, when Giovanni di Villafranca surrendered it to Peter IV of Aragon.

After the death of the marquess Giovan-Spinetta in 1469 the fief was governed for some twenty years by his widow Teodorina, guardian of their minor sons, who defended its claims against Florence in close contact with the Sforza of Milan. In 1500 her sons divided the state, Tommaso receiving Villafranca, Virgoletta, Castevoli, Brugnato, Rocchetta, Stadomelli and other places. The Observant Friars Minor were called to Villafranca in 1511 by Bianca di Collalto, and in 1525 her son, the marquess Bartolommeo, built the church and convent of San Francesco for them.

The surviving imperial fiefs of the Lunigiana were abolished in 1797. In 1832 the united communities of Villafranca and Filetto, comprising eleven parishes, had 3,212 inhabitants; Emanuele Repetti also records the town on the Via Romea or Pontremolese road, and identifies it with the Villa Leale of the medieval itineraries. The present comune was established in 1894.
