= Franceschino Malaspina =

Italian nobleman

Franceschino Malaspina was the lord of Castiglione del Terziere and son of Moroello Malaspina, a black Guelf captain. In 1306 he gave Dante refuge there. Franceschino then sent Dante as an ambassador to Sarzana.

== Sources ==
- The Nation, 1891, article on Dante
- Britannica, 15th Edition (1982), Vol. VII, p. 525.
