= Davide Danti =

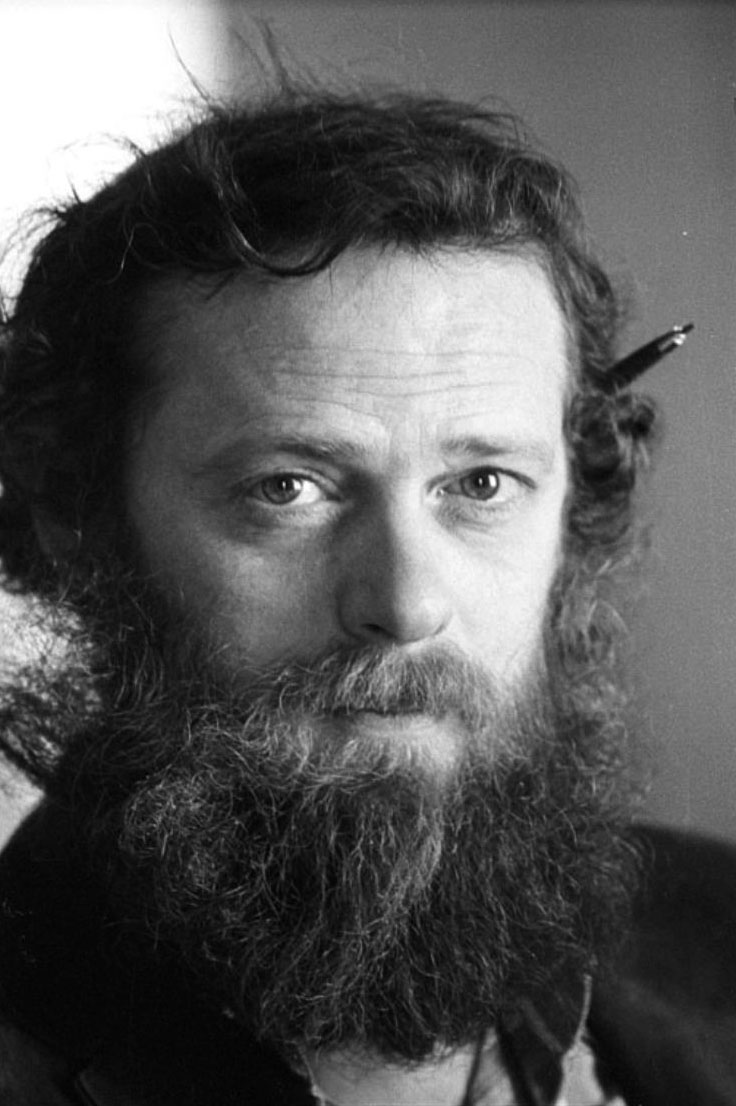
- Davide Danti in the 80's
- Born: Davide Adolfo Dante Danti; 27 February 1938; Milan, Italy
- Died: 4 August 2011 (aged 73); Pisa, Italy
- Resting place: Offiano's parish
- Known for: Painting, Drawing, Printmaking
- Notable work: "I Fatti di Milano 1898" (1977) "L'offerta del pane alla corte di Bisanzio" "Florence Nightingale"

Davide Danti (Milan, 27 February 1938 – Pisa, 4 August 2011) was an Italian illustrator/artist/translator. His major works include "Il Murale Grande" in Milan Town Hall, and "Florence Nightingale", a large outdoor mural on the wall of the Croce Bianco of Codiponte, Lunigiana. There are many other examples of his work in Lunigiana, where he maintained a studio and was frequently employed by the local Commune to decorate and beautify buildings. He regularly illustrated magazines and publications such as "Solidarieta Come" (see No 255, 1 August 2006) and was an accomplished translator in the English, French, Spanish and Portuguese languages.
