= Filattiera =

- Comune
- Comune di Filattiera
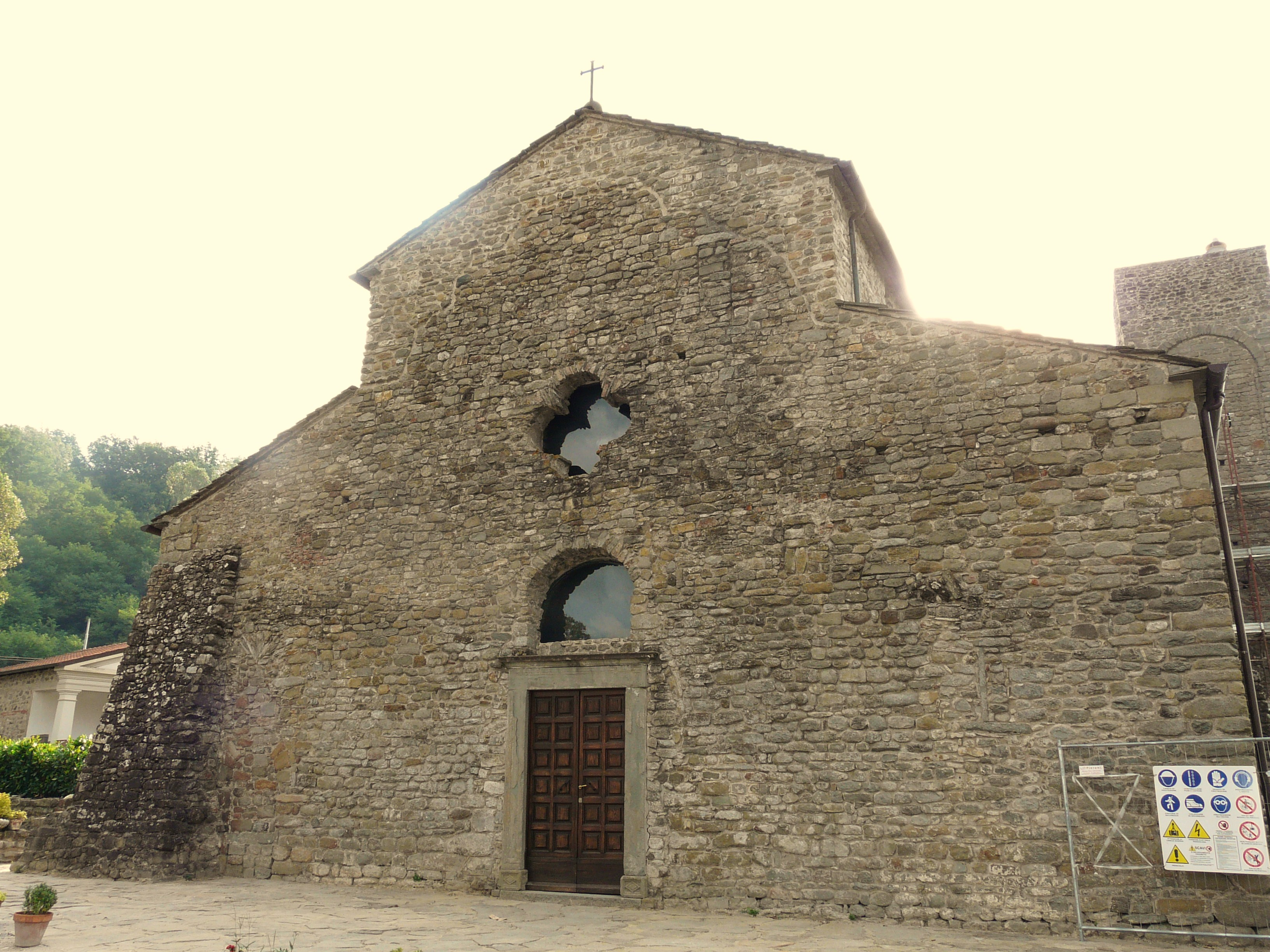
- Pieve of St. Stephen

- Coat of arms

- Location within Italy Location within Tuscany
- Coordinates: 44°20′N 9°56′E
- Country: Italy
- Region: Tuscany
- Province: Massa and Carrara (MS)
- Frazioni: Caprio, Cavallana, Dobbiana, Gigliana, Lusignana, Migliarina, Ponticello, Rocca Sigillina, Scorcetoli (Stazione), Serravalle

Government
  - Mayor: Annalisa Folloni

Area
  - Total: 48.9 km^{2} (18.9 sq mi)
- Elevation: 213 m (699 ft)

Population (31 August 2017)
  - Total: 2,271
  - Density: 46.4/km^{2} (120/sq mi)
- Demonym: Filattieresi
- Time zone: UTC+1 (CET)
  - Summer (DST): UTC+2 (CEST)
- Postal code: 54023
- Dialing code: 0187
- Patron saint: St. Stephen
- Saint day: 26 December
- Website: Official website

Filattiera is a comune (municipality) in the Province of Massa and Carrara in the Italian region Tuscany, located about 120 kilometres (75 mi) northwest of Florence and about 35 kilometres (22 mi) northwest of Carrara.

== Main sights ==
- Church of San Giorgio (12th century). It contains a rare tombstone from 752 remembering the work of a Lombard bishop credited with sweeping off paganism in the area. The church has an aisle with apse (another aisle was destroyed in the 12th century), and a bell tower, also from the 12th century.
- Romanesque church of San Giovanni Battista, at Dobbiana. The façade is made of sandstone. The interior is in Baroque style.
- Medieval pieve of St. Stephen, at Sorano, known from 1148.
