= Lunigiana =

Historical territory of Italy

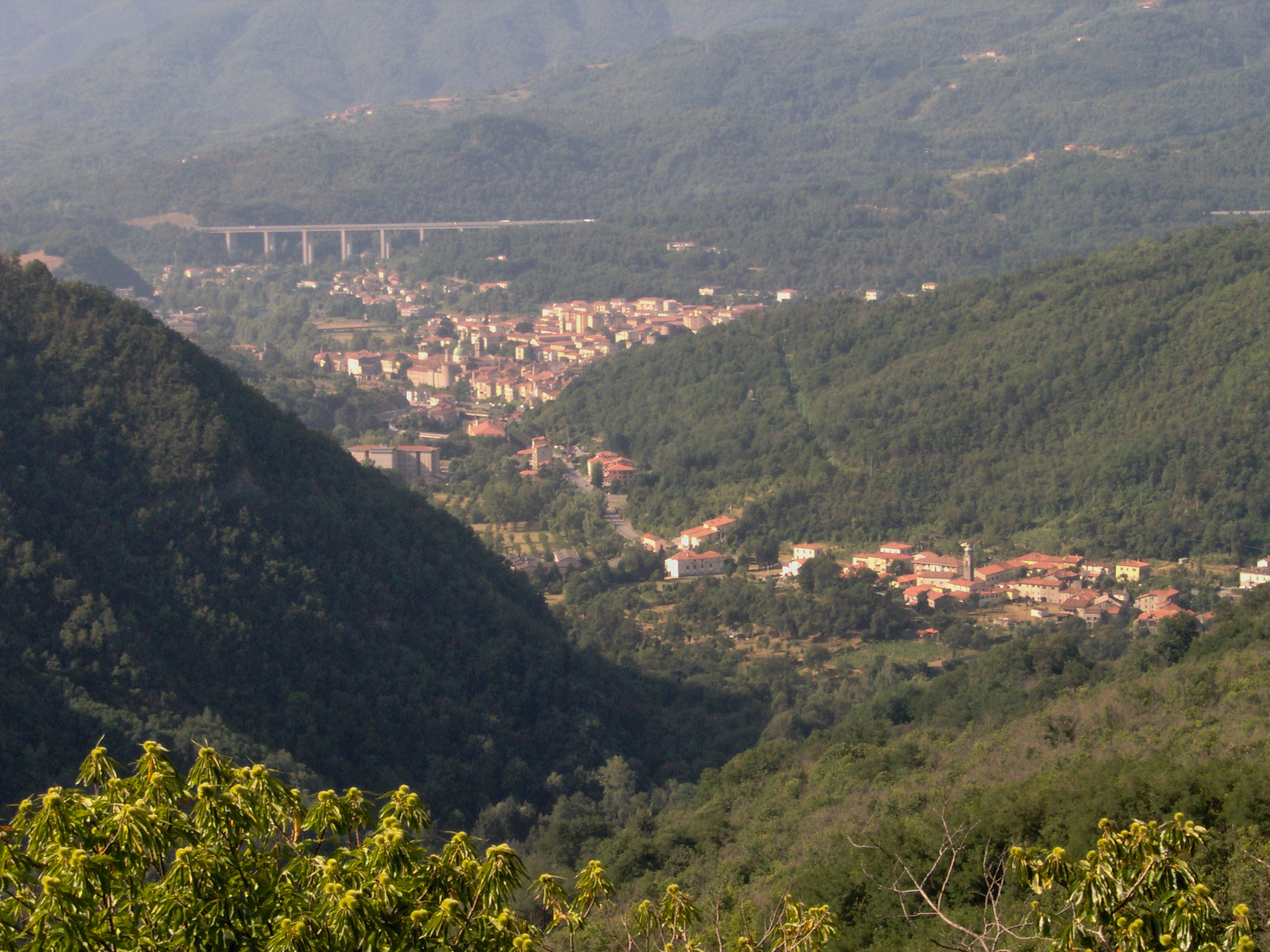
View of Lunigiana between Filattiera and Aulla.

Map of the municipalities that make up Lunigiana

The Lunigiana (pronounced [luniˈdʒaːna]) or Lunesana is a historical territory of Italy that today falls within the provinces of Massa Carrara, Tuscany, and La Spezia, Liguria. Its borders derive from the ancient Roman settlement, later the medieval diocese of Luni, which no longer exists.

Lunigiana, a mountainous region dissected by the Magra river, covers an area that runs from the Apennines to the Mediterranean Sea, now belongs in part to Tuscany and in part to Liguria. It takes its name from Luni, a Roman town, perhaps pre-dated by an Etruscan settlement, which became the principal urban center on the northern Tuscan coast. Some contend that the name Luni refers to the Moon, a celestial body whose beauty is made all the more attractive when framed by the white-peaked Apuan Alps and high Apennine Mountains. Others maintain, though little or no evidence exists, that the region was populated by those who worshiped the Moon. As if to unite history and myth, the symbol of contemporary Lunigiana is a crescent moon held in the claw of a bear.

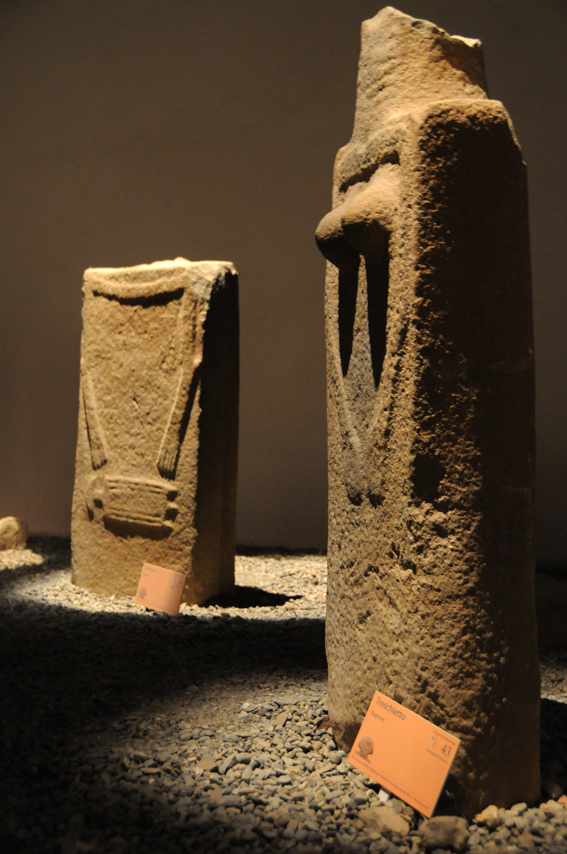
Female stele statue “Treschietto” (Pontremoli - Museo delle Statue Stele Lunigianesi)

The earliest recorded inhabitants of this region may have been the Apuani (from which the name of the Apuan mountain chain is derived), an ancient Ligurian people, as well as Etruscans who may have inhabited towns along the coast and even the hamlets near in-land trade routes. While evidence of both Roman and later Medieval settlements are ample, the wondrously appealing stele, late pre-historic and Bronze Age stone statues that have been found in large numbers in this part of Tuscany, remain the symbol of this ancient land. These stelae depict human figures, often with stylized facial features, weapons, and ornaments. They are believed to have served as funerary or commemorative monuments for local elites, though their exact function and meaning remain subjects of scholarly debate. Found throughout the Magra Valley and surrounding areas, stelae are the first expression of the art and, perhaps, of the religious beliefs of the peoples that inhabited northern Tuscany from the Bronze Age to start of the Roman Empire.

== Castles ==
During the Middle Ages, there were 160 castles in Lunigiana, only thirty of which have reached our times in a good state of preservation; others, such as the castle of Agnino di Fivizzano, have fallen into ruin. It was in these castles that Dante found respite during his stay in Lunigiana. The historical origins of these castles date back to times when the Lombards dominated most of the Pianura Padana and, seeking an outlet on the Ligurian/Tuscan coast, they found in the Cisa Pass and the Cerreto Pass, near the town of Fivizzano, the easiest ways to cross the Apennines.

During ancient times, when the settlement of Luni, founded by the Romans in 177 BC, (today a site of significant Roman ruins and a modern museum) was a flourishing city and harbour, the Romans had already built solid defensive posts along the Via Aurelia, a major road that linked up central Italy to Lunigiana and from Lunigiana to both the coastal road through Liguria and to Gaul (modern France) and across the Apennines into what is now the province of Reggio Emilia. Upon significant sections of this Roman road, the Lombards would later build the Via Francigena, for the control of which there were bloody and ferocious struggles among the local nobility, concerned with the maintenance of their dominion and fiefdoms, as well as between the states of Pisa and Lucca and, later still, between Florence, Milan and Genoa.

The most important castles in Lunigiana, including La Verrucola, the famous castle of Fivizzano formerly inhabited by the late artist Pietro Cascella, and the castle of the Piagnaro in Pontremoli, the Rocca of Villafranca, the Malaspina castle in the city of Massa and the fortified village of Filetto, had been built as a result of these monumental struggles for control of Lunigiana. Moreover, when the Malaspina (one of the leading Lunigianese dynasties during the Middle Ages) played an import part in both the local politics of Lunigiana and the politics of northern Italy, they built a great number of castles, which were used as residences and fortifications by which several branches of the dynasty defended the territory.

Some scholars contend that with the growth of flourishing branches of the Malaspina dynasty, the inheritance of Lunigianese feudal territories by the ever contesting large and small branches of the family eventually brought about a diminution of individual holdings causing, in the end, the parceling of fiefdoms into increasingly smaller estates, all of which needed to be protected through the building of castles and other stone fortifications. Thus, through the centuries, many large and small (now picturesque) castles were built in Lunigiana, but at the cost of weakening the overall power of the family at each generation.

As a region that controls the passage from Tuscany to the northern territories of Lombardy and Parma, as well as from Tuscany to the eastern lands of Liguria and across the Apennines into Reggio Emilia, Lunigiana was fought over for centuries in countless wars that pitted the native feudal dynasties against one another. Then, in order to gain control of this strategic region, Luccans fought Pisans, Pisa struggled with Genoese, Milanese struck out against the Modense and Florentines made war on them all. While the Genoese were able to gain control of La Spezia, Lerici, Sarzana and much of the littoral coast all the way from the Cinque Terre to ancient Luni itself, the Milanese took more northern parts of Lunigiana. Meanwhile, some northeastern Lunigianese towns came under the control of either Parma or Modena. Nevertheless, the most strategic parts of ancient Lunigiana began to come under the control of the Florentine state in the early 15th century. By the second half of that century, Tuscan possession of most of Lunigiana was secured with the incorporation of Fivizzano and its vast territory into the Tuscan state. With Italian unification in the mid-nineteenth century, most of Lunigiana, though divided for centuries among the contesting duchies and city-states of northern Italy, came into the new Kingdom of Italy as part of Tuscany proper.

== Bibliography ==
- Caterina Rapetti, Accanto al camino. Diavoli stolti e contadini astuti nelle favole della Lunigiana, illustrations of Davide Danti, Milano, Edizioni dell'Arco 2007, ISBN 88-7876-096-X.
- De Marinis, R.C. (1994). "Le statue stele lunigianesi nel quadro dell’età del rame e del bronzo dell’Italia Settentrionale", in Atti del Museo Civico di Storia Naturale di Milano, vol. 135, pp. 111–140.
