= Lake Osiglia =

Artificial lake in Liguria, Italy

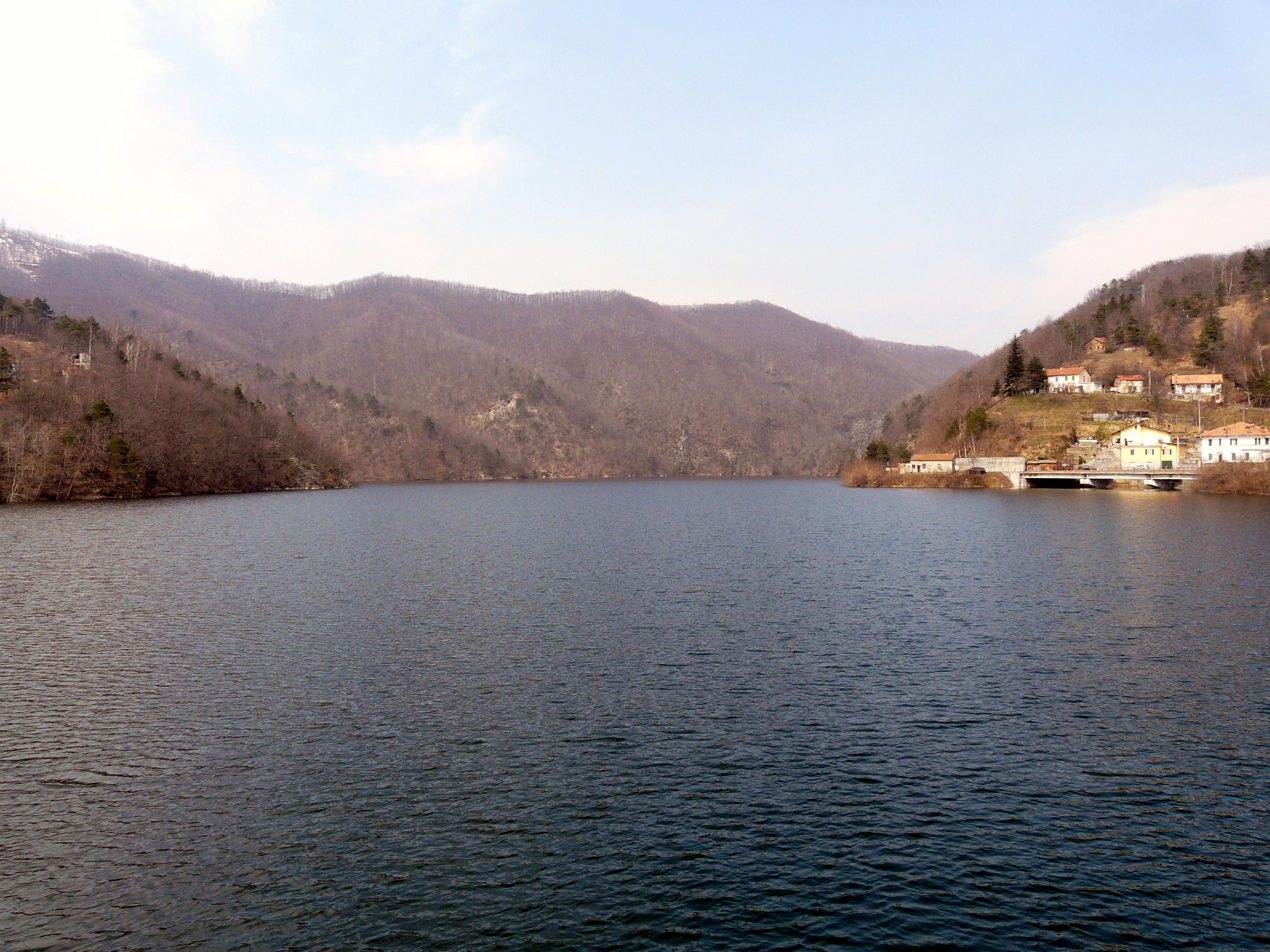
- Interactive map of Lake Osiglia
- Location: Osiglia, Province of Savona, Liguria, Italy
- Coordinates: 44°23′24″N 8°12′36″E
- Type: Artificial
- Primary inflows: Osiglietta, Rio Bertolotti
- Primary outflows: Osiglietta
- Max. length: 3 km (1.9 mi)
- Max. width: 0.2 km (0.12 mi)
- Water volume: 0.013 km^{3} (0.0031 cu mi)

The Lake Osiglia (o laj d’Oseria in the local dialect) is an artificial reservoir located in the municipality of Osiglia (SV) in Val Bormida.

== Geography ==
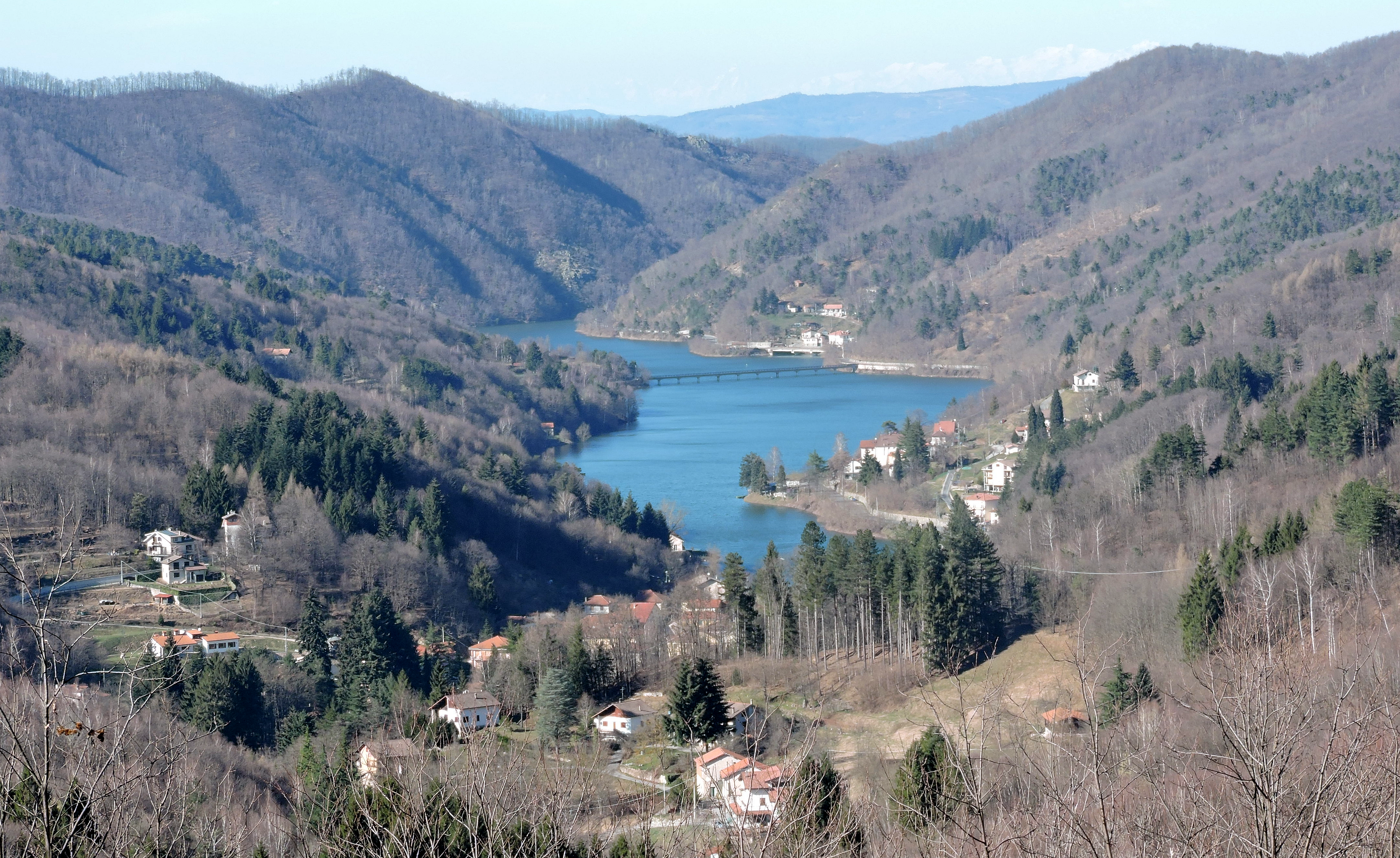
Overall view

With 3 km of length and a capacity of 13 million cubic meters of water, that of Osiglia is the largest lake in the Province of Savona. A road runs along its right side, and about halfway along its length, it is crossed by the Manfrin bridge, named after its designer, which allows connection to a small inhabited hamlet. It is a protected area of provincial interest and is safeguarded by the SIC designated Lake Osiglia protected area (code IT1323115).

== History ==
In 1926, the "Progetto di sistemazione del bacino montano" was conceived, designed by Eng. Quaglia, which involved the entire area in the construction of a series of dams and a hydroelectric plant in the municipality of Murialdo. However, studies on the rocky substrates that showed the unsuitability of the terrain and the events related to the start of World War II caused the discontinuation of all other works.

The dam of Osiglia, built between 1937 and 1939, was the only one completed, with a front of 224 m and a barrier height of 70.7 m. The reservoir was created to regulate the water flow to the Falck steel and ironworks located on the Bormida downstream of the dam, as well as to provide a constant water supply during the summer low flow.

The company that built the plant was Torno e C. of Milan, in partnership with Consonda-ICOS for rock studies and related consolidations. Following the dam’s construction, about three hundred people were displaced, and the three hamlets of Cavallotti, Giacchini, and Bertolotti, with several homes, shops, and a church, were submerged.

These ruins resurface only every ten or fifteen years, when, for maintenance reasons, the lake is completely drained, becoming a tourist attraction. The most recent drainings occurred in 2006 and December 2020.

== Dam specifications ==
- Type: Double-curvature arch dam
- Start of construction: 1937
- End of construction: 1939
- Crest elevation: 640.20 m above sea level
- Maximum reservoir elevation: 637 m above sea level
- Height above foundation: 76.8 m
- Crest length: 224 m
- Concrete volume: 75,000 m³
- Reservoir capacity: 13 million m³

== Structure ==
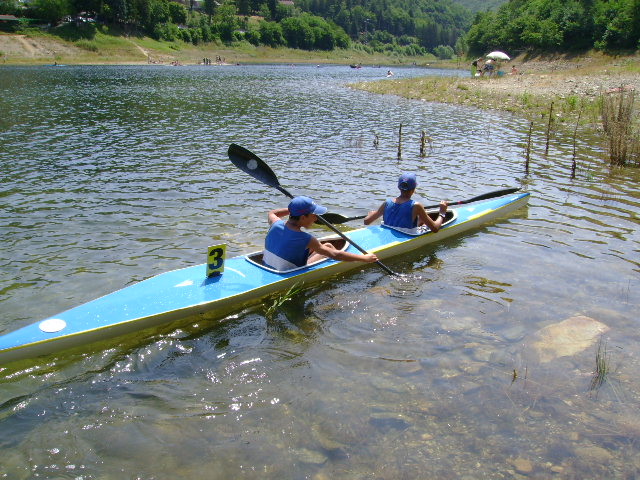
Kayak for two on the lake

The dam is shaped as a double-curvature arch with symmetry about the centerline axis. It is fully spillable. It is made of concrete with a pulvino at the base and reinforcement with a double mesh on two faces. The downstream face is covered with concrete, while the upstream face is covered with gunite. A reinforced concrete beam covers the radial and perimeter joints. A metal sheet embedded in the concrete ensures the sealing of joint injections due to concrete shrinkage.

There are two surface spillways and two deep ones, one of which is for complete draining, and a mid-depth spillway originally intended as the derivation channel for a tunnel to produce electricity. The design capacity is 682 m³/s.

== Electrical productivity ==
The Osiglia dam was also designed for electricity production, with a nominal plant capacity of 7 MW. The initial project included a hydroelectric plant in nearby Murialdo with a 12-km channel, but it remained only on paper. The water consistently feeds the stream, which is then utilized downstream with an intake at Millesimo (at 431 m) before being fed into the turbine of the Cairo Montenotte plant (at 326 m).

It is now owned by Tirreno Power, which until 2011 did not use the plant for electricity production. After insistence from local mayors, in 2012, a turbine was installed for a production of 701 kW and an expected annual output of 2 GWh, producing only 10% of the 7 MW it could achieve.

== Usage ==
The lake, located in a rugged valley of great naturalistic interest, surrounded by forests of beech, conifers, chestnut, and sessile oak, is a popular tourist destination. For water sports such as rowing, it hosts regional rowing competitions and interregional canoe races, in addition to a costumed regatta with homemade vessels and the Trofeo Internazionale Lago di Osiglia. For sport fishing of trout, provincial regulations apply.

== Image gallery ==
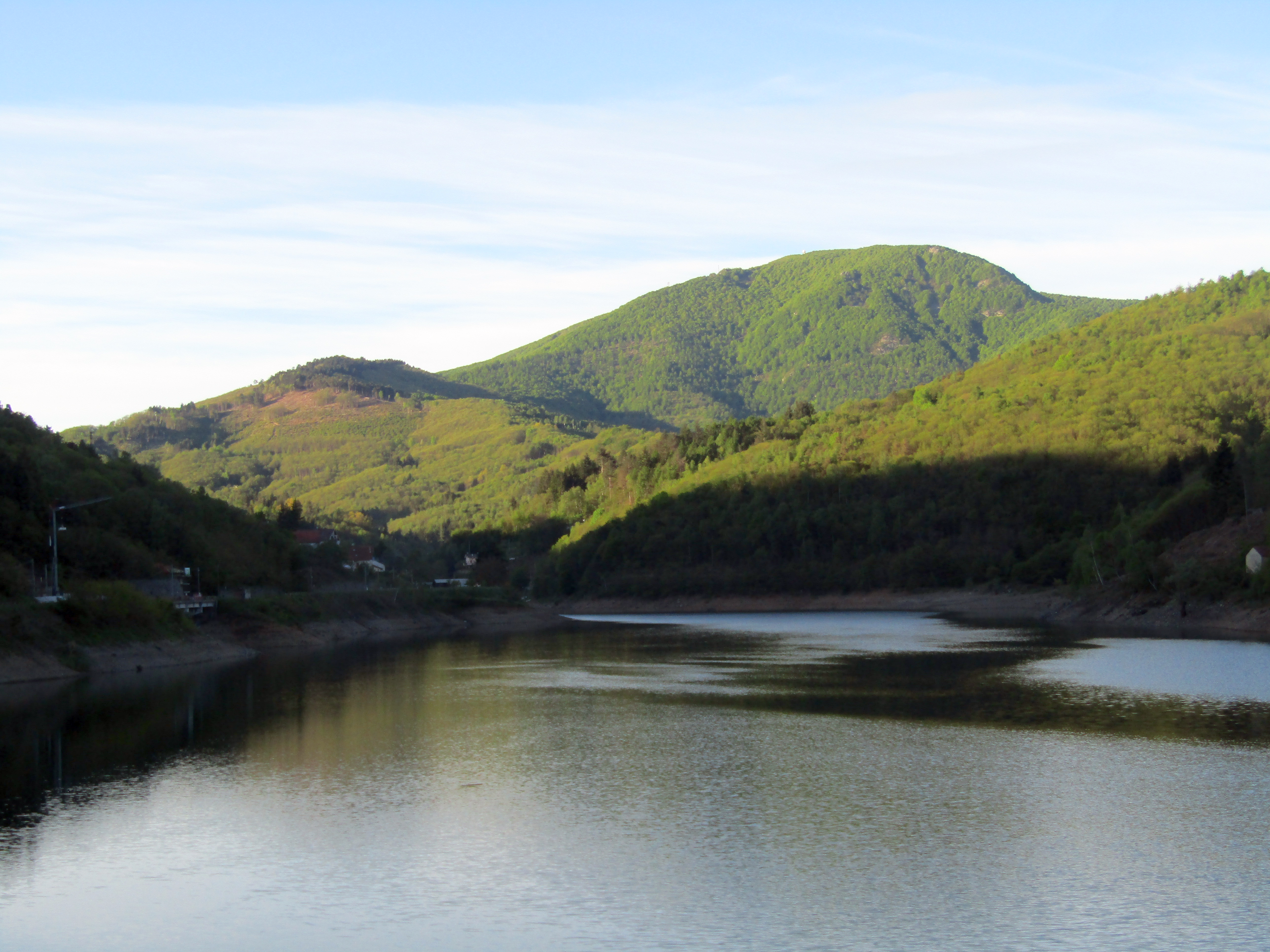
Monte Settepani (1,380 m) seen from Lake Osiglia

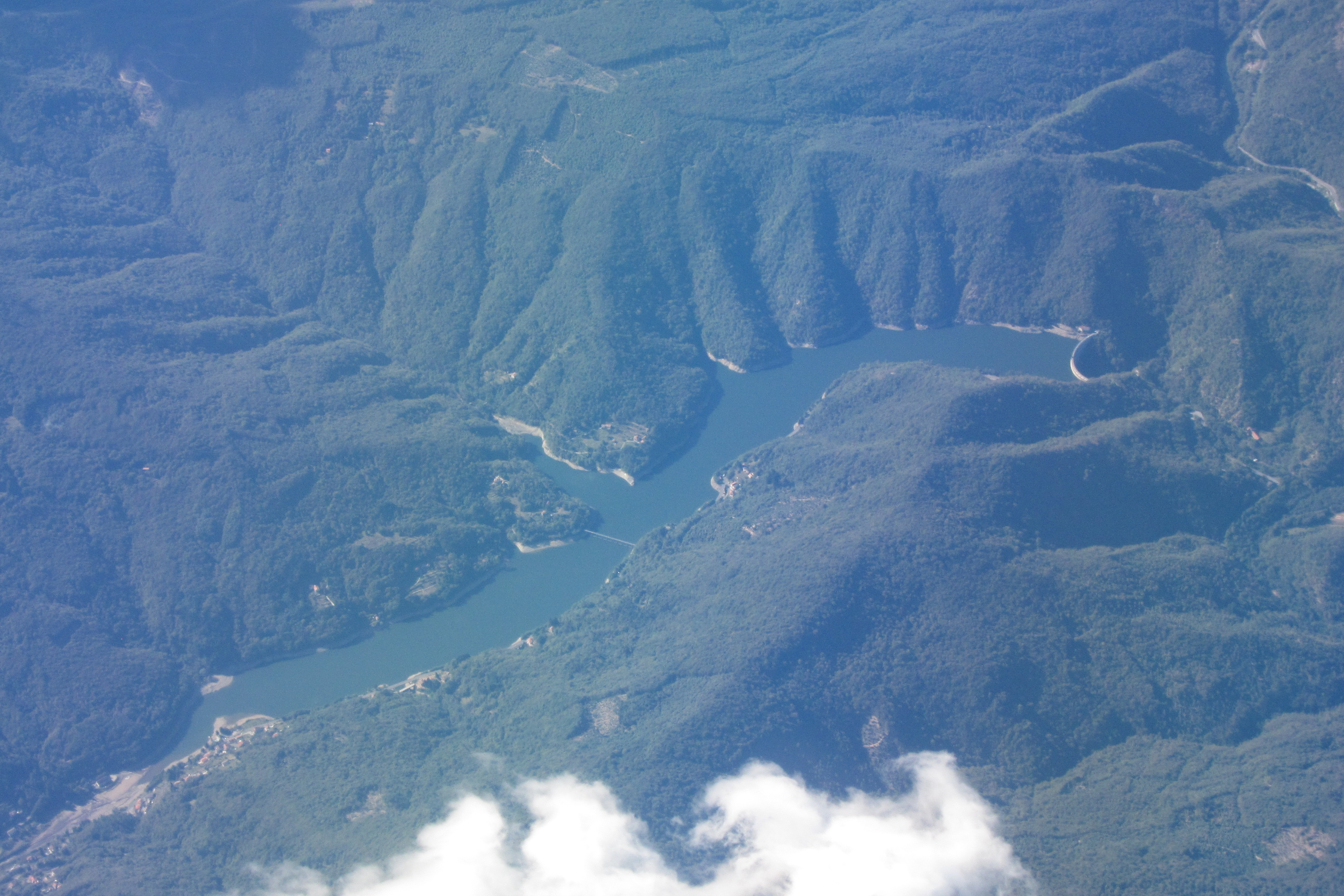
Aerial photo of Lake Osiglia

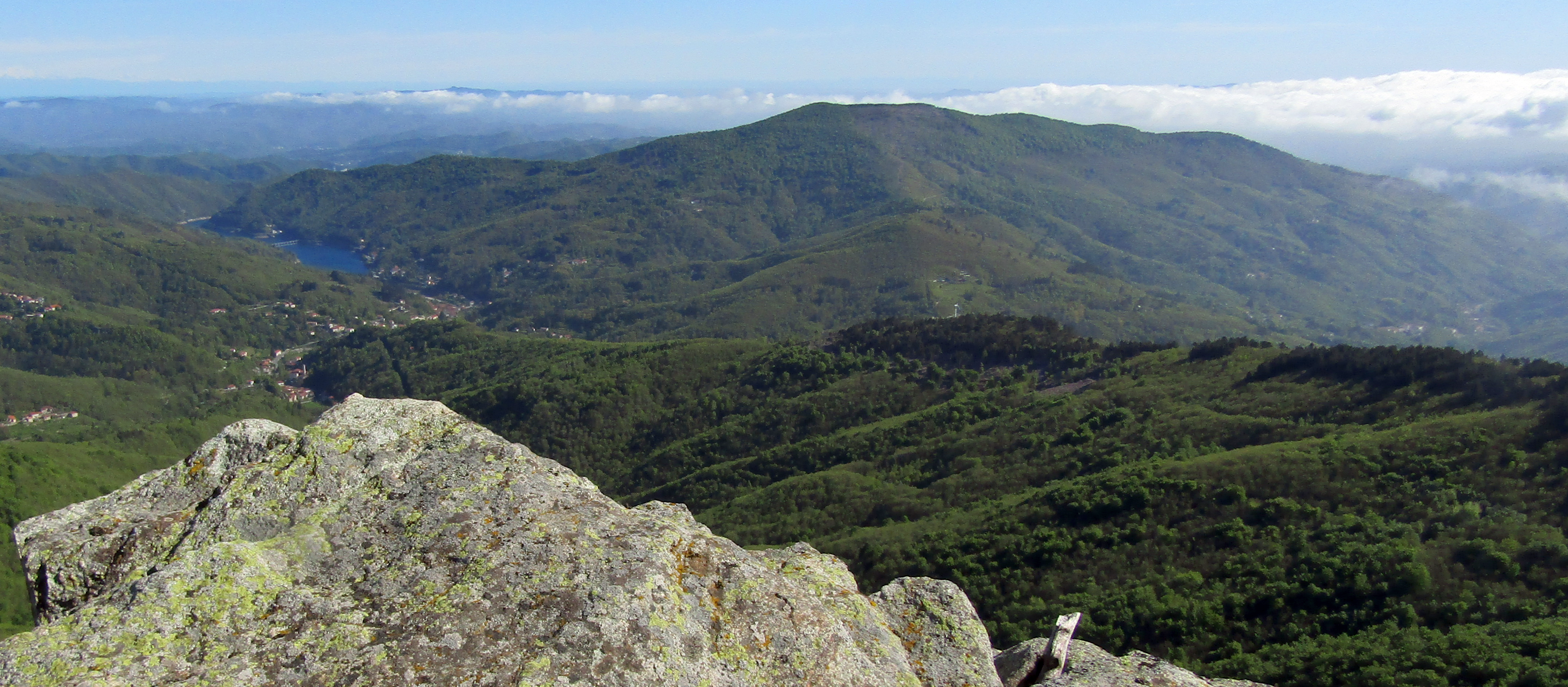
Ronco di Maglio and Lake Osiglia seen from the protruding rock (in the beech forest) called Rocca dei Falò (Ligurian Alps-1,250 m)

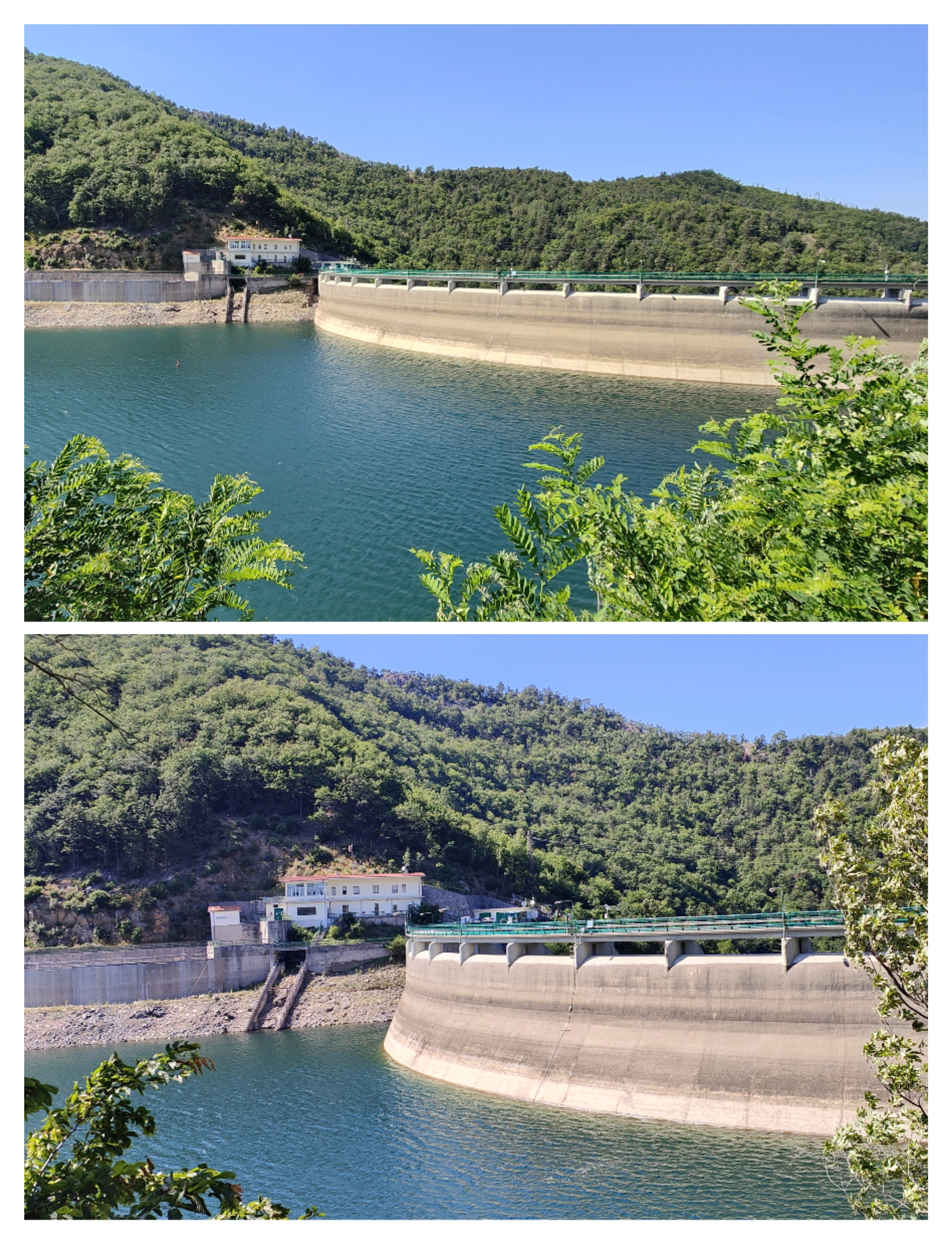
The Osiglia dam barrier (elevation 637 m)

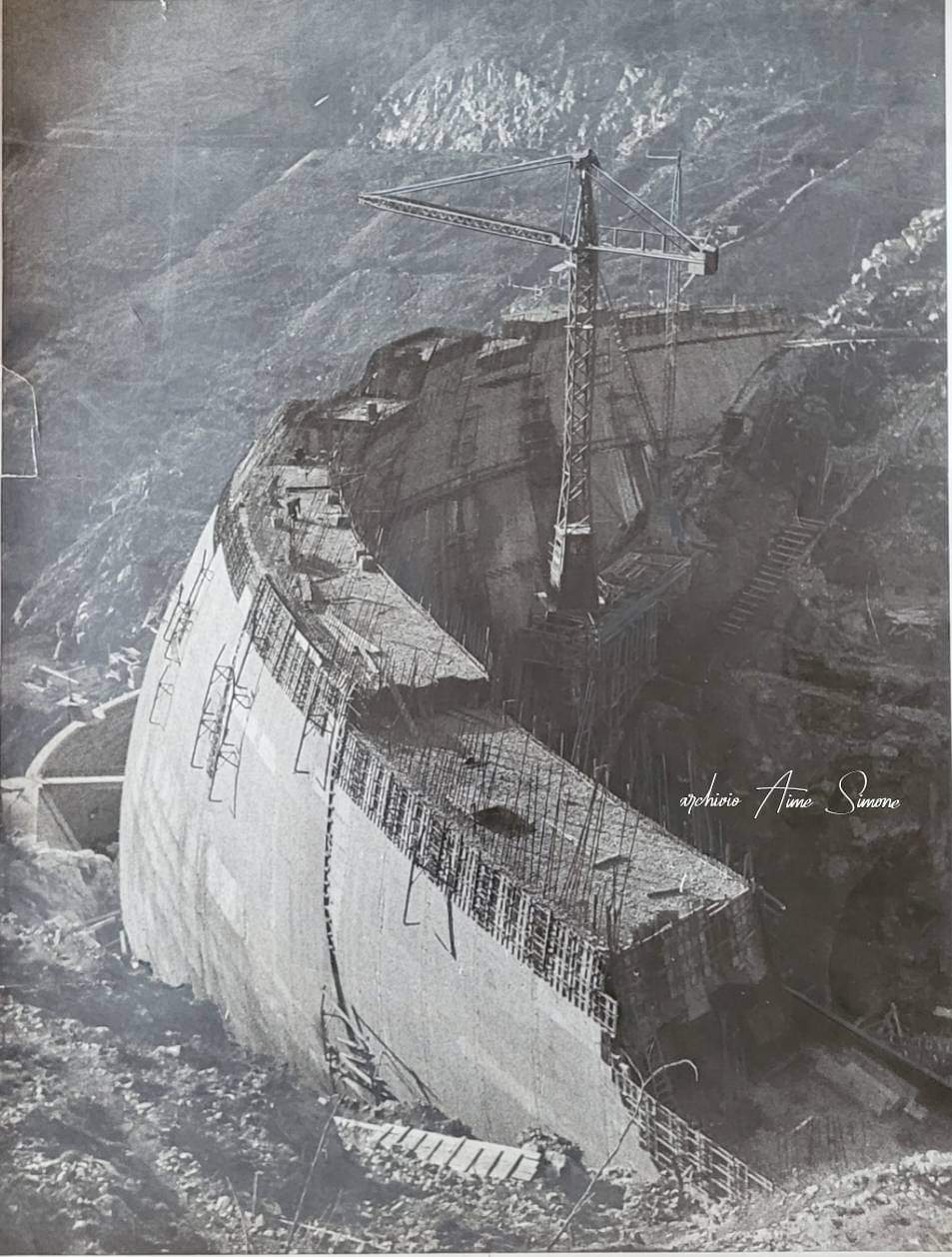
Progress of the Osiglia dam construction. 1938
