= Ronco di Maglio =

Mountain in Italy

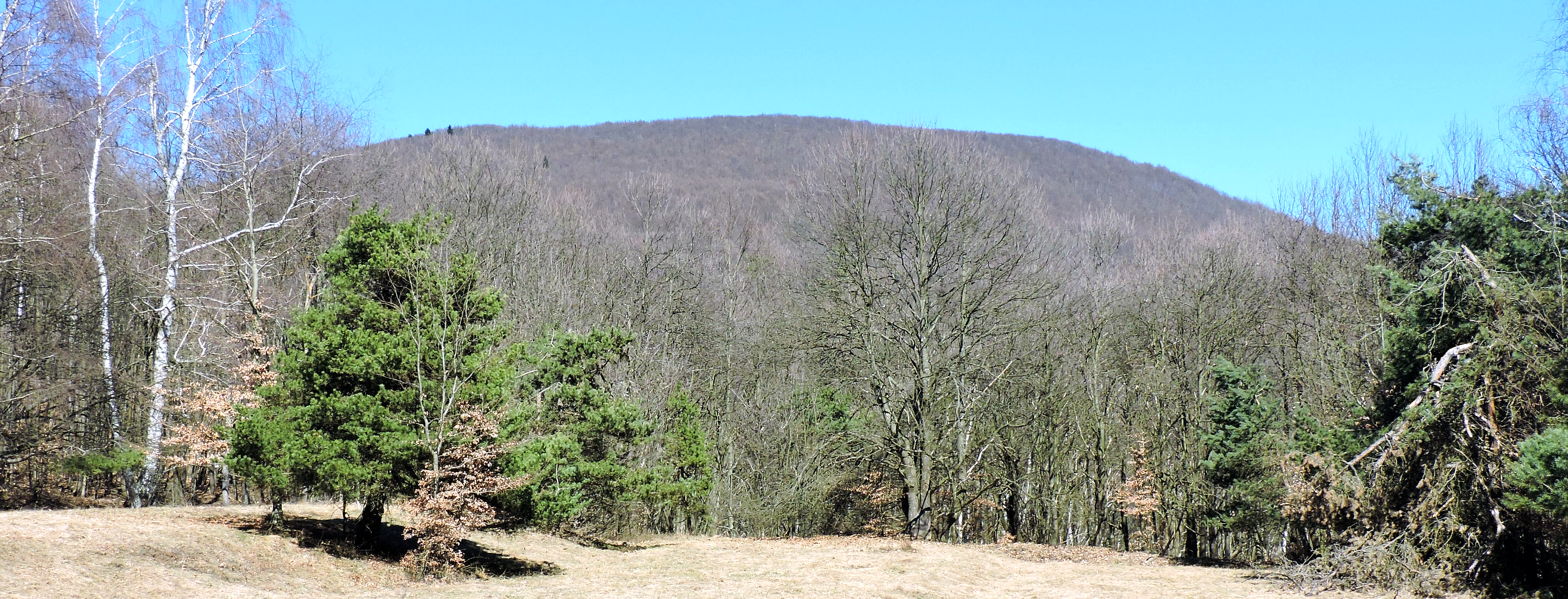
- The mountain as viewed from South

Highest point
- Elevation: 1,109.5 m (3,640 ft)
- Prominence: 315.5
- Isolation: 5.77 km (3.59 mi)
- Coordinates: 44.2947°N 8.22253°E

Geography
- Location within Alps
- Location: Liguria, Italy
- Parent range: Ligurian Alps

Ronco di Maglio is a mountain in Liguria, northern Italy, part of the Ligurian Prealps.

== Geography ==
The mountain is located near the centre of the Provincia di Savona, between the comuni (municipalities) of Osiglia and Bormida, and is one of the highest of the Ligurian Prealps. It stands on the ridge dividing two valleys belonging to the Bormida watershed, Osiglia valley (west) and Pallare valley. Going South a saddle at 858 metes divides it from Bric della Croce (911 m), while northwards the ridge lowers and ends up between Plodio and Millesimo. Near the summit can be seen a few pine trees remaining from a thick coniferous wood which used to grow in there.

== History ==
Around the mountain top some remains of Napoleonic trenches can be seen.

== Access to the summit ==
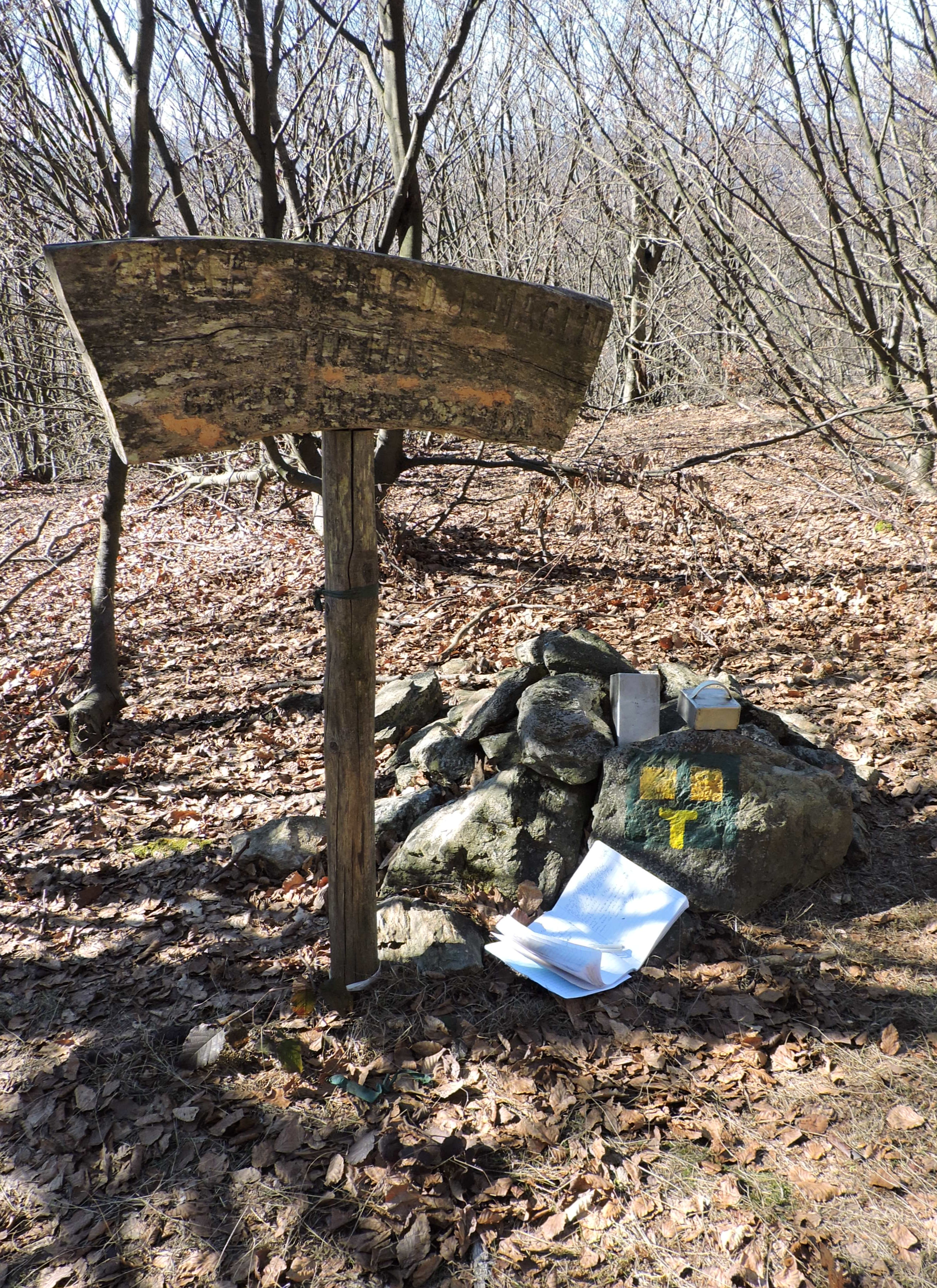
Summit cairn

Ronco di Maglio can be ascended by various waymarked foothpats; among them can be reminded the one starting from Colla Baltera (794 m) which, passing through Bric della Croce, reaches the summit from South. The mountain is also accessible by mountain bike. The mountain top is wooded and almost flat; on its highest point stands a cairn with a summit register.

== Nature conservation ==
The mountain and its surrounding area are part of a SIC (Site of Community Importance) called Ronco di Maglio (code: IT1322216).
