= Monte Camulera =

Mountain in Italy

- Bric Camulera
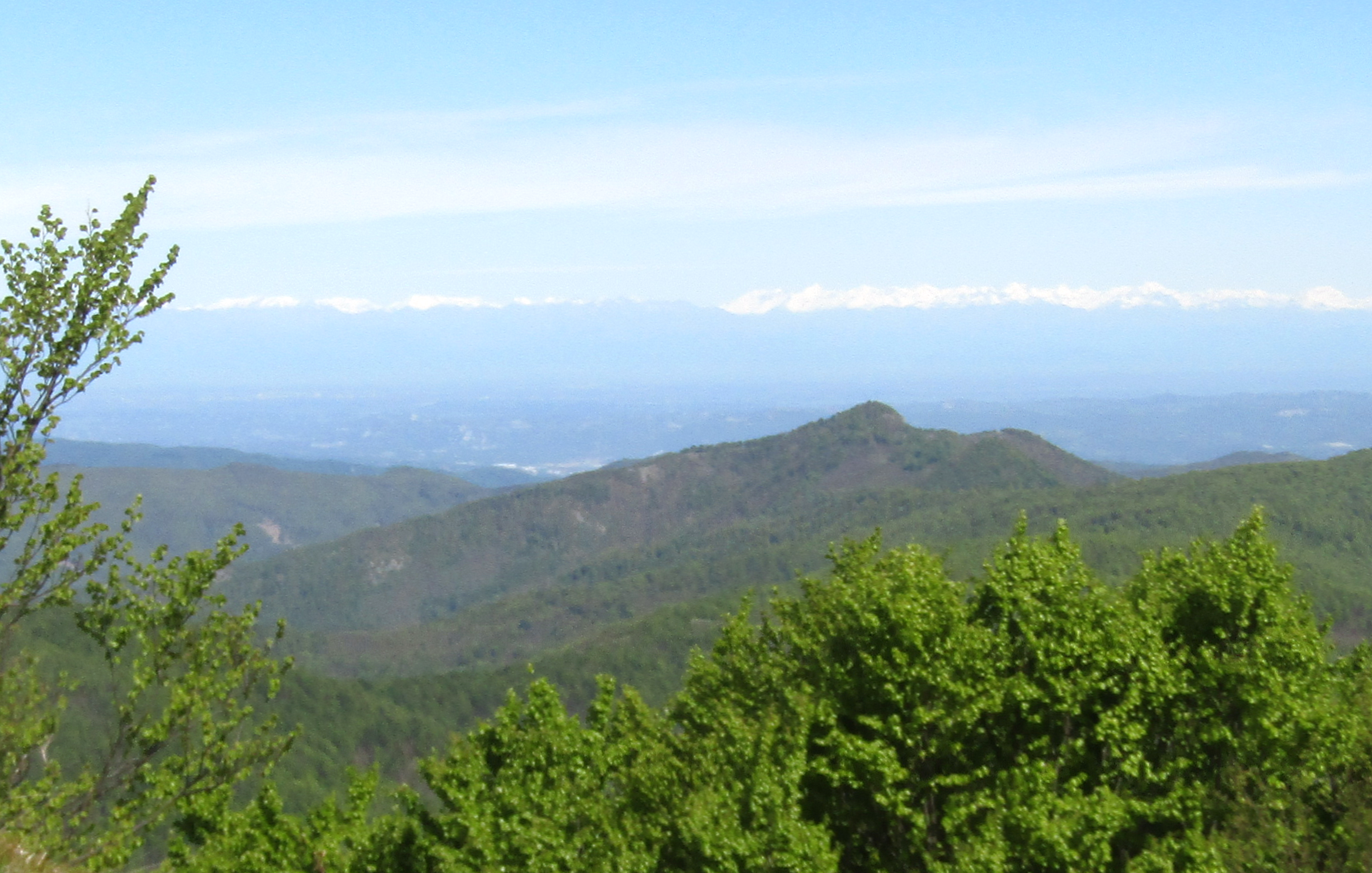
- Monte Camulera as seen from Monte Settepani

Highest point
- Elevation: 1,224 m (4,016 ft)
- Prominence: 135 m (443 ft)
- Coordinates: 44°17′26″N 8°08′54″E

Geography
- Location within Alps
- Location: Liguria, Italy
- Parent range: Ligurian Alps

Climbing
- First ascent: ancestral
- Easiest route: footpath from Riofreddo (Murialdo)

The Monte Camulera (or Bric Camulera, 1.224 m) is a mountain of the Ligurian Prealps, the eastern section of the Ligurian Alps.

== Features ==
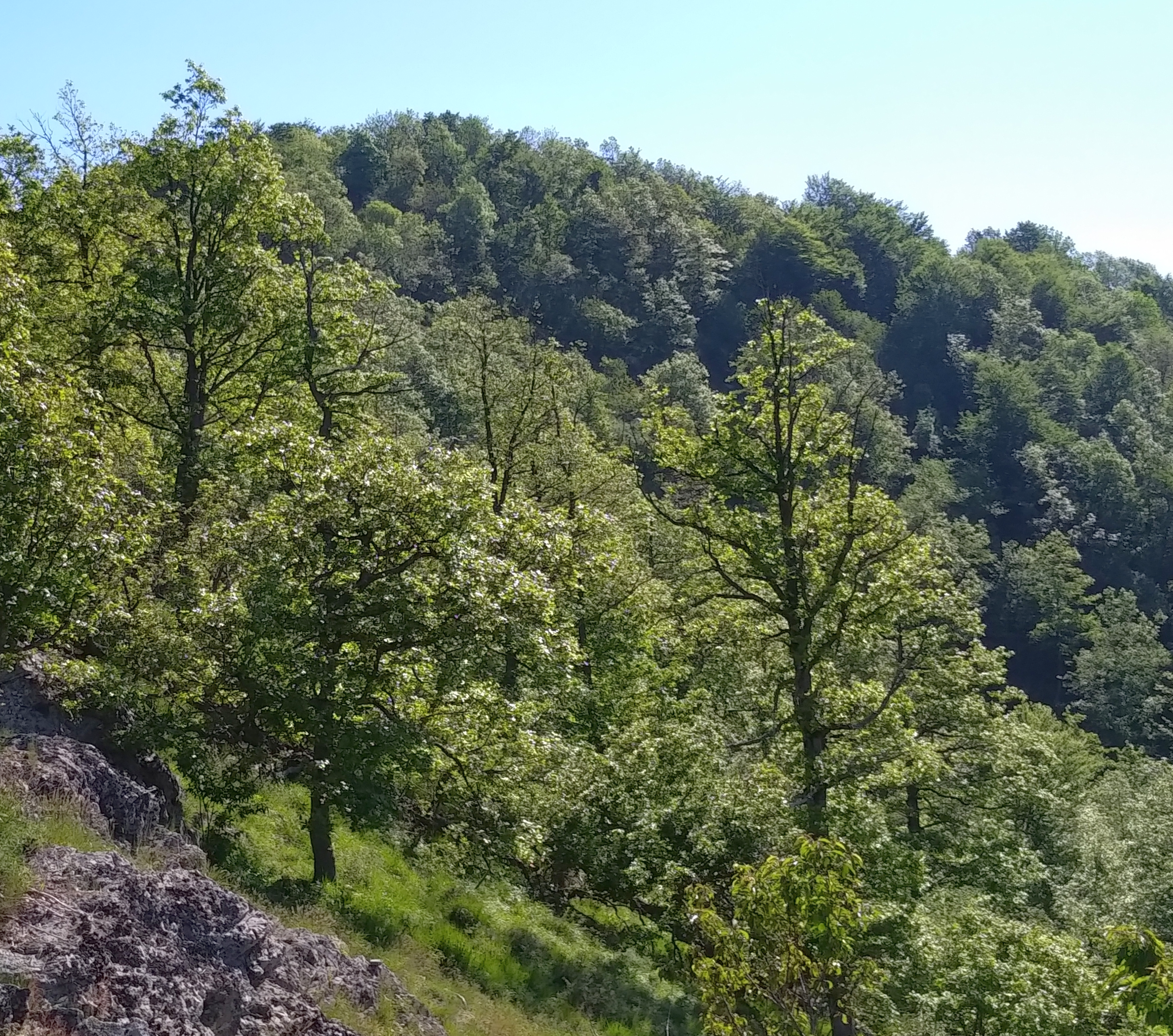
SW view

The mountain belongs to the comune of Murialdo and stands on the water divide between Bormida di Millesimo and Osiglietta valleys. The ridge branches from the main chain of the Alps close to Monte Settepani and, after Monte Camulera, ends at the confluence between Bormida and Osiglietta. The mountain slopes are shrouded by woods mainly of broad-leaved trees, but its topo is partially free of arboreal vegetation and offers an interesting panorama. Its topographic prominence is of 135 metres. The summit is marked by a summit cross with a summit register in a metal box fixed to its base.

=== SOIUSA classification ===
According to the SOIUSA (International Standardized Mountain Subdivision of the Alps) the mountain can be classified in the following way:

- main part = Western Alps; major sector = South Western Alps, section = Ligurian Alps, subsection = Prealpi Liguri
- supergroup = Catena Settepani-Carmo-Armetta, group = Gruppo del Monte Settepani, subgroup = Costiera del Monte Settepani, code = I/A-1.I-A.1.b

== Geology ==
A well known geological feature of Monte Camulera is porphyryc quartz lens wedged in a matrix of besimaudite, an igneous rock typical of the surrounding area. This rocky outcrop, roughly round-shaped, has been interpreted as the intersection of an ancient volcanic pipe with the present-day earth surface.

== History ==
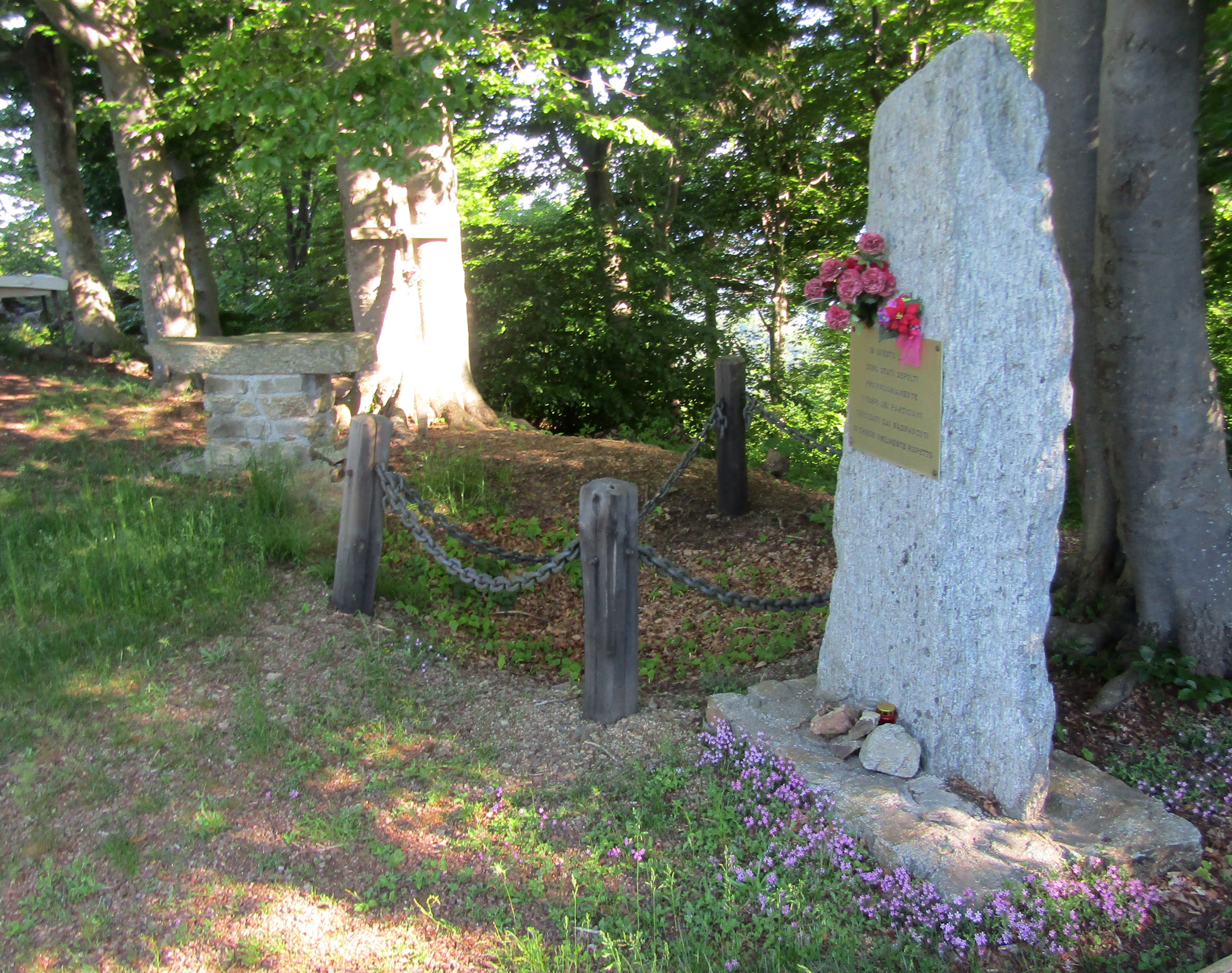
Memorial tablet to the fallen partisans

A stone plaque in memory of five fallen partisans is located not faraway from the summit of the mountain, on the slopes facing Bormida di Millesimo valley. In November 29 of 1944 Angelo Bevilacqua, Actis Grande Stelio, Giacomo Pesce, Vincenzo Girello, Roberto De Cicco e Marino Risaliti were captured by fascist troops of the Black Brigades. After being interrogated and tortured they were shot dead by a firing squad on the spot. Their corpses were retrieved by inhabitants of the area and are now buried in the Zinola graveyard (Savona). Veteran associations use to organize visits to the memorial and other initiatives to remember the fallen partisans.

== Access to the summit ==
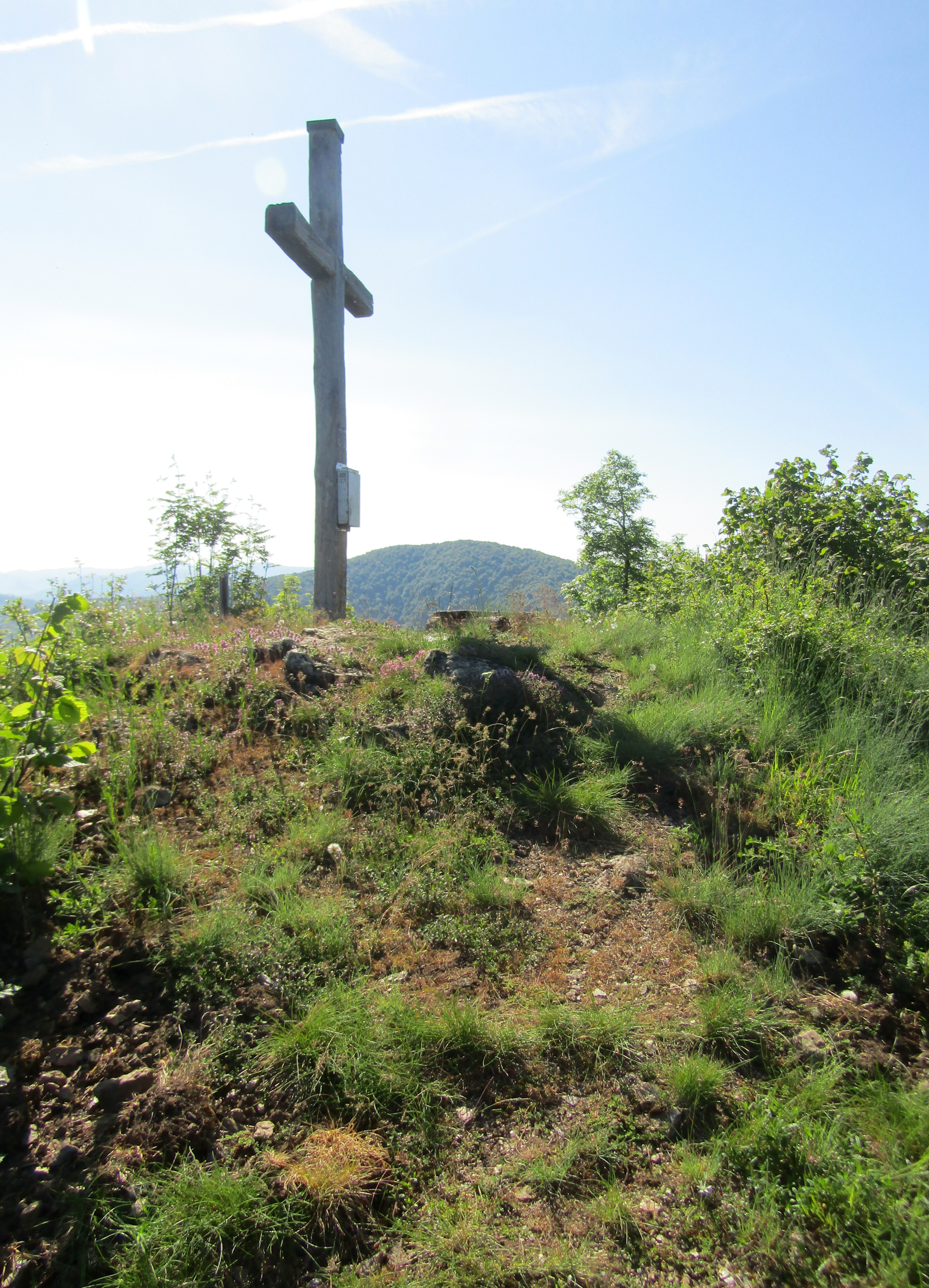
Summit cross

The summit of monte Camulera can be easily attained by footpath. Different ways star from some village in the municipality of Osiglia,. In one and a half hours' walk the mountain can also be reached from Riofreddo, a village in the municipality of Murialdo, or also, with a longer hike, from the centre of the municipality.

== Nature conservation ==
The mountain is included into the Area protetta Provinciale Monte Camulera, a nature protected area established by the Provincia di Savona, encompassing 490 ha.

== Bibliography ==
- Marazzi, Sergio (2005). Atlante Orografico delle Alpi. SOIUSA (in Italian). Pavone Canavese: Priuli & Verlucca editori. ISBN 9788880682738.
- Montagna, Euro; Montaldo, Lorenzo (1981). Alpi Liguri. Guida dei Monti d'Italia (in Italian). Milano: CAI / TCI.

== Maps ==
- Cartografia ufficiale italiana in scala 1:25.000 e 1:100.000 (Map). Istituto Geografico Militare.
- Comunità montana ingauna - il suo comprensorio - Cartografia regionale in scala 1:25.000 (Map). Albenga: Comunità montana ingauna. 1998.
