= Cosseria =

- Comune
- Comune di Cosseria
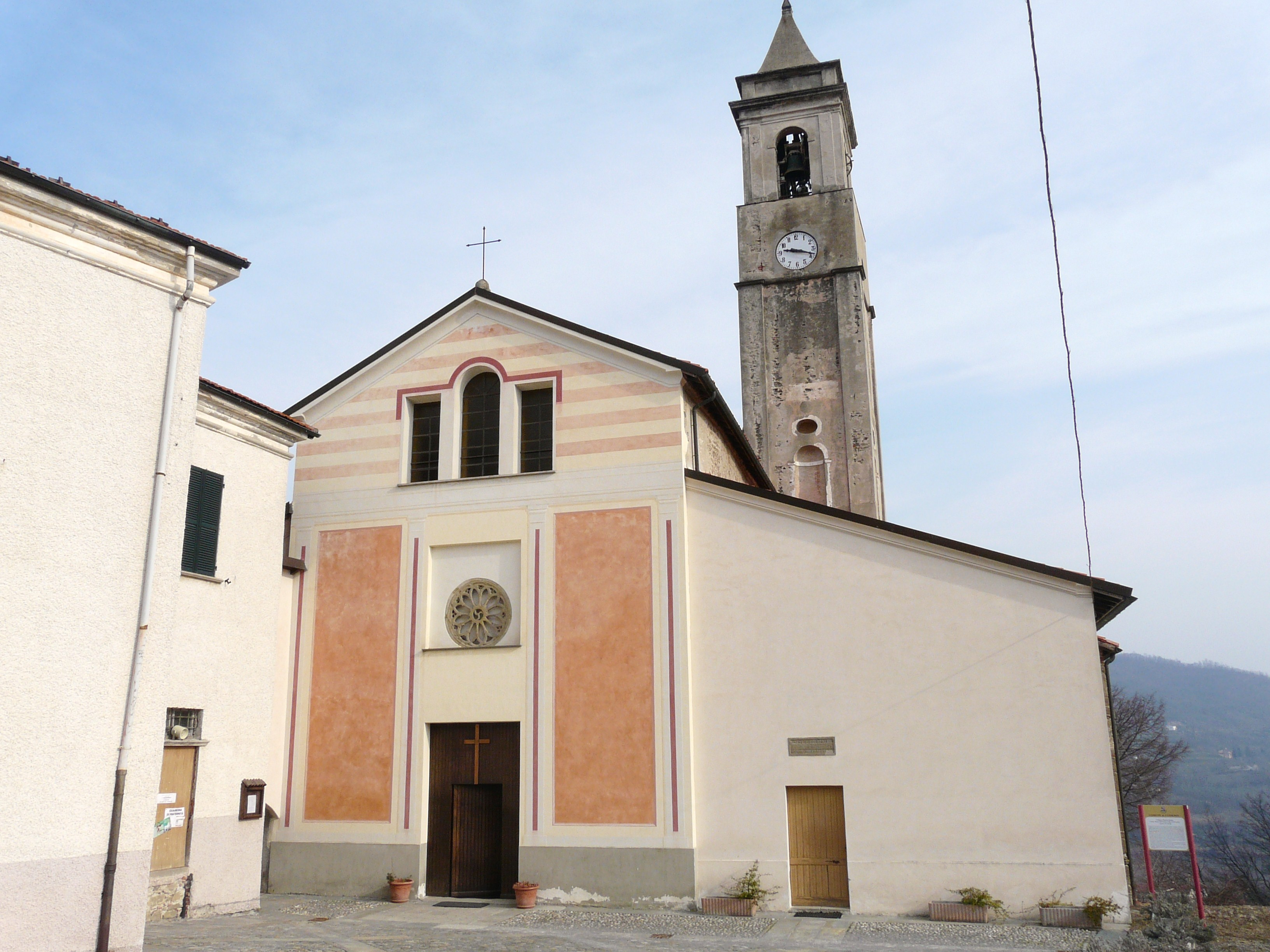
- Church of the Immaculate Conception

- Location within Italy Location within Liguria
- Coordinates: 44°22′N 8°14′E
- Country: Italy
- Region: Liguria
- Province: Savona (SV)
- Frazioni: Lidora

Government
  - Mayor: Roberto Molinaro

Area
  - Total: 13.7 km^{2} (5.3 sq mi)
- Elevation: 516 m (1,693 ft)

Population (31 December 2011)
  - Total: 1,076
  - Density: 78.5/km^{2} (203/sq mi)
- Demonym: Cosseriesi
- Time zone: UTC+1 (CET)
  - Summer (DST): UTC+2 (CEST)
- Postal code: 17017
- Dialing code: 0195
- Website: Official website

Cosseria (Ligurian: Cosceria; Piedmontese: Cusseria) is a comune (municipality) in the Province of Savona in the Italian region Liguria, located about 60 kilometres (37 mi) west of Genoa and about 20 kilometres (12 mi) northwest of Savona.

Cosseria borders the following municipalities: Cairo Montenotte, Carcare, Cengio, Millesimo, and Plodio. The 5th Infantry Division Cosseria took its name from the town.
