= Andrea Vinai =

Italian painter (1824–1893)

Andrea Vinai (1824–1893) was an Italian painter.

== Biography ==
He was born in Pianvignale, Frabosa Sottana, on 4 March 1824, near Mondovì in Piedmont then part of the Kingdom of Sardinia. As a young boy he apprenticed in Cuneo, under the painter Pastore, then traveled to Rome, where he frequented the Academy of San Luca, winning a stipend until 1848. He left Rome to join in the Wars of Italian Independence, and was wounded in the battle of Cornuda at Treviso. For this effort he was awarded a medal of military valor, and rose to level of captain. After the war, he returned to the Piedmont, where he painted mainly religious subjects. For example, in the Cathedral of Mondovi, he painted:

- Presbytery: Coronation of the Virgin and Four Prophets
- Ceiling of San Grato: San Francesco di Sales
- Chapel of San Giuseppe
- Chapel of San Biagio
- Second Chapel at left: Cena Domini

He also painted in the cathedrals of Saluzzo and Ceva; and churches in Carassone, Pallare, Nole, Sommariva Perno, Boves, Carrù, Santa Vittoria d'Alba, Madonna dell'Olmo, Peveragno, Trinità, Garessio, and Cuneo. He completed many religious paintings in Cuneo, Mondovi, Novara, Alessandria, Chiusa di Pesio in Valle Pesio, and Casale Monferrato. In 1846 for the Crematorium of Turin, he completed a portrait of the King and of Pio IX, in 1846. Vinai taught art in public schools.
