= Quiliano =

- Comune
- Comune di Quiliano
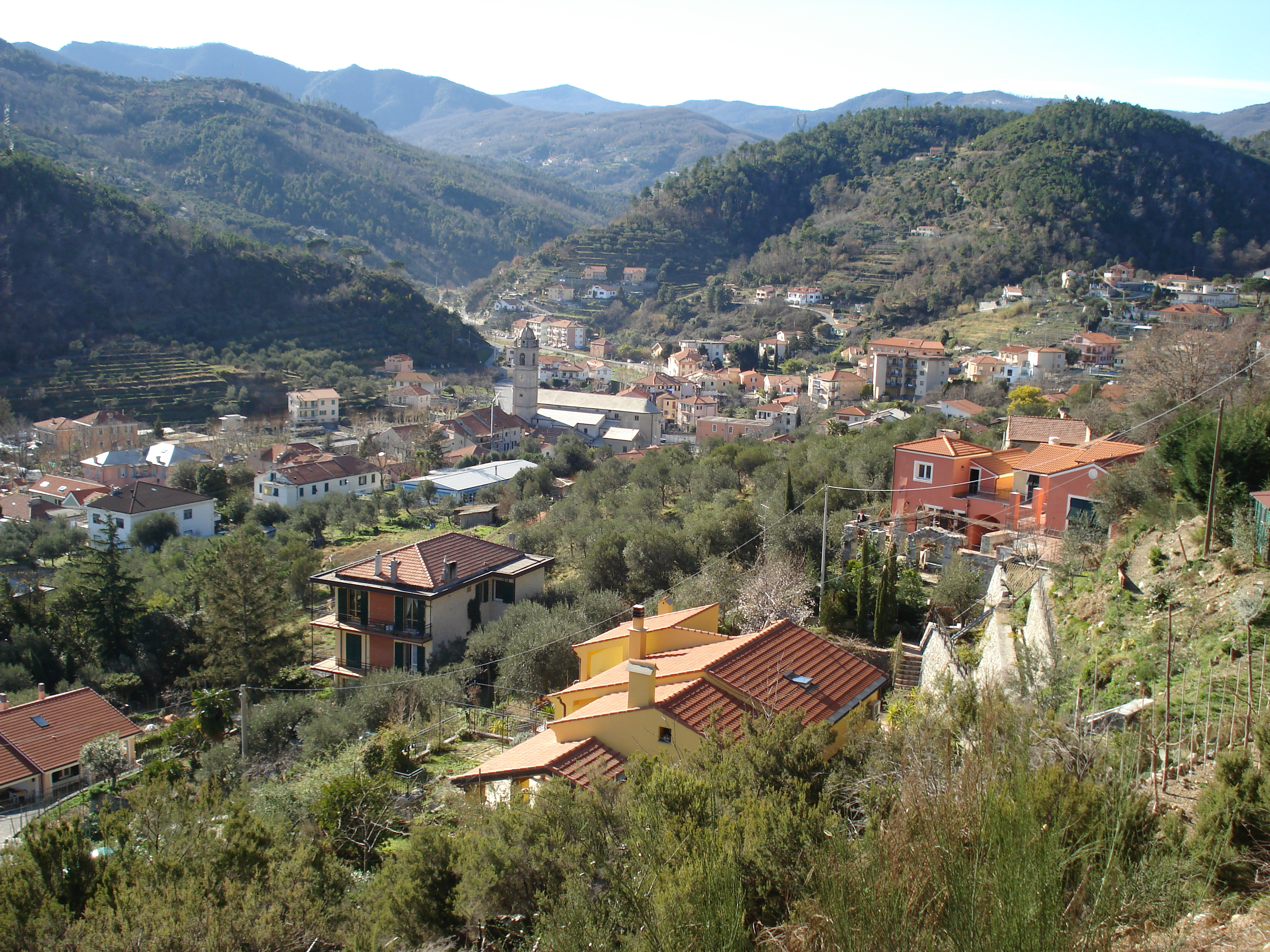
- Quiliano

- Coat of arms

- Location within Italy Location within Liguria
- Coordinates: 44°18′N 8°25′E
- Country: Italy
- Region: Liguria
- Province: Province of Savona (SV)
- Frazioni: Cadibona, Montagna, Roviasca, Valleggia

Area
  - Total: 49.5 km^{2} (19.1 sq mi)

Population (Dec. 2004)
  - Total: 7,225
  - Density: 146/km^{2} (378/sq mi)
- Demonym: Quilianesi
- Time zone: UTC+1 (CET)
  - Summer (DST): UTC+2 (CEST)
- Postal code: 17047
- Dialing code: 019
- Website: Official website

Quiliano (Ligurian: Cuggen) is a comune (municipality) in the Province of Savona in the Italian region Liguria, located about 45 kilometres (28 mi) southwest of Genoa and about 5 kilometres (3 mi) west of Savona. As of 31 December 2004, it had a population of 7,225 and an area of 49.5 square kilometres (19.1 mi^{2}).

The municipality of Quiliano contains these frazioni (subdivisions, mainly villages and hamlets) : Cadibona, astride the watershed between the Alps and Apennines, Valleggia, Montagna, Roviasca, Faia and Tiassano.

In the environs of Quiliano remain several Roman archaeological sites: a Roman bridge still functions in the valley of Quazzola and remains of a Roman villa may be seen at San Pietro in Carpignano.

Quiliano borders the following municipalities: Altare, Mallare, Orco Feglino, Savona, Vado Ligure, and Vezzi Portio.

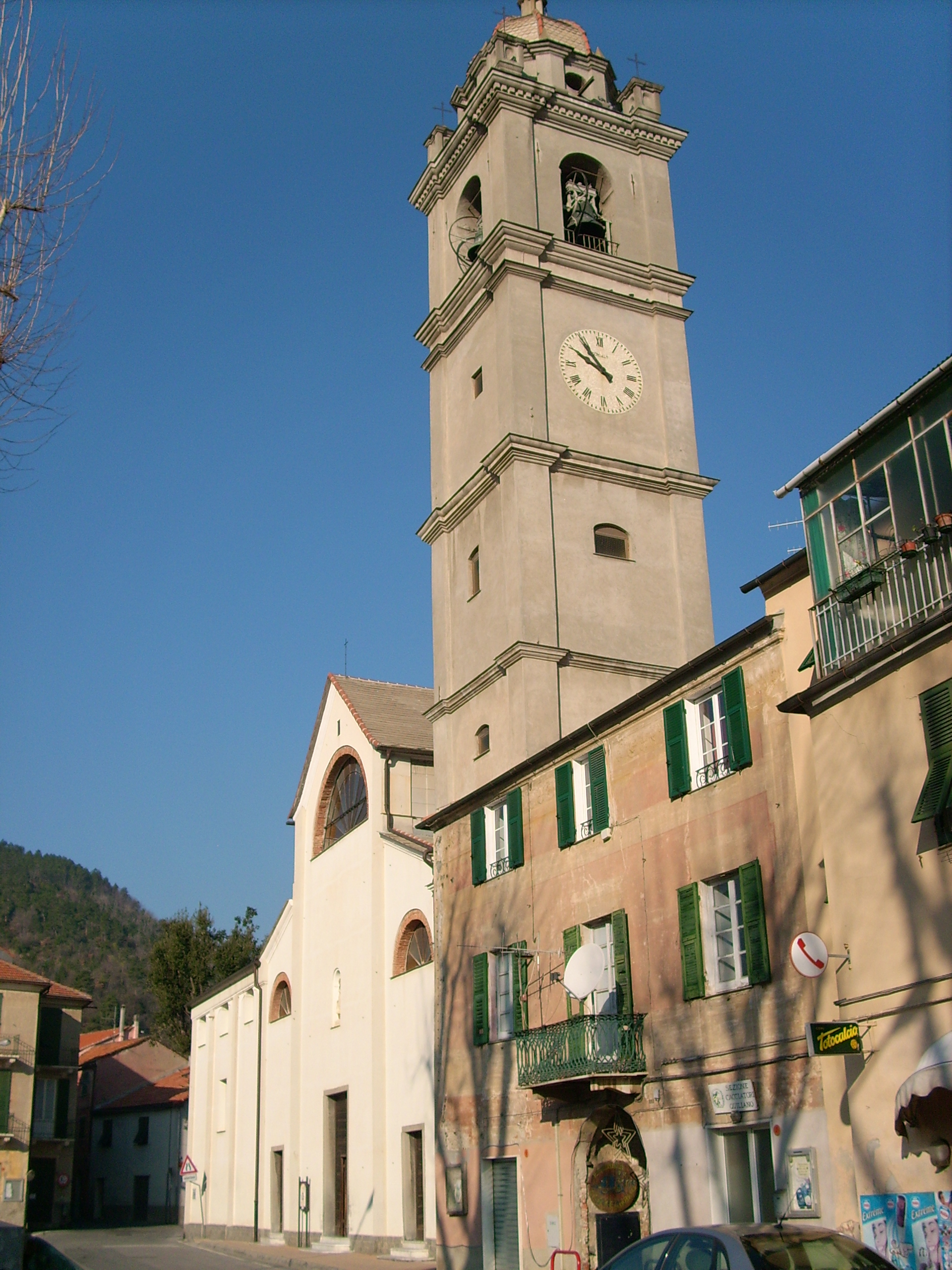
Church of San Lorenzo and its campanile

== Demographic evolution ==
Historical population

Year	Pop.	±%
1861	4,010	—
1871	3,571	−10.9%
1881	4,154	+16.3%
1901	4,469	+7.6%
1911	5,148	+15.2%

Year	Pop.	±%
1921	5,807	+12.8%
1931	6,018	+3.6%
1936	6,160	+2.4%
1951	6,079	−1.3%
1961	6,295	+3.6%

Year	Pop.	±%
1971	6,742	+7.1%
1981	7,301	+8.3%
1991	7,361	+0.8%
2001	7,032	−4.5%

Source: Data from ISTAT

== Twin towns ==
Quiliano is twinned with:

- Municipality of Ajdovščina, Slovenia (1972)
- Great Wyrley, United Kingdom (2000)
- Mâcon, France (2009)
