= Mallare =

- Comune
- Comune di Mallare
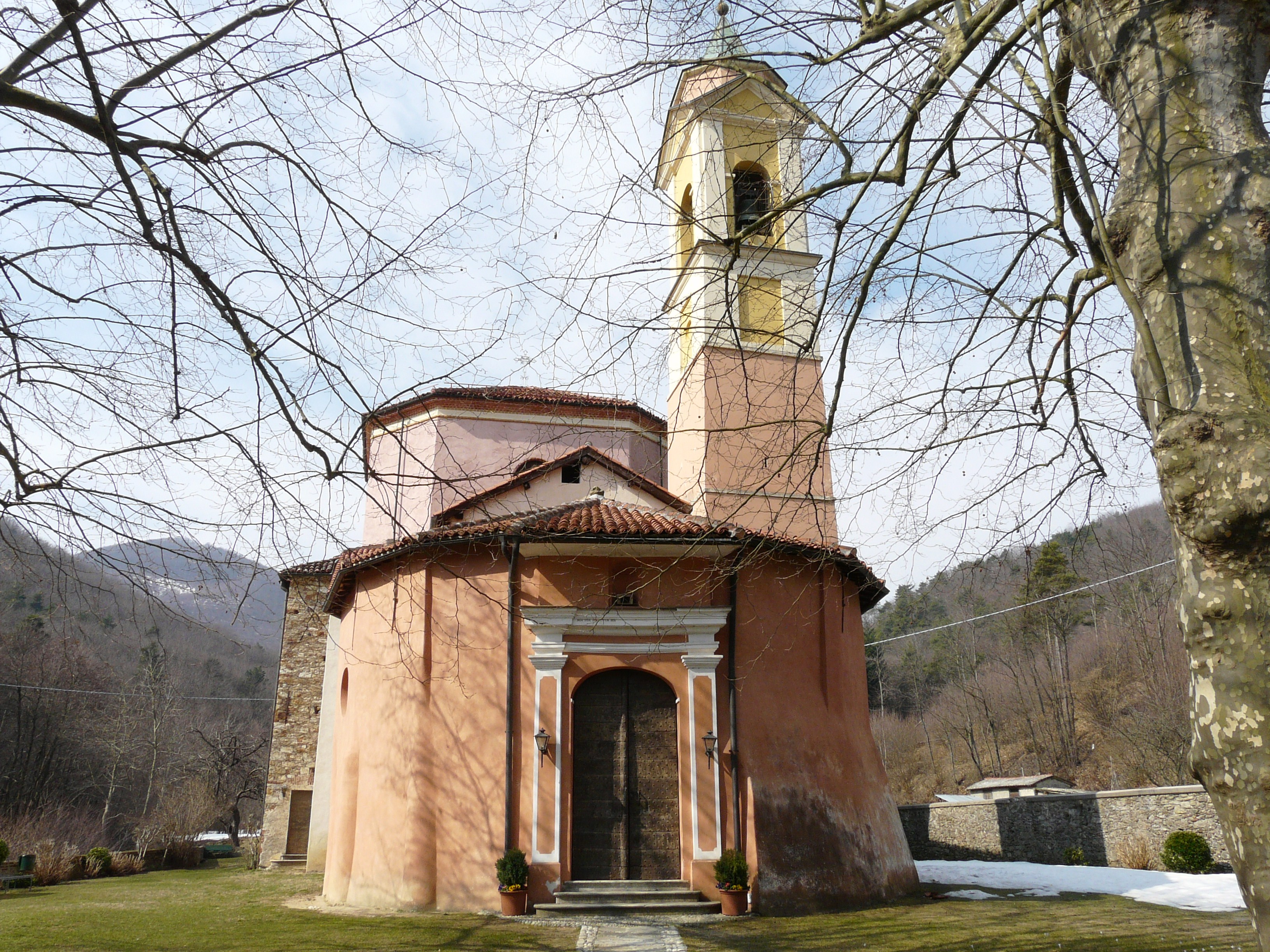
- Sanctuary of Santa Maria dell'Eremita.

- Location within Italy Location within Liguria
- Coordinates: 44°17′N 8°18′E
- Country: Italy
- Region: Liguria
- Province: Savona (SV)
- Frazioni: Grenni, Eremita, Le Acque, Codevilla, Fucine, Montefreddo, Olano

Government
  - Mayor: Piero Giribone

Area
  - Total: 31.73 km^{2} (12.25 sq mi)
- Elevation: 450 m (1,480 ft)

Population (30 September 2017)
  - Total: 1,115
  - Density: 35.14/km^{2} (91.01/sq mi)
- Demonym: Mallaresi
- Time zone: UTC+1 (CET)
  - Summer (DST): UTC+2 (CEST)
- Postal code: 17045
- Dialing code: 019
- Website: Official website

Mallare (Ligurian: Molre, locally Malle; Piedmontese: Mälre) is a comune (municipality) in the Province of Savona in the Italian region Liguria, located about 50 kilometres (31 mi) southwest of Genoa and about 15 kilometres (9 mi) west of Savona.

Mallare borders the following municipalities: Altare, Bormida, Calice Ligure, Carcare, Orco Feglino, Pallare, and Quiliano.
