= Orco Feglino =

- Comune
- Comune di Orco Feglino
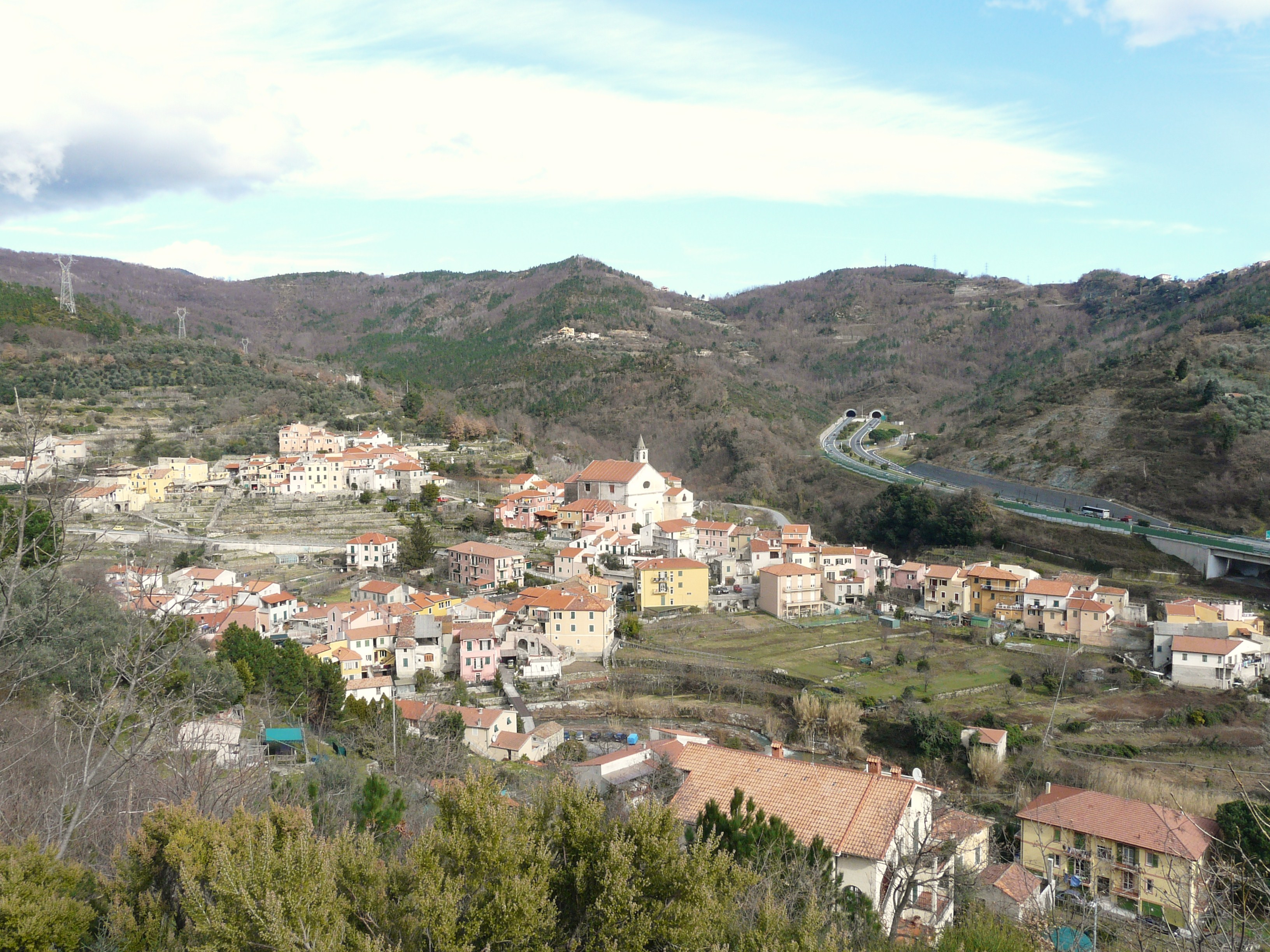
- Orco Feglino

- Coat of arms

- Location within Italy Location within Liguria
- Coordinates: 44°13′N 8°19′E
- Country: Italy
- Region: Liguria
- Province: Savona (SV)
- Frazioni: Feglino, Orco

Government
  - Mayor: Milena Scosseria

Area
  - Total: 17.72 km^{2} (6.84 sq mi)

Population (31 December 2005)
  - Total: 856
  - Density: 48.3/km^{2} (125/sq mi)
- Demonym(s): Orchesi and Feglinesi
- Time zone: UTC+1 (CET)
  - Summer (DST): UTC+2 (CEST)
- Postal code: 17020
- Dialing code: 019

Orco Feglino (Ligurian: Orco Fëin) is a comune (municipality) in the Province of Savona in the Italian region Liguria, located about 50 kilometres (31 mi) southwest of Genoa and about 30 kilometres (19 mi) southwest of Savona in the upper valley of the Aquila stream. It consists of the two villages of Orco and Feglino.

Orco Feglino borders the following municipalities: Calice Ligure, Finale Ligure, Mallare, Quiliano and Vezzi Portio.

== History ==
The two burghs were part of the Marca Aleramica in the 10th, and in 1091 they became possession of Boniface del Vasto and, from 1142, of the Del Carretto family, who built a castle in Orco.

In the 16th century it was acquired by Spain, to which it belonged until 1713, when it passed under the Republic of Genoa. Later it was part of the Kingdoms of Sardinia and Italy.

== Main sights ==
- Remains of the castle of Orco
- Church of San Lorenzino (12th–14th centuries), with frescoes from the 15th and 16th centuries. The bell tower, with two orders of mullioned windows, is from the 14th century.
- Baroque church of San Lorenzo, in the frazione of Feglino.

== Population trend ==
Historical population

Year	Pop.	±%
1861	1,170	—
1871	1,316	+12.5%
1881	1,142	−13.2%
1901	1,077	−5.7%
1911	1,044	−3.1%

Year	Pop.	±%
1921	1,003	−3.9%
1931	835	−16.7%
1936	921	+10.3%
1951	859	−6.7%
1961	867	+0.9%

Year	Pop.	±%
1971	700	−19.3%
1981	756	+8.0%
1991	824	+9.0%
2001	814	−1.2%

Source: Data from ISTAT

== Twin towns ==
Orco Feglino is twinned with:

- Le Crestet, France
