= Murialdo =

- Comune
- Comune di Murialdo
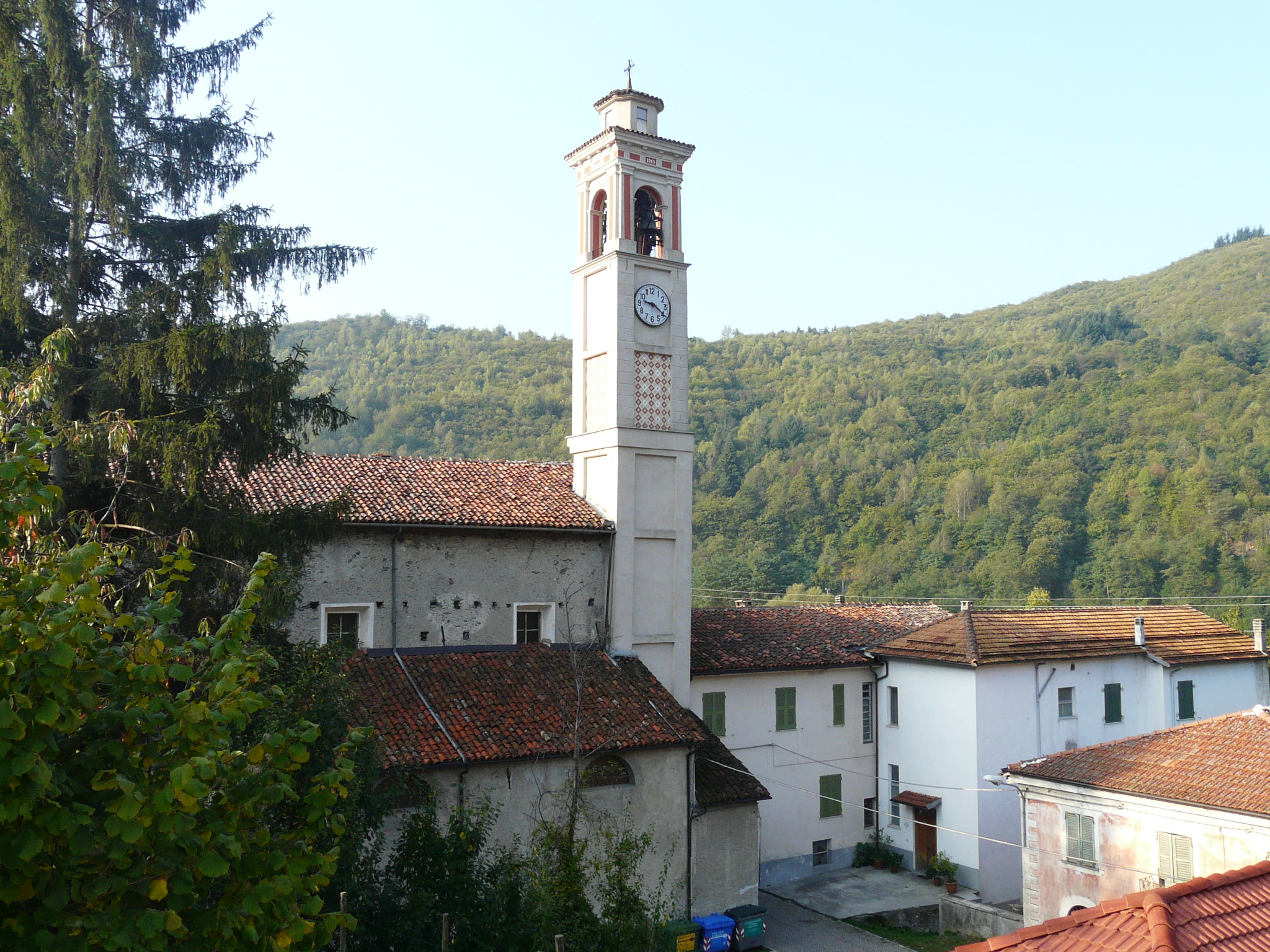
- Saint Anthony Church

- Flag Coat of arms

- Location within Italy Location within Liguria
- Coordinates: 44°19′00″N 8°09′50″E
- Country: Italy
- Region: Liguria
- Province: Province of Savona (SV)
- Frazioni: Colle dei Giovetti, Isolagrande, Piano, Ponte, Riofreddo, Valle

Area
  - Total: 37.5 km^{2} (14.5 sq mi)

Population (Dec. 2004)
  - Total: 882
  - Density: 23.5/km^{2} (60.9/sq mi)
- Time zone: UTC+1 (CET)
  - Summer (DST): UTC+2 (CEST)
- Postal code: 17010
- Dialing code: 019

Murialdo (Ligurian: Moriaodo; Piedmontese: Muriaud) is a comune (municipality) in the Province of Savona in the Italian region Liguria, located about 60 kilometres (37 mi) west of Genoa and about 25 kilometres (16 mi) west of Savona. As of 31 December 2004, it had a population of 882 and an area of 37.5 square kilometres (14.5 mi^{2}).

The municipality of Murialdo contains the "Borgate" (subdivisions, mainly villages and hamlets): Piani, Piavata, Piano, Ponte, Bonetti, Valle, Isolagrande and Riofreddo.

Murialdo borders the following municipalities: Calizzano, Castelnuovo di Ceva, Massimino, Millesimo, Osiglia, Perlo, Priero, and Roccavignale.

== Demographic evolution ==
Historical population

Year	Pop.	±%
1861	2,322	—
1871	2,272	−2.2%
1881	2,156	−5.1%
1901	2,023	−6.2%
1911	1,801	−11.0%

Year	Pop.	±%
1921	1,861	+3.3%
1931	1,775	−4.6%
1936	1,784	+0.5%
1951	1,792	+0.4%
1961	1,353	−24.5%

Year	Pop.	±%
1971	1,153	−14.8%
1981	1,004	−12.9%
1991	892	−11.2%
2001	871	−2.4%

Source: Data from ISTAT

== Twin towns ==
Murialdo is twinned with:

- Schweich, Germany (1994)

== Related articles ==
- Monte Camulera
