= Port of Savona =

Port in Savona, Italy

Coordinates: 44°18′43″N 8°29′28″E

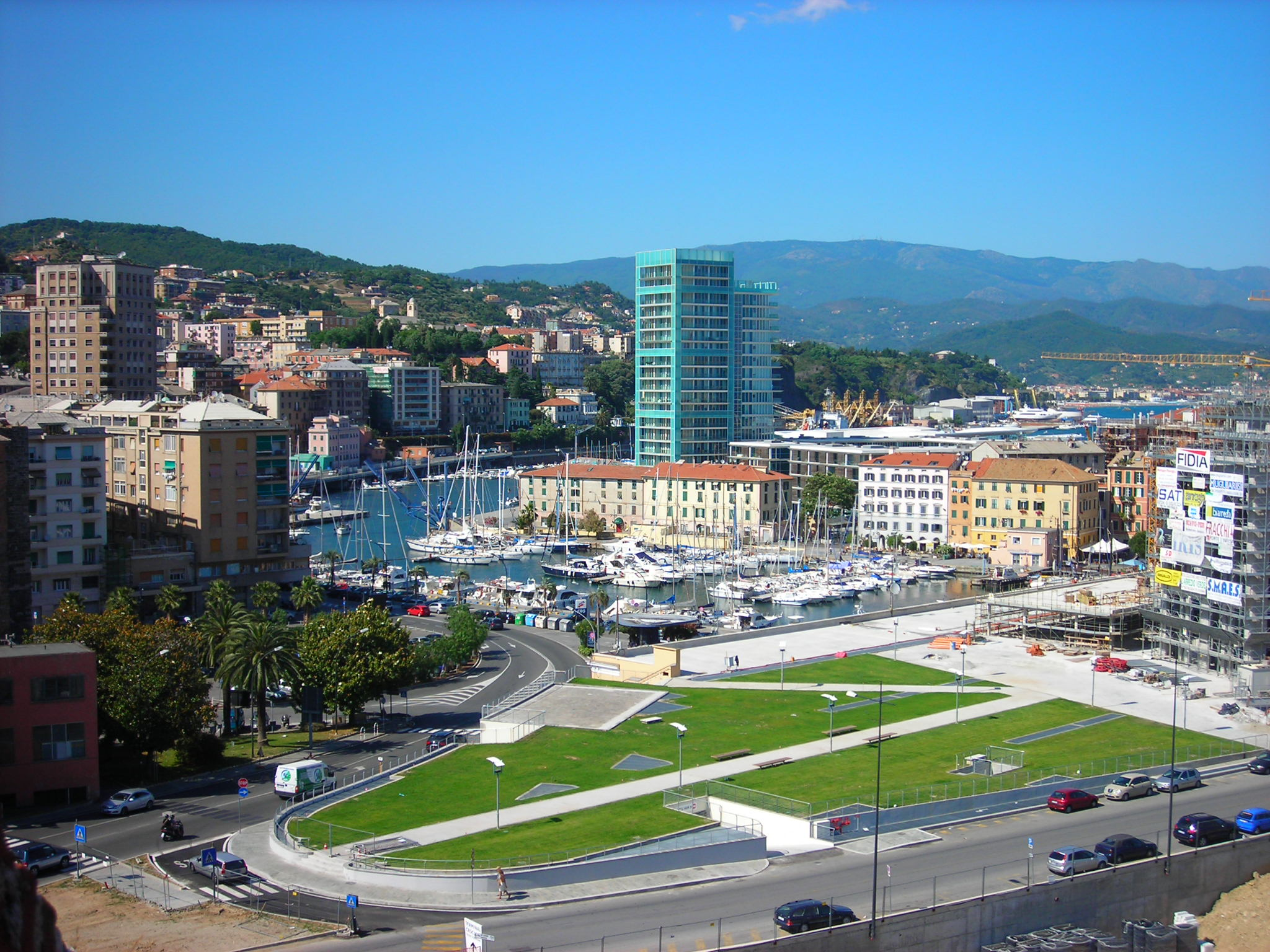
Port of Savona

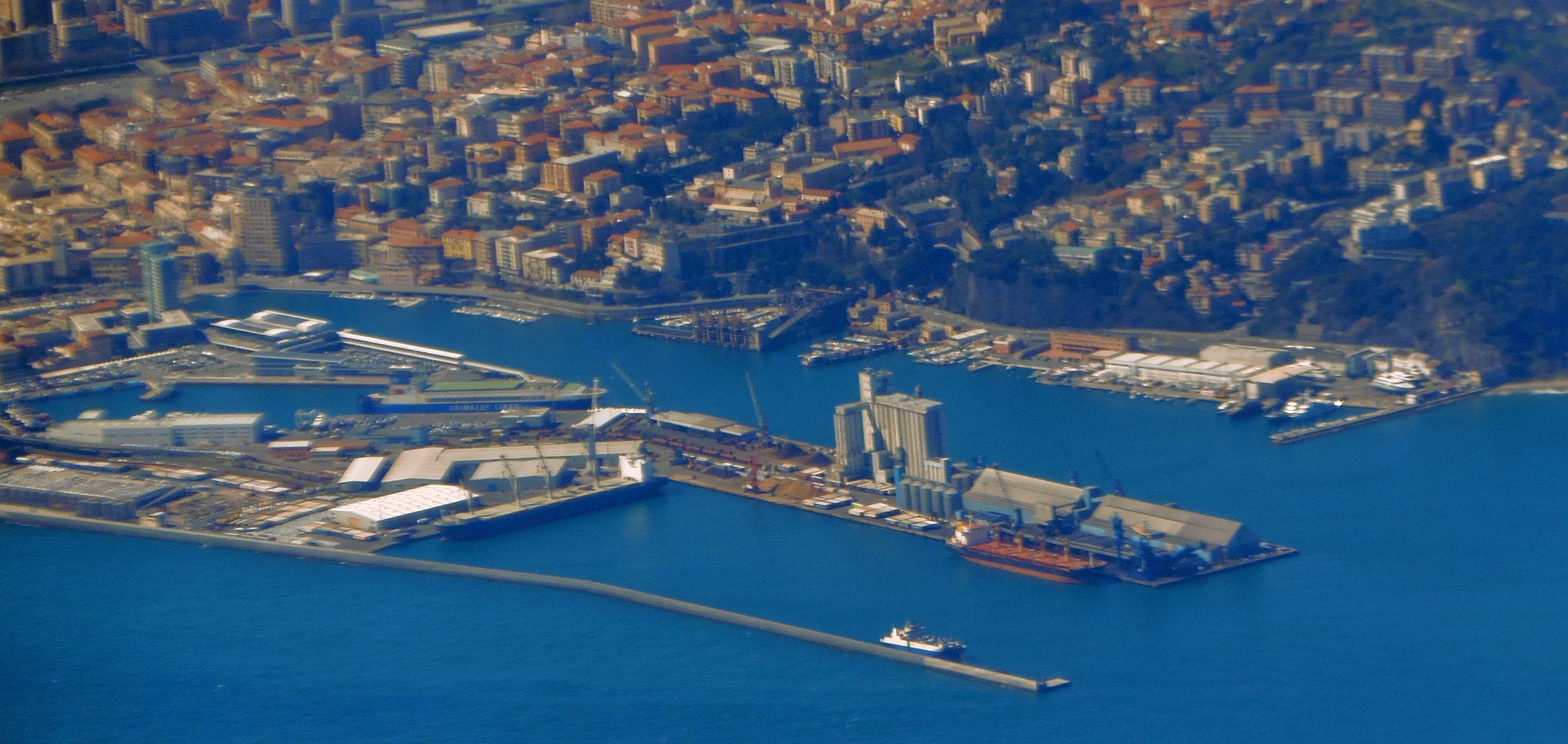
Aerial view

Port of Savona (Italian: Porto di Savona) is a port in Savona, Italy. It is the fourth cruise port by number of passengers in Italy, with 1,300,000 people in 2013. Adjacent to the historic centre of Savona, the port of Savona has been active from the Middle Ages and has always been crucial for the economy of the regional capital and its hinterland. A major terminal for ferries, there are ferry links to Corsica and Sardinia through the companies Corsica Ferries and Saremar.
