= Province of Savona =

Province of Italy

Coordinates: 44°18′26.41″N 8°29′50.82″E

Province of Savona Provincia di Savona (Italian) Provinsa de Sann-a (Ligurian)
- Province
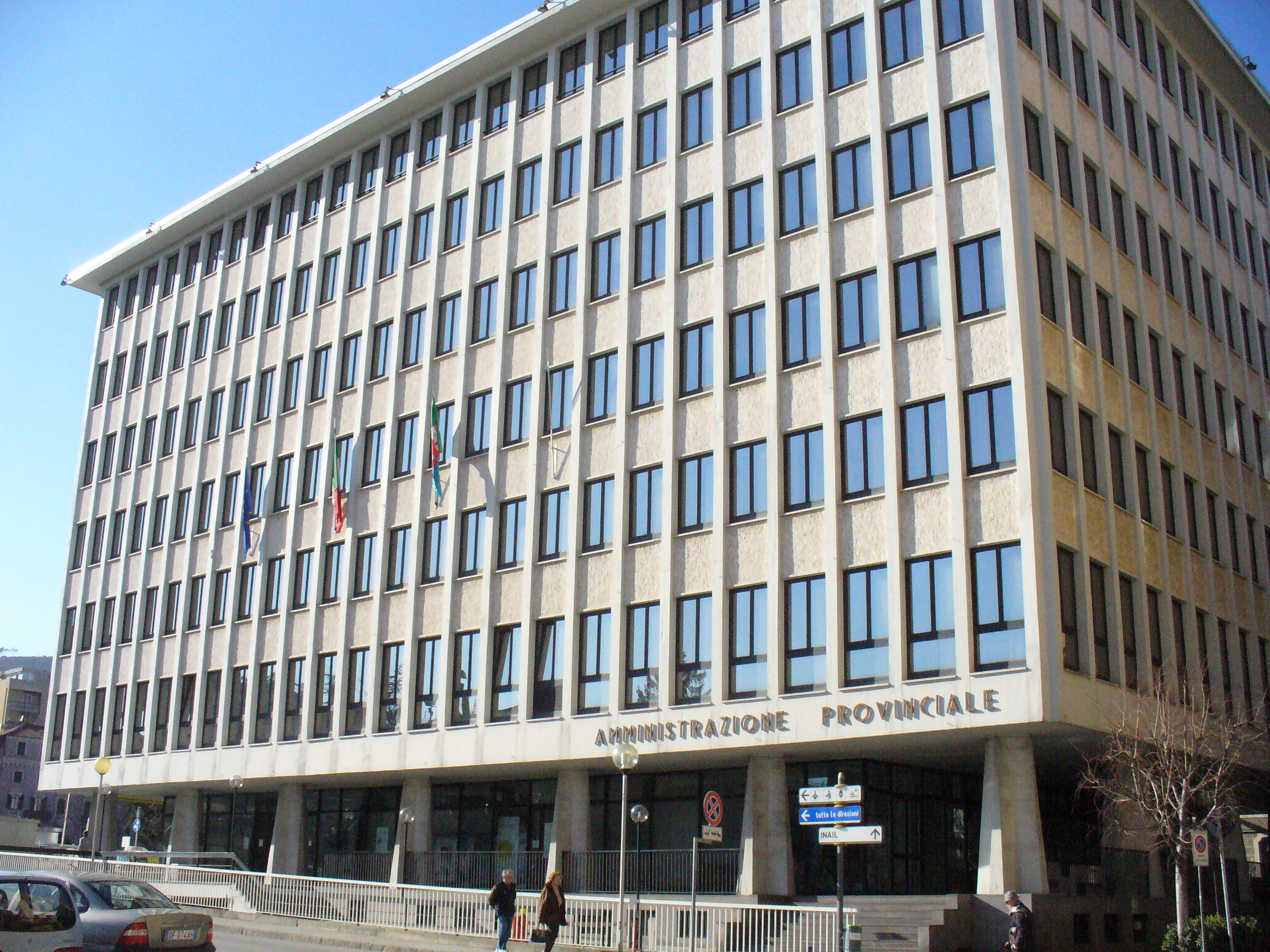
- The provincial seat

- Flag Coat of arms

- Location of the province of Savona in Italy
- Country: Italy
- Region: Liguria
- Capital(s): Savona
- Municipalities: 69

Government
  - President: Mauro Demichelis

Area
  - Total: 1,546.29 km^{2} (597.03 sq mi)

Population (2026)
  - Total: 266,910
  - Density: 172.61/km^{2} (447.07/sq mi)

GDP
  - Total: €7.667 billion (2015)
  - Per capita: €27,221 (2015)
- Time zone: UTC+1 (CET)
  - Summer (DST): UTC+2 (CEST)
- Postal code: 12071, 17010, 17012-17015, 17017, 17019-17028, 17030-17035, 17037, 17039-17043, 17046-17047, 17100
- Telephone prefix: 019, 0182
- Vehicle registration: SV
- ISTAT code: 009

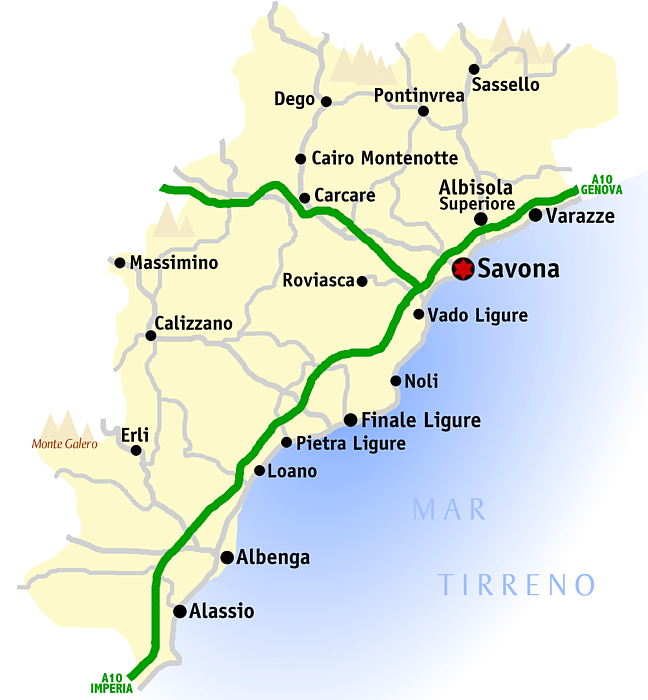
Map of the province of Savona

The province of Savona (Italian: provincia di Savona; Ligurian: provinsa de Sann-a) is a province in the region of Liguria in northern Italy. Its capital is the city of Savona.

The province has a population of 266,910 in an area of 1,546.29 square kilometres (597.03 sq mi) across its 69 municipalities.

== History ==
Savona was first settled by the Ligurian tribe of the Sabazi, who supported the Carthaginians in the Punic Wars. This support of the Carthaginian Empire led to Savona being conquered by the Roman Empire. During the Middle Ages, Savona allied with Frederick II, Holy Roman Emperor and fought against Genoa. In 1440 it also fought against Genoa during its war against the Visconti of Milan; in response, Genoa sacked the city and destroyed the port and shipping. It allied itself with the French in the 16th century, but this campaign also failed and resulted in Genoa invading the area again, this time destroying three loaded ships and the port.

It was occupied by Napoleon's French forces at the start of the 19th century, but the area was later conquered from Napoleon by the Kingdom of Sardinia. Following this, ironworks were founded in Savona and the port revived.

== Geography ==
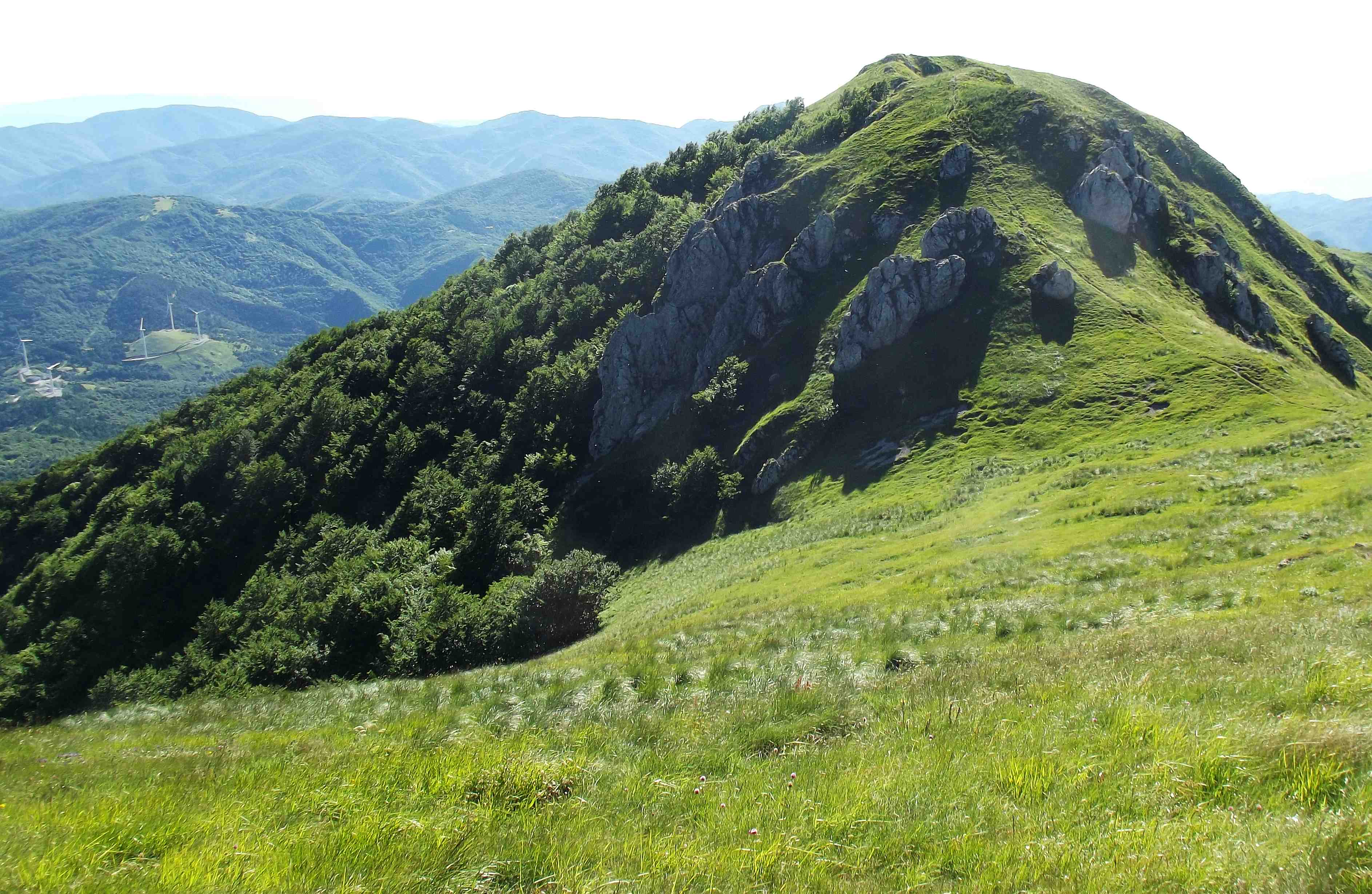
Monte Galero

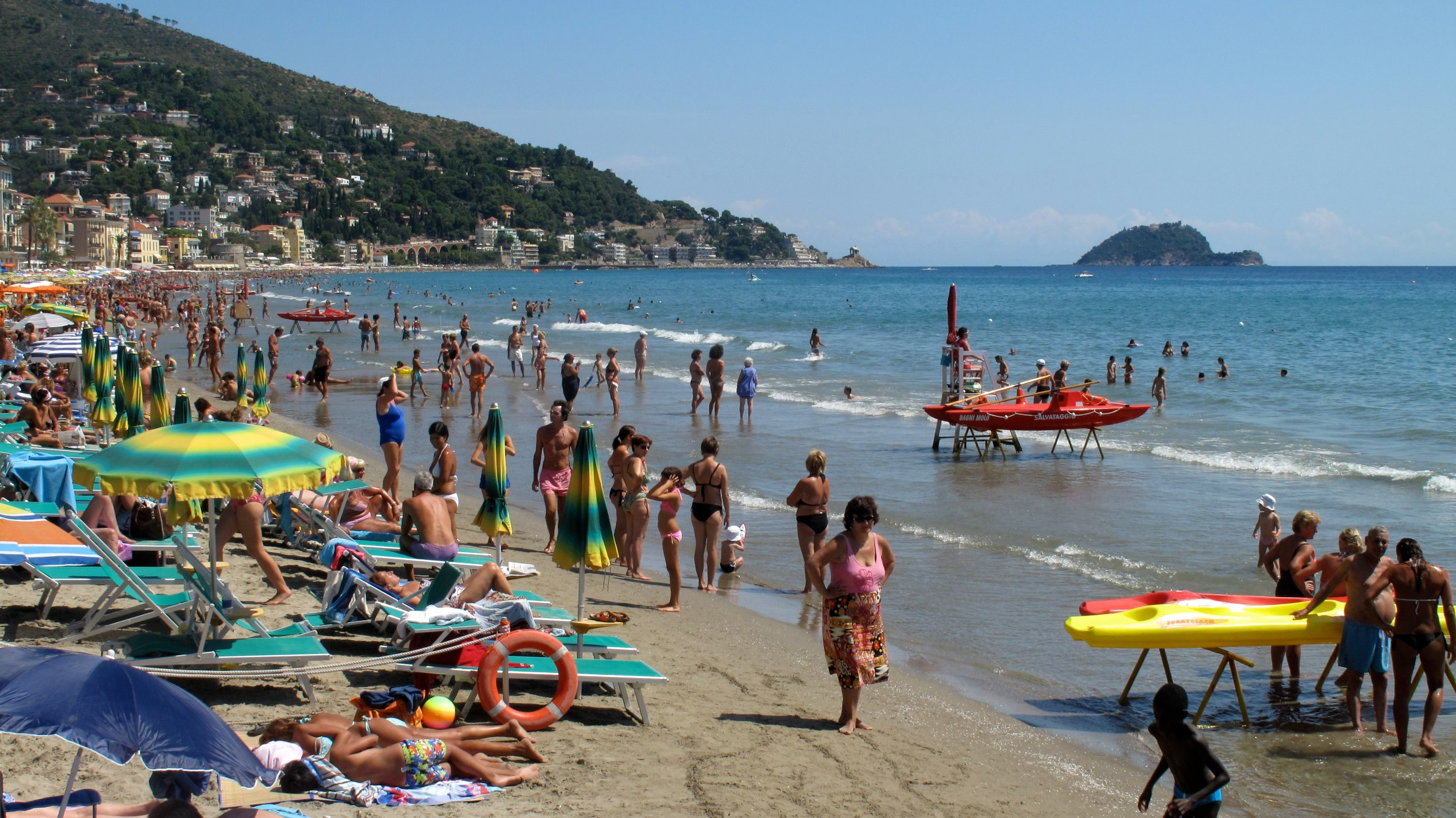
Beach in Alassio

The province of Savona is one of four provinces in the region of Liguria, which forms a coastal strip in the northwest of Italy. Savona has a long coastline on the Gulf of Genoa; the province of Imperia lies to the west and the Metropolitan City of Genoa lies to the east. The region of Piedmont lies inland, with the province of Cuneo to the northwest and the provinces of Asti and Alessandria to the north. The provincial capital is the city of Savona. Inland is the mountain chain formed by the Ligurian Alps and the Apennine Mountains.

== Government ==
=== Municipalities ===
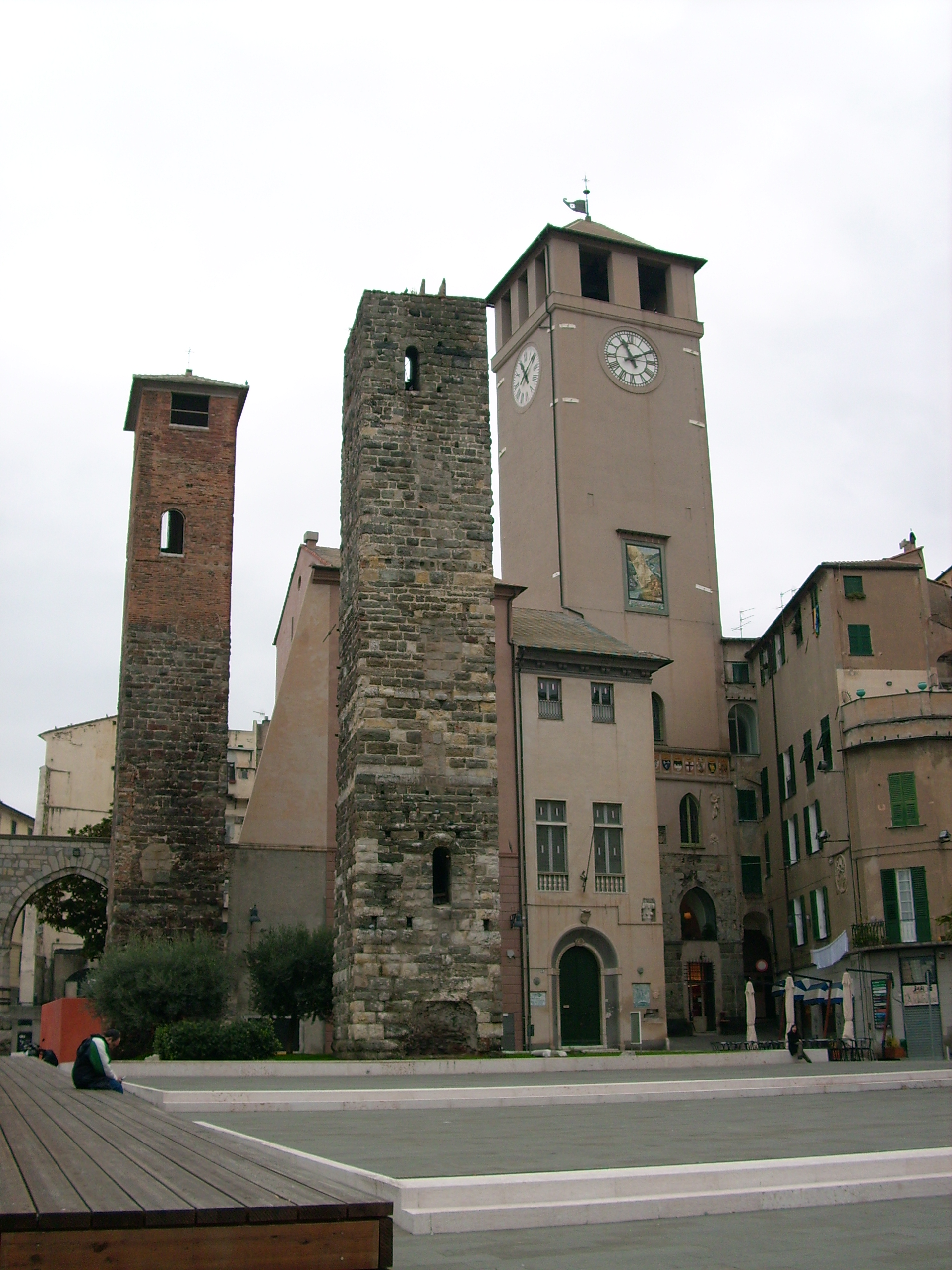
Savona

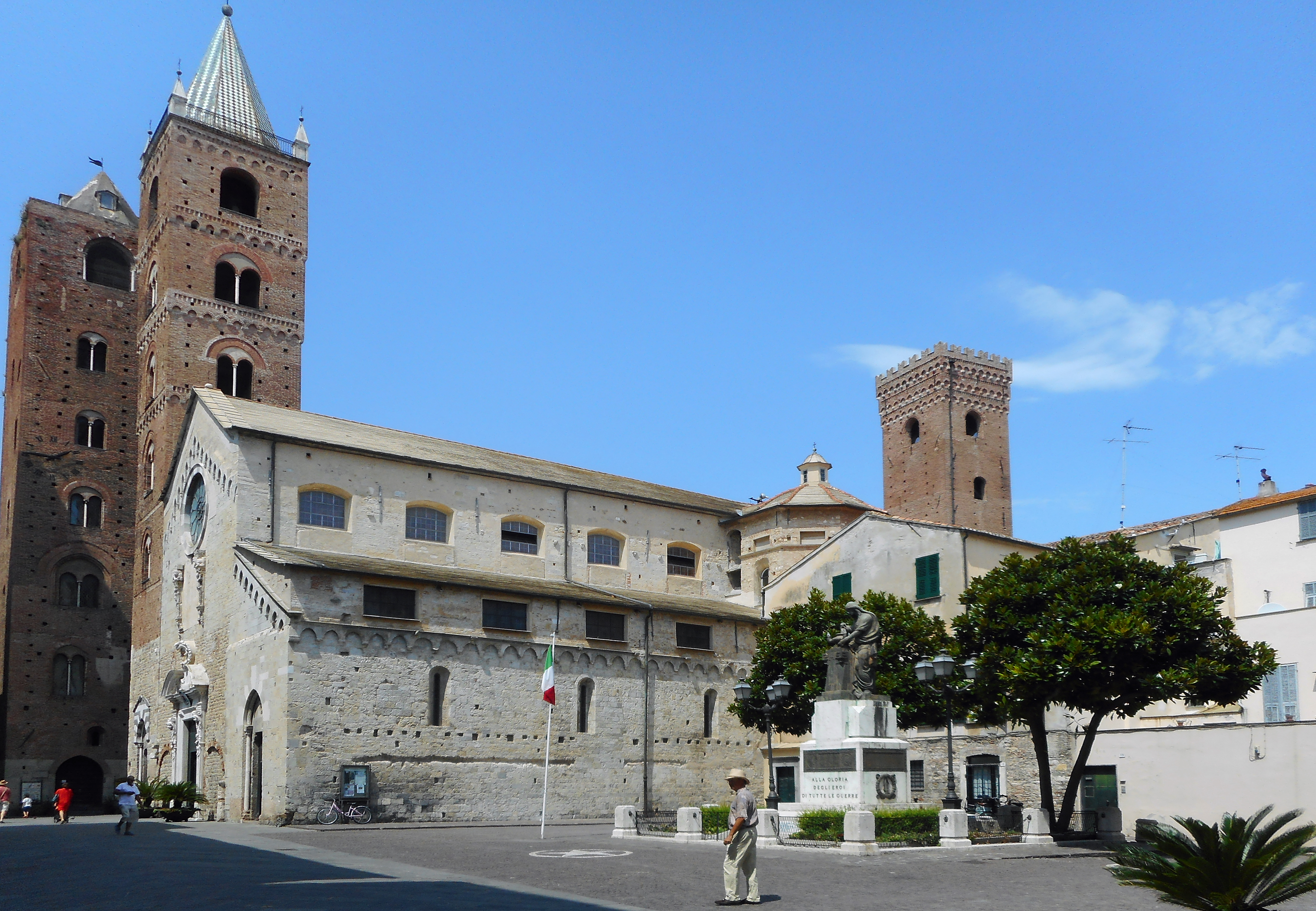
Albenga

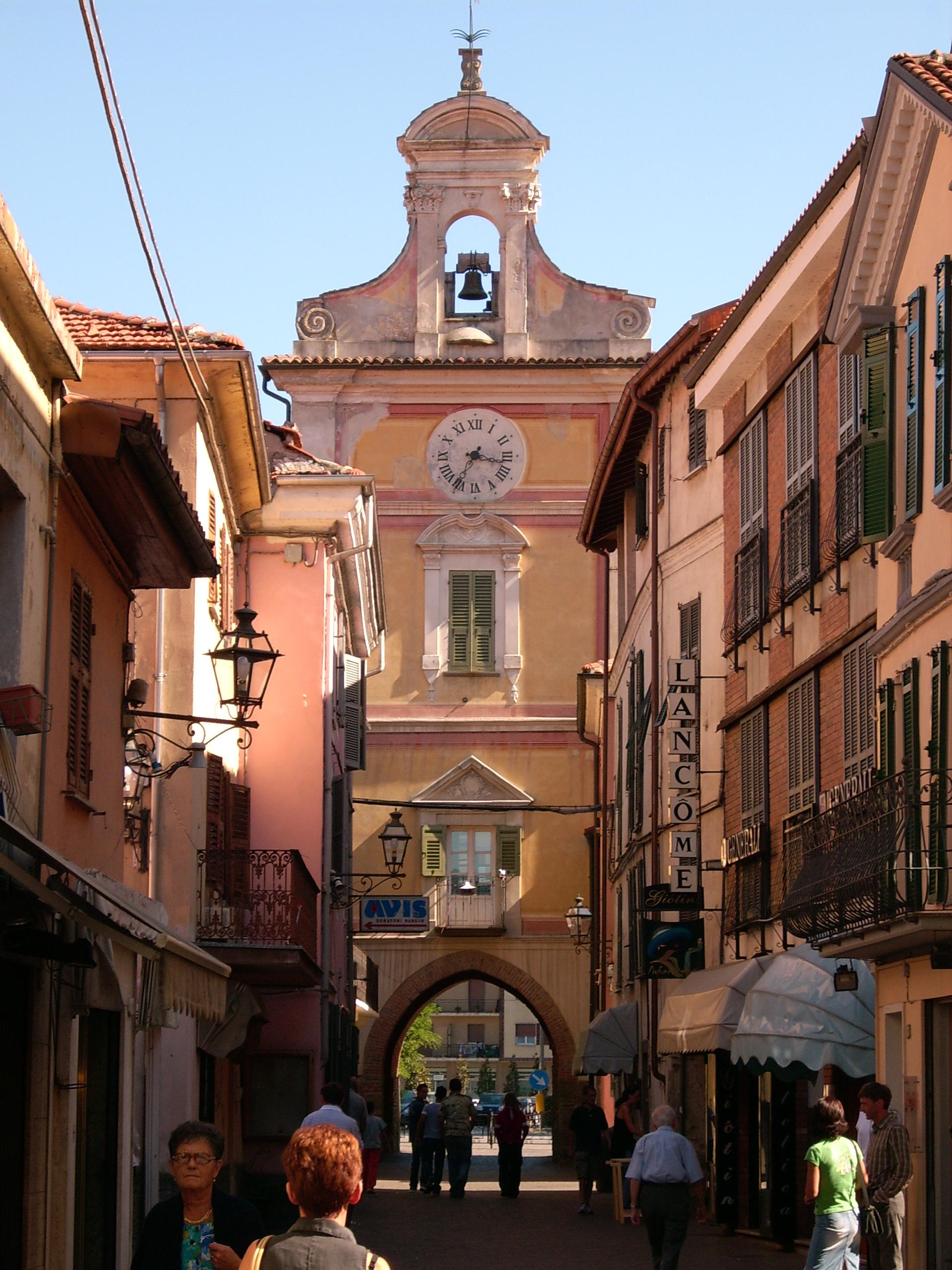
Cairo Montenotte

The province has 69 municipalities:

- Alassio
- Albenga
- Albisola Superiore
- Albissola Marina
- Altare
- Andora
- Arnasco
- Balestrino
- Bardineto
- Bergeggi
- Boissano
- Borghetto Santo Spirito
- Borgio Verezzi
- Bormida
- Cairo Montenotte
- Calice Ligure
- Calizzano
- Carcare
- Casanova Lerrone
- Castelbianco
- Castelvecchio di Rocca Barbena
- Celle Ligure
- Cengio
- Ceriale
- Cisano sul Neva
- Cosseria
- Dego
- Erli
- Finale Ligure
- Garlenda
- Giustenice
- Giusvalla
- Laigueglia
- Loano
- Magliolo
- Mallare
- Massimino
- Millesimo
- Mioglia
- Murialdo
- Nasino
- Noli
- Onzo
- Orco Feglino
- Ortovero
- Osiglia
- Pallare
- Piana Crixia
- Pietra Ligure
- Plodio
- Pontinvrea
- Quiliano
- Rialto
- Roccavignale
- Sassello
- Savona
- Spotorno
- Stella
- Stellanello
- Testico
- Toirano
- Tovo San Giacomo
- Urbe
- Vado Ligure
- Varazze
- Vendone
- Vezzi Portio
- Villanova d'Albenga
- Zuccarello

== Demographics ==
As of 2026, the population is 266,910, of which 48.6% are male, and 51.4% are female. Minors make up 12.2% of the population, and seniors make up 30.4%.

Historical population

Year	Pop.	±%
1861	144,191	—
1871	152,008	+5.4%
1881	156,813	+3.2%
1901	169,296	+8.0%
1911	183,689	+8.5%
1921	201,098	+9.5%
1931	212,082	+5.5%
1936	219,108	+3.3%

Year	Pop.	±%
1951	237,829	+8.5%
1961	262,842	+10.5%
1971	296,043	+12.6%
1981	297,675	+0.6%
1991	284,647	−4.4%
2001	272,528	−4.3%
2011	281,028	+3.1%
2021	268,038	−4.6%

Source: ISTAT

=== Immigration ===
As of 2025, immigrants make up 13.2% of the population. The 5 largest foreign countries of birth are Albania, Morocco, Romania, Ukraine, and Egypt.

== Transport ==
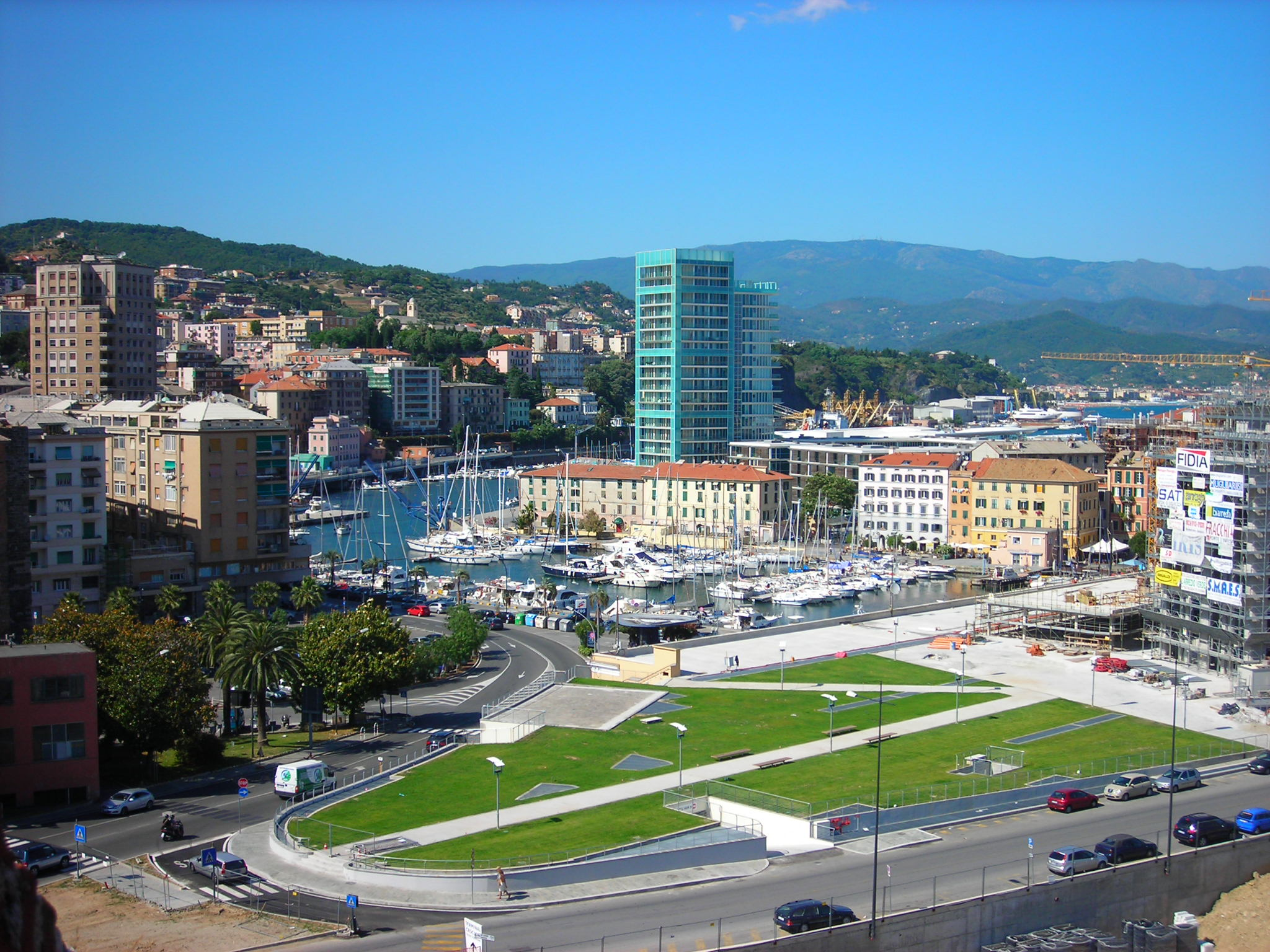
The touristic port of Savona

=== Motorways ===
- Autostrada A6: Turin-Savona
- Autostrada A10: Genoa-Ventimiglia

=== Railway lines ===
- Genoa–Ventimiglia railway
- Marseille–Ventimiglia railway
- Turin–Fossano–Savona railway
- Tenda line

=== Ports ===
- Port of Savona

=== Airports ===
- Riviera Airport

== See also ==
- Lake Osiglia
