= Pallare =

- Comune
- Comune di Pallare
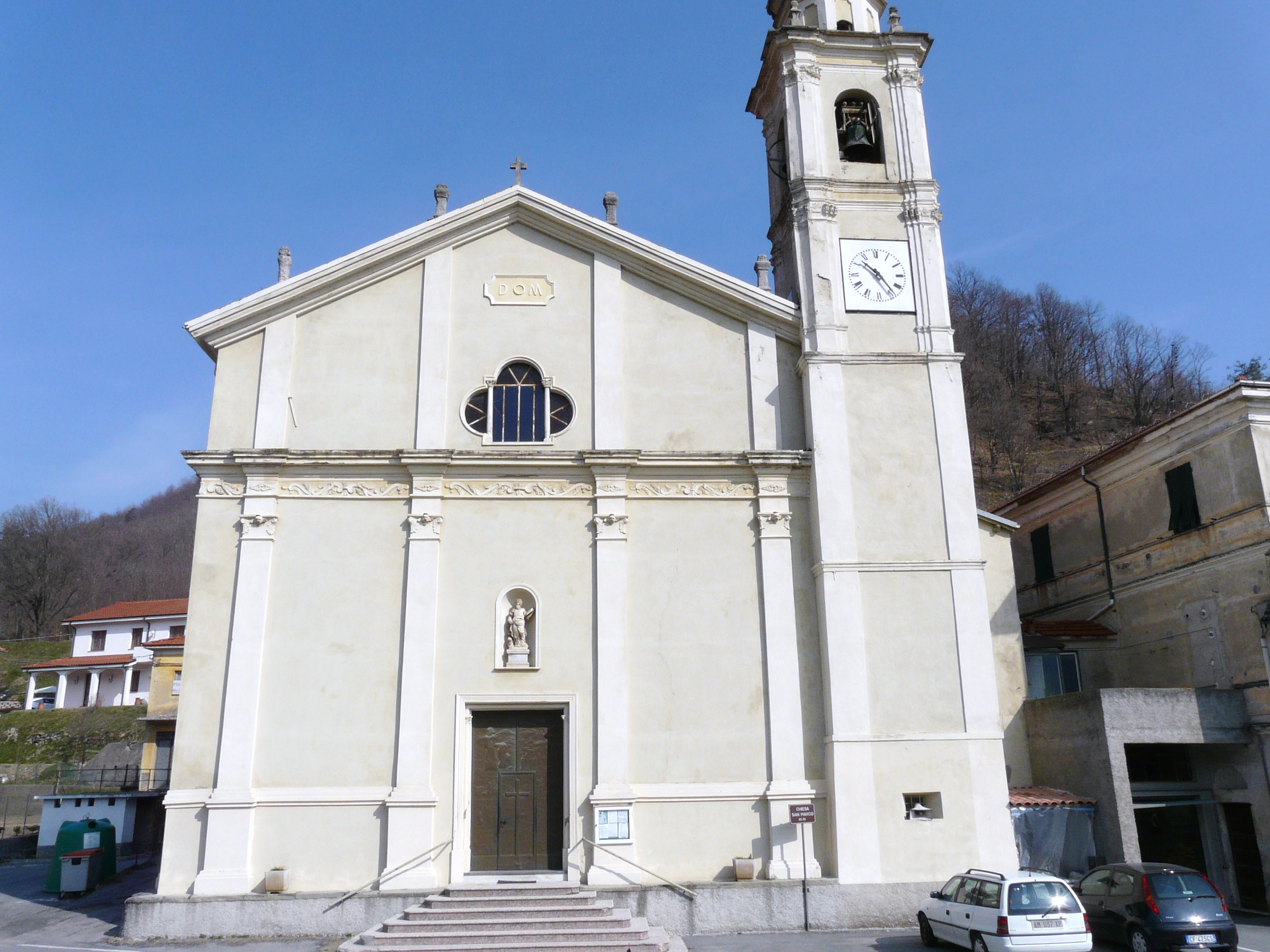
- Saint Mark Church

- Coat of arms

- Location within Italy Location within Liguria
- Coordinates: 44°20′N 8°17′E
- Country: Italy
- Region: Liguria
- Province: Savona (SV)

Government
  - Mayor: Giovanni Delfino

Area
  - Total: 21.33 km^{2} (8.24 sq mi)
- Elevation: 404 m (1,325 ft)

Population (31 December 2017)
  - Total: 952
  - Density: 44.6/km^{2} (116/sq mi)
- Demonym: Pallaresi
- Time zone: UTC+1 (CET)
  - Summer (DST): UTC+2 (CEST)
- Postal code: 17040
- Dialing code: 019
- Website: Official website

Pallare (Ligurian: Palëre; Piedmontese: Pallër) is a comune (municipality) in the Province of Savona in the Italian region Liguria, located about 50 kilometres (31 mi) west of Genoa and about 15 kilometres (9 mi) west of Savona.

Pallare borders the following municipalities: Bormida, Carcare, Mallare, Millesimo, Osiglia, and Plodio.
