= Millesimo =

- Comune
- Comune di Millesimo
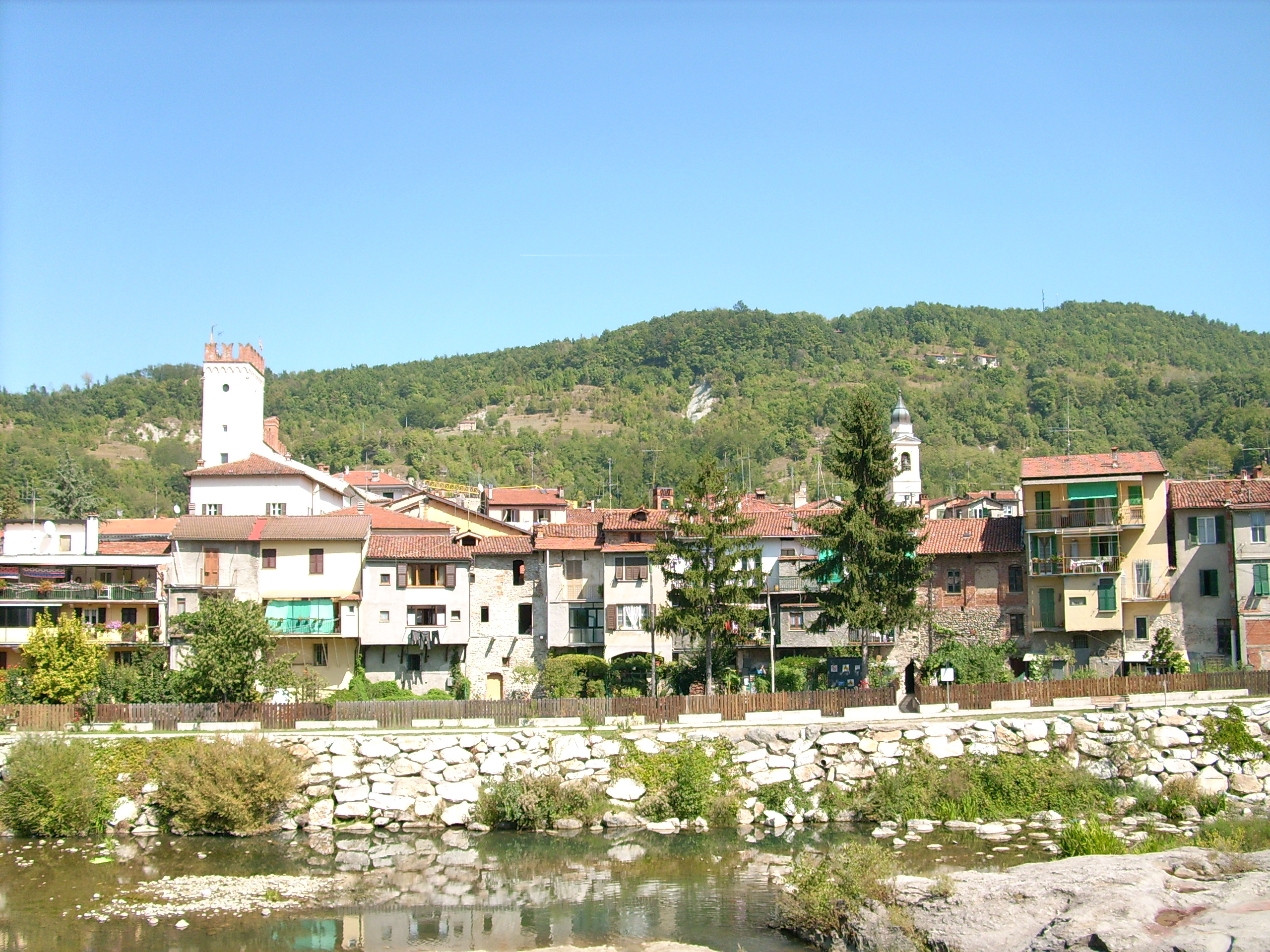
- Millesimo

- Coat of arms

- Location within Italy Location within Liguria
- Coordinates: 44°22′N 8°12′E
- Country: Italy
- Region: Liguria
- Province: Savona (SV)
- Frazioni: Acquafredda, Borda

Government
  - Mayor: Pietro Pizzorno

Area
  - Total: 15.9 km^{2} (6.1 sq mi)
- Elevation: 451 m (1,480 ft)

Population (31 December 2011)
  - Total: 3,446
  - Density: 217/km^{2} (561/sq mi)
- Demonym: Millesimesi
- Time zone: UTC+1 (CET)
  - Summer (DST): UTC+2 (CEST)
- Postal code: 17017
- Dialing code: 019

Millesimo (Ligurian: Millëximo or Merexo, locally Merezu or Mresciu, Piedmontese: Mresù) is a comune (municipality) in the Province of Savona in the Italian region Liguria, located about 60 kilometres (37 mi) west of Genoa and about 25 kilometres (16 mi) northwest of Savona.

Millesimo borders the following municipalities: Cengio, Cosseria, Murialdo, Osiglia, Pallare, Plodio, and Roccavignale. It is one of I Borghi più belli d'Italia ("The most beautiful villages of Italy").

== See also ==
- Battle of Millesimo
