= Osiglia =

- Comune
- Comune di Osiglia
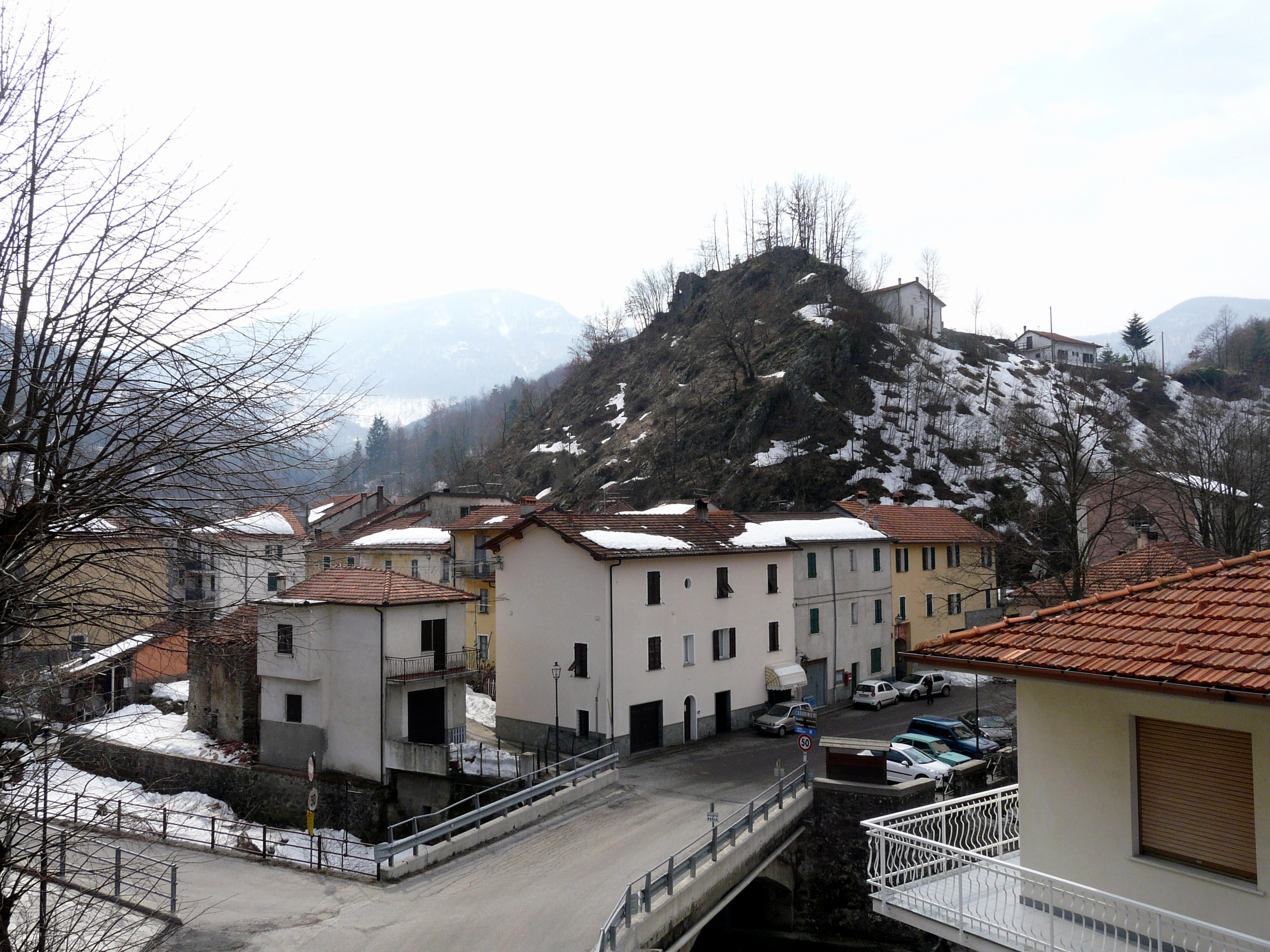
- Osiglia

- Location within Italy Location within Liguria
- Coordinates: 44°17′N 8°12′E
- Country: Italy
- Region: Liguria
- Province: Savona (SV)
- Frazioni: Barberis, Cavallotti, Giacchini, Monte, Orticeti, Ponzi, Ronchi

Government
  - Mayor: Angelo Navoni

Area
  - Total: 28.17 km^{2} (10.88 sq mi)
- Elevation: 715 m (2,346 ft)

Population (31 December 2017)
  - Total: 464
  - Density: 16.5/km^{2} (42.7/sq mi)
- Demonym: Osigliesi
- Time zone: UTC+1 (CET)
  - Summer (DST): UTC+2 (CEST)
- Postal code: 17010
- Dialing code: 019
- Website: Official website

Osiglia (Ligurian and Piedmontese: Oseria) is a comune (municipality) in the Province of Savona in the Italian region Liguria, located about 60 kilometres (37 mi) west of Genoa and about 25 kilometres (16 mi) west of Savona.

Osiglia borders the following municipalities: Bormida, Calizzano, Millesimo, Murialdo, Pallare, and Rialto.

== Population ==
Historical population
Year	Pop.	±%
1981	572	—
1991	504	−11.9%
2001	470	−6.7%
2011	469	−0.2%
2021	443	−5.5%
2024	435	−1.8%

== See also ==
- Monte Camulera
