= Plodio =

- Comune
- Comune di Plodio
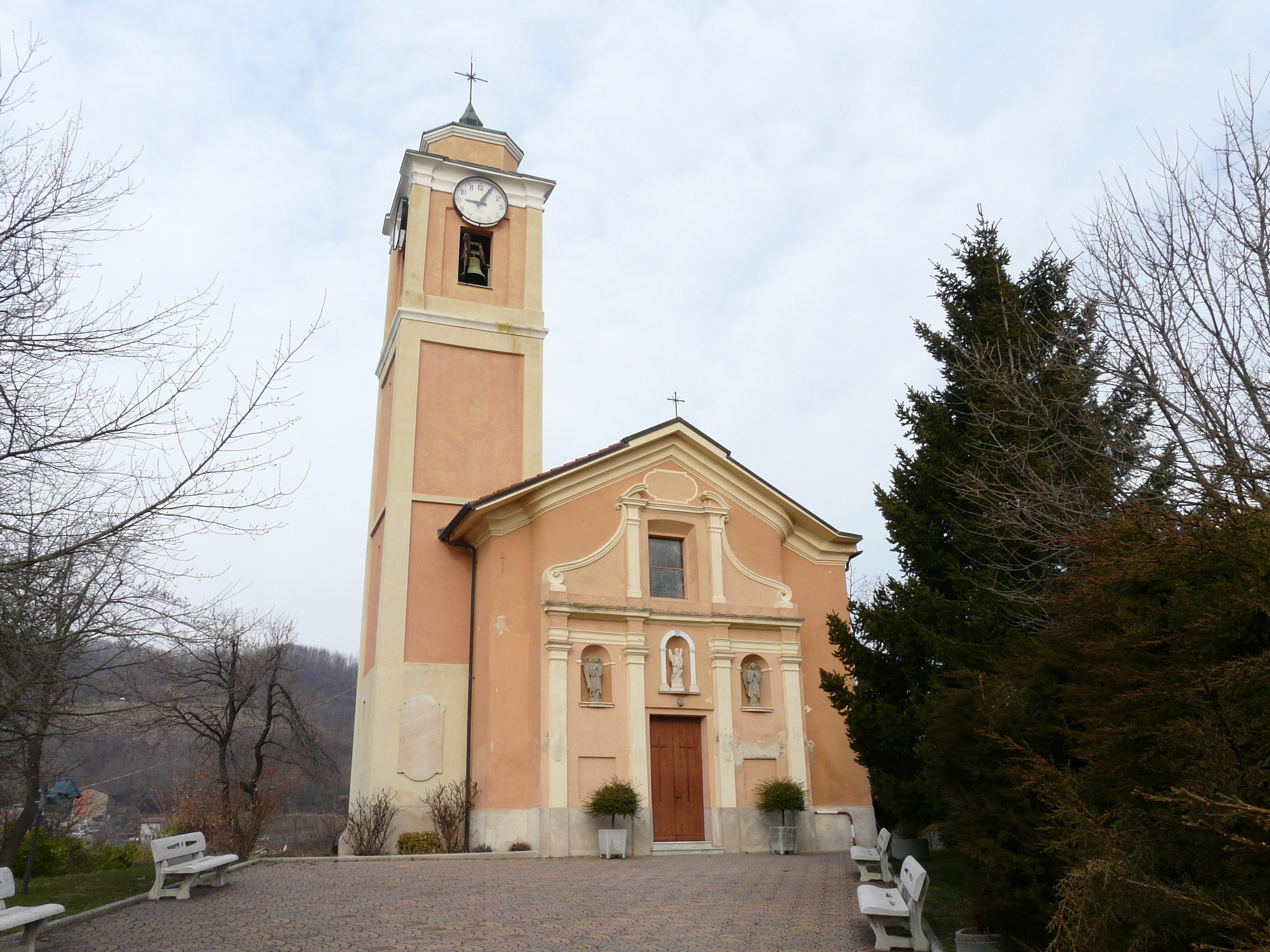
- Saint Andrew Church

- Coat of arms

- Location within Italy Location within Liguria
- Coordinates: 44°21′N 8°15′E
- Country: Italy
- Region: Liguria
- Province: Savona (SV)
- Frazioni: Piani

Government
  - Mayor: Gabriele Badano

Area
  - Total: 8.65 km^{2} (3.34 sq mi)
- Elevation: 498 m (1,634 ft)

Population (31 December 2015)
  - Total: 626
  - Density: 72.4/km^{2} (187/sq mi)
- Demonym: Plodiesi
- Time zone: UTC+1 (CET)
  - Summer (DST): UTC+2 (CEST)
- Postal code: 17043
- Dialing code: 019
- Website: Official website

Plodio (Ligurian: Ciòi; Piedmontese: Ploj) is a comune (municipality) in the Province of Savona in the Italian region Liguria, located about 50 kilometres (31 mi) west of Genoa and about 20 kilometres (12 mi) northwest of Savona. It is in the Val Bormida near the Col di Cadibona.
