= List of municipalities of the Province of Savona =

The following is a list of the 69 municipalities (comuni) of the Province of Savona in the region of Liguria in Italy.

== List ==
Municipality	Population (2026)	Area (km²)	Density
Alassio	9,905	17.25	574.2
Albenga	23,670	36.58	647.1
Albisola Superiore	9,471	28.68	330.2
Albissola Marina	5,125	3.25	1,576.9
Altare	1,922	11.30	170.1
Andora	7,255	31.80	228.1
Arnasco	529	6.09	86.9
Balestrino	522	11.27	46.3
Bardineto	764	29.79	25.6
Bergeggi	1,033	3.69	279.9
Boissano	2,584	8.35	309.5
Borghetto Santo Spirito	4,549	5.39	844.0
Borgio Verezzi	2,081	2.73	762.3
Bormida	306	22.47	13.6
Cairo Montenotte	12,960	100.40	129.1
Calice Ligure	1,674	20.60	81.3
Calizzano	1,457	62.74	23.2
Carcare	5,209	10.40	500.9
Casanova Lerrone	738	24.23	30.5
Castelbianco	319	14.70	21.7
Castelvecchio di Rocca Barbena	133	16.14	8.2
Celle Ligure	4,825	9.56	504.7
Cengio	3,505	18.96	184.9
Ceriale	5,401	11.15	484.4
Cisano sul Neva	2,132	12.27	173.8
Cosseria	1,029	12.41	82.9
Dego	1,826	66.82	27.3
Erli	245	16.73	14.6
Finale Ligure	10,903	35.53	306.9
Garlenda	1,397	8.03	174.0
Giustenice	992	17.22	57.6
Giusvalla	389	19.70	19.7
Laigueglia	1,681	2.72	618.0
Loano	10,710	13.48	794.5
Magliolo	992	19.57	50.7
Mallare	1,017	31.73	32.1
Massimino	102	7.85	13.0
Millesimo	3,334	15.96	208.9
Mioglia	502	19.30	26.0
Murialdo	715	39.22	18.2
Nasino	145	22.18	6.5
Noli	2,373	9.67	245.4
Onzo	209	8.23	25.4
Orco Feglino	901	17.31	52.1
Ortovero	1,689	9.66	174.8
Osiglia	401	28.17	14.2
Pallare	867	21.33	40.6
Piana Crixia	749	30.45	24.6
Pietra Ligure	8,224	9.88	832.4
Plodio	616	8.65	71.2
Pontinvrea	807	24.95	32.3
Quiliano	6,818	49.92	136.6
Rialto	526	19.60	26.8
Roccavignale	755	17.71	42.6
Sassello	1,700	100.66	16.9
Savona	58,421	65.32	894.4
Spotorno	3,314	8.02	413.2
Stella	2,945	43.68	67.4
Stellanello	806	17.81	45.3
Testico	173	10.29	16.8
Toirano	2,724	18.97	143.6
Tovo San Giacomo	2,507	9.45	265.3
Urbe	651	31.17	20.9
Vado Ligure	7,967	23.79	334.9
Varazze	12,409	48.00	258.5
Vendone	343	9.92	34.6
Vezzi Portio	795	8.76	90.8
Villanova d'Albenga	2,888	15.89	181.7
Zuccarello	284	10.81	26.3

== See also ==
- List of municipalities of Liguria
- List of municipalities of Italy
