= Antonio Brilla =

Italian sculptor

- Born: 22 September 1813; Savona
- Died: 8 February 1891 (aged 77); Savona
- Known for: Sculpture

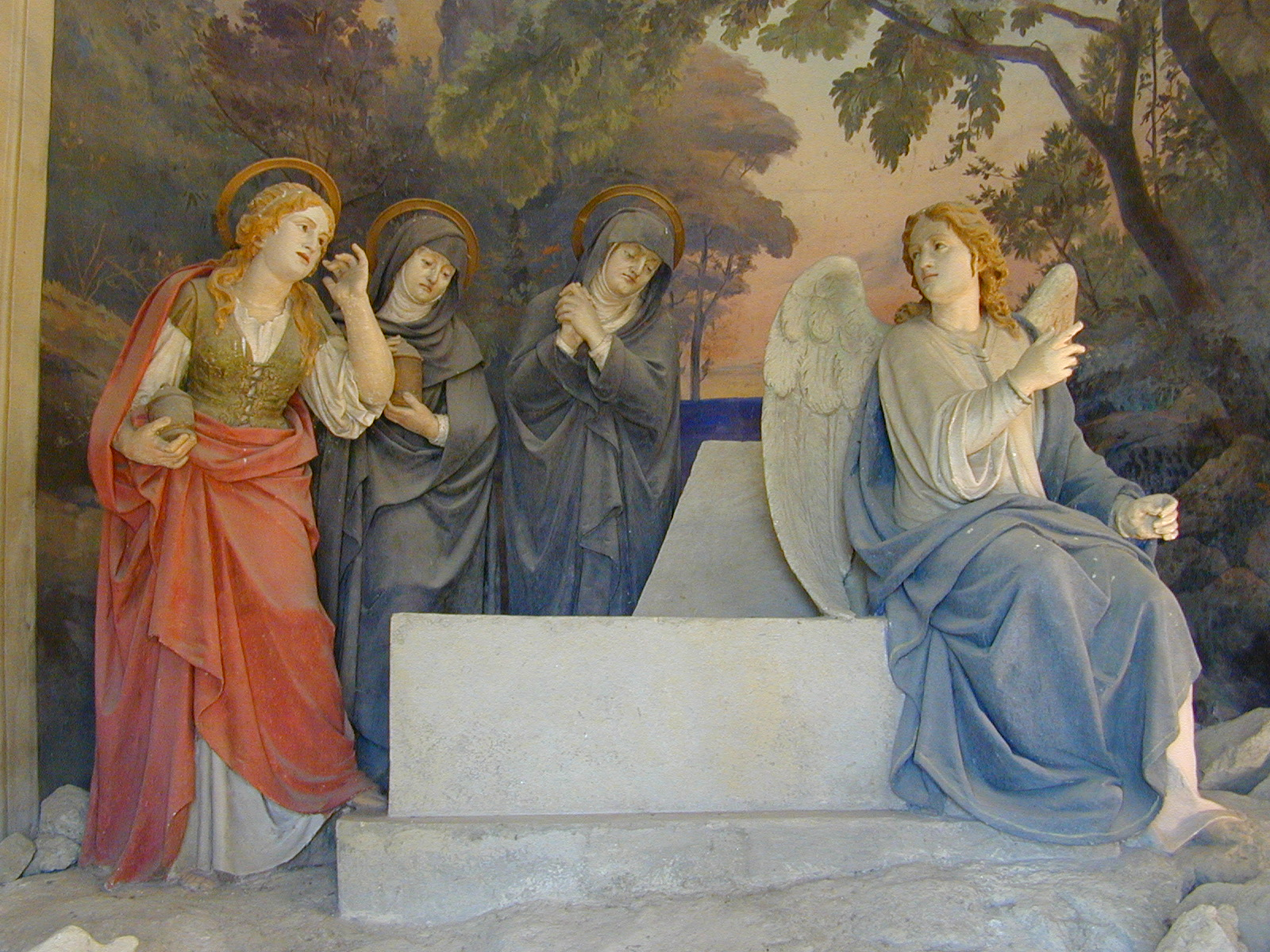
The finding of the empty tomb of Christ at Sacro Monte di Crea

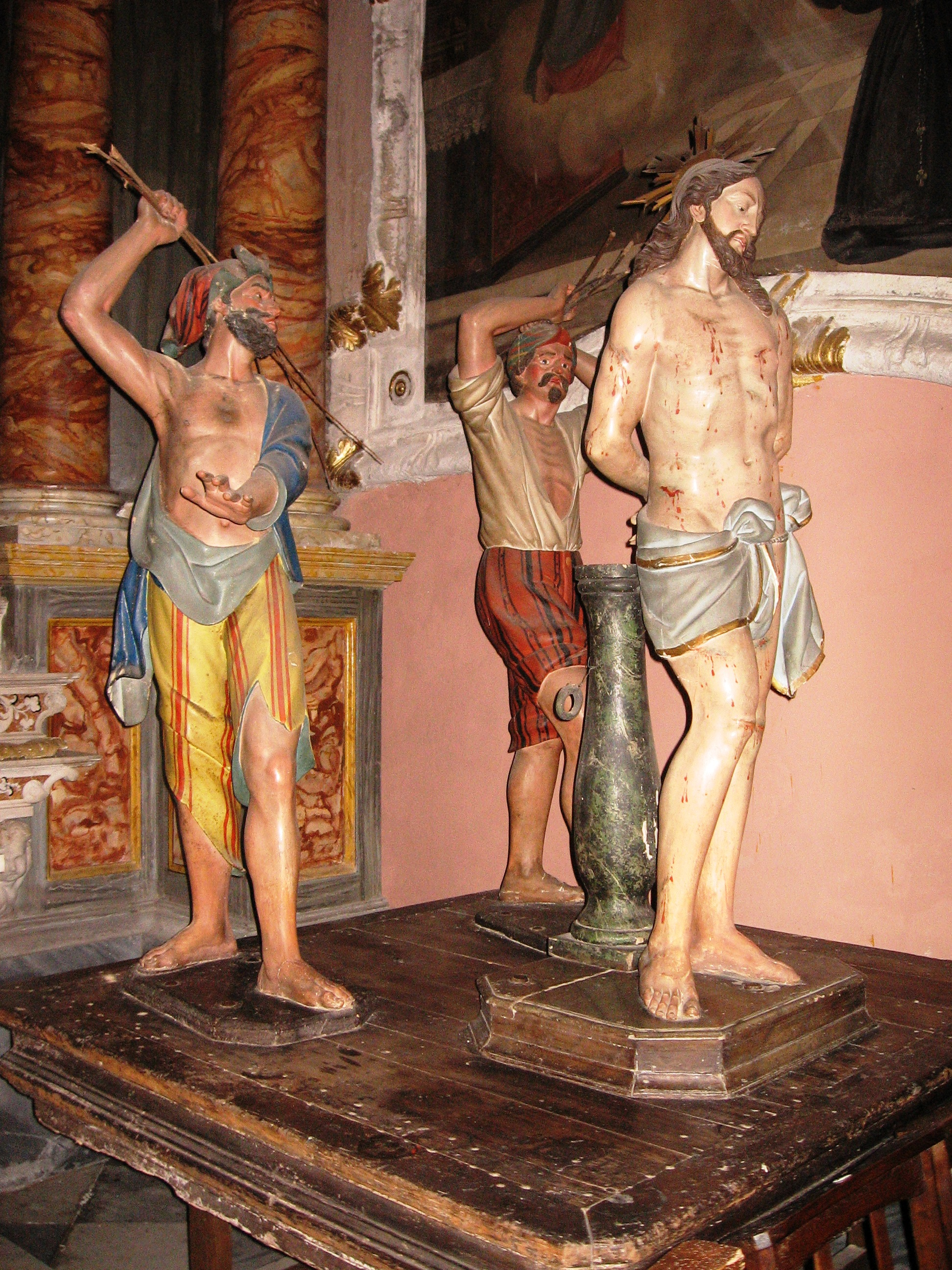
Flagellation of Christ

Antonio Brilla (22 September 1813 in Savona – 8 February 1891 in Savona) was a prolific Italian sculptor and ceramic artist mainly active in Liguria. He travelled in 1838 to Florence to study masterworks, where he met Giovanni Duprè and Lorenzo Bartolini. He returned to Savona to establish a studio. Two of Antonio's sons also were artists.

== Works ==
- Madonna della Misericordia for the Sanctuary of Nostra Signora sul Monte Gazzo, Sestri Ponente.
- Bas relief of poet Chiabrera, statues of Gioacchino Rossini and Pietro Metastasio for the facade of the Teatro Chiabrera of Savona.
- Statue of Madonna in sacristy for the Church of Sant'Andrea Apostolo (Savona).
- Crucifix and facade statues (1890) for the Oratory of Saints John the Baptist, John the Evangelist, and Petronilla in Savona.
- Wooden statuary (1858) depicting Assumption of the Virgin for the Church of San Nicolò in Pietra Ligure.
- Processional tableaux (1878) of Miracles of San Nicolò for the Parochial church of San Nicolò of Pietra Ligure.
- Processional tableaux (1861) with figures of Grieving Madonna for the Oratory of the Santissimi Concezione of Pietra Ligure.
- Facade cement statues of Saints Peter, Paul, and San Nicolò with angels for the Parochial Church of San Nicolò a Pietra Ligure.
- Statues (1858–1877) of Doctors of the Church and Evangelists for the Parochial Church of San Nicolò in Pietra Ligure.
- Statues of Bartholomew the Apostle and Margaret the Virgin for the Church of Lusignano;
- Processional tableaux with figures of Madonna, St. Anne and Joachim for the Oratory of Sant'Anna of Spotorno.
- Statue of St. John the Baptist (facade) and Virtue (interior) for the Collegiata di San Giovanni Battista in Finale Ligure.
- Processional tableaux (1866) for Deposition for the Oratory of the Resurrected Christ in Savona.
- Statuary of The finding of the empty tomb of Christ for Sacro Monte di Crea.
- Bas relief of St. Lawrence for the Oratory of San Lorenzo in Cogoleto.
- Facade statues of David and Isaiah for the Church of Santa Anna a Teglia in Genoa-Rivarolo.
- Crucifix and wood statuary of St. Anthony for the Church of San Dalmazio in Lavagnola (Savona).
- Processional house of St. Rocco for the Parochial Church of Stella San Giovanni.
- Statue of St. Martin for the Parochial Church of Stella San Martino.
- Sixth station of the Via Crucis (copy) for the Parochial Church of Stella San Bernardo.
- Wooden Statue of Saint Catherine of Alessandria for the Parochial Church of Stella Gameragna.
- Terracotta Nativity for the Parochial Church of Celle Ligure (completed 1860–1880).
- Statue for the Basilica of Santa Maria Assunta, Genoa.
- Statue for the Church of San Lorenzo in Cairo Montenotte.
- Crucifix for the Church of the Visitation in Sassello.
- Wooden Statues (1843) of Madonna of the Rosary and St. Anthony of Padua for the Church of San Giacomo il Maggiore in Urbe.
- Statue for the Sanctuary of Madonna della Pace (Albisola Superiore).
- Processional Crucifix for the Oratory of San Michele Arcangelo in Celle Ligure.
- Statuary in plaster of Saint Isidore and others for the Oratory of Santa Maria Maggiore in Albisola Superiore.
- Statue for the Church of San Giovanni Battista in Carcare.
- Polychrome wood tableau (1836–7) of Flagellation of Christ for the Parochial Church of San Michele Arcangelo, Cortemilia (Cuneo).
- Statuary of Crucifixion Scene for the Church of San Francesco d'Albaro in Genoa.
- Busts of Benefactors for Hospital San Paolo in Savona.

== Sources ==
- Entry in Treccani Enciclopedia Italiana
