= Paolo Gerolamo Brusco =

Italian painter

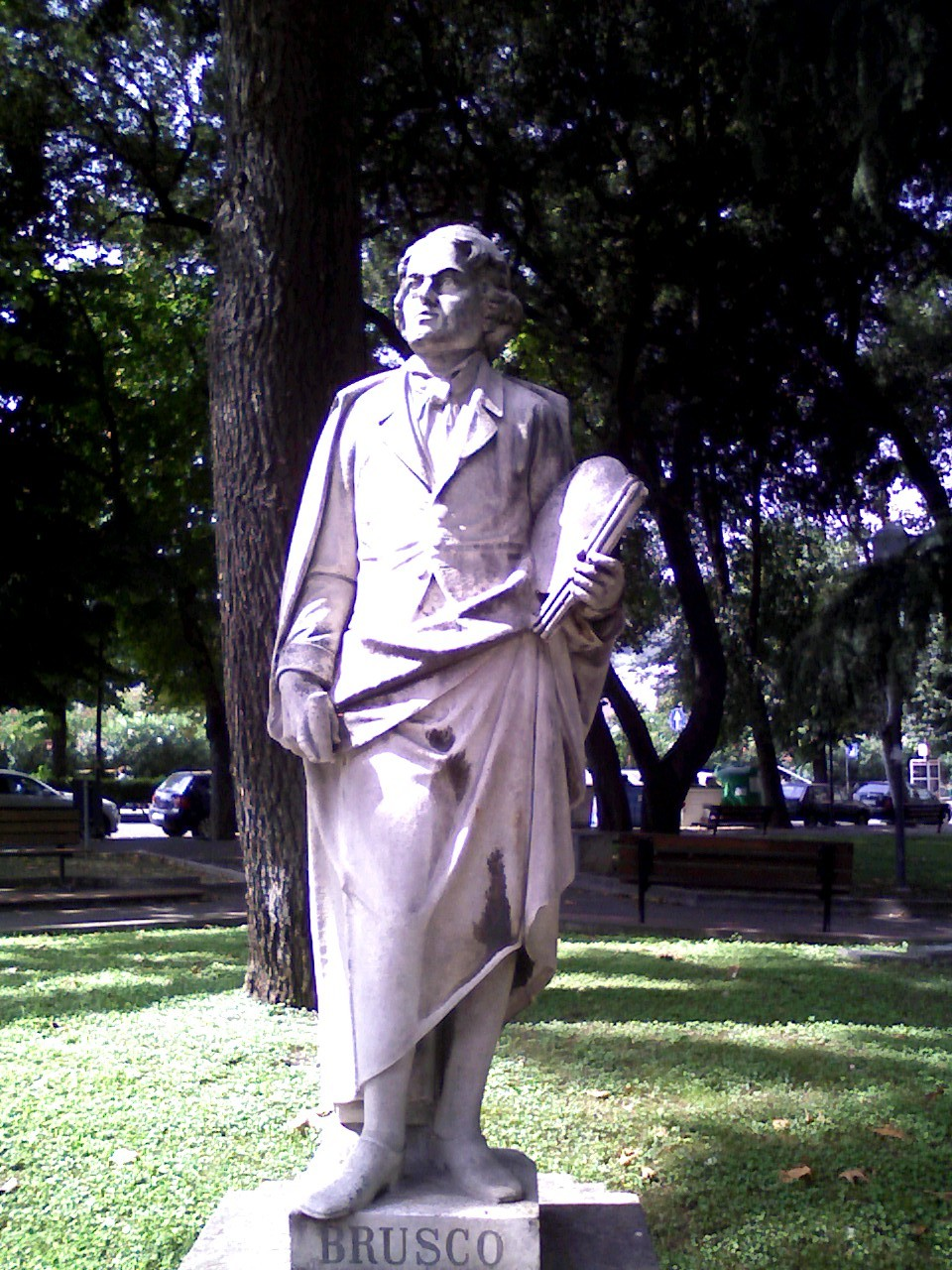
- Statue of Paolo Gerolamo Brusco in the public gardens of the Piazza del Popolo in Savona.
- Born: 8 June 1742; Savona
- Died: 30 March 1820 (aged 77)
- Known for: Painting
- Movement: Neoclassic

Paolo Gerolamo Brusco or Girolamo Brusco (8 June 1742 – 30 March 1820) was a prolific Italian painter active in Liguria. He was also nicknamed Bruschetto.

== Biography ==
Born in Savona, his father and one of his brothers were employed in painting local maiolica. Another brother, Giacomo, was a civil engineer. As a young man, he traveled to Rome and was influenced by the Neoclassic style of Anton Raphael Mengs, and may have trained with Pompeo Batoni

== Works ==
- St Vincent of Paoli in the first chapel to right of the Church of Sant'Andrea Apostolo (Savona).
- Stuccowork and frescoes for the Church of San Pietro (Savona).
- Mysteries of the Rosary: Canvases for the Church of San Bernardo of Stella.
- Frescoes in the presbytery for the Church of San Lorenzo of Cairo Montenotte.
- Fresco (1810) of St. Martin for the Church of San Martino of Italy.
- Frescoes for the Church of Santissima Trinità in Sassello.
- Frescoes for the Church of San Michele in Celle Ligure.
- Canvases and frescoes for the Church of San Nicolò in Albisola Superiore.
- Canvases for the Church of San Giovanni Battista of Savona.
- Frescoes for the Sanctuary of Nostra Signora delle Grazie al Molo in Genoa.
- Madonna di Misericordia for the Oratory of Nostra Signora di Castello in Savona.

== Sources ==
- Treccani Enciclopedia Dizionario biografico.
