= Montenotte (department) =

Former French department in Italy (1805–1814)

Département de Montenotte
- department of the First French Empire
- 1805–1815
- Location of Montenotte in France (1812)
- Capital: Savona
- Area
  - Coordinates: 44°18′N 8°29′E
  - 1810: 3,937.98 km^{2} (1,520.46 sq mi)
- Population
  - 1810: 289,823
- History
  - Annexion from the Ligurian Republic: 4 June 1805
  - Congress of Vienna: 1815
- Political subdivisions: 4 Arrondissements
Preceded by	Succeeded by
Ligurian Republic	Kingdom of Sardinia

Montenotte (French: [mɔ̃.tə.nɔt]) was a department of the First French Empire in present-day Italy. It was named after the Battle of Montenotte, a 1796 French victory over the Austrians near Cairo Montenotte, near Savona. It was formed in 1805, when the Ligurian Republic (formerly the Republic of Genoa) was annexed directly to France. Its capital was Savona.

The department was disbanded after the defeat of Napoleon in 1814. It was followed by a brief restoration of the Ligurian Republic, but at the Congress of Vienna the old territory of Genoa was awarded to the Kingdom of Sardinia. Its territory is now divided between the Italian provinces of Savona, Alessandria, Imperia and Cuneo.

== Subdivision ==
Coat of arms of the city of Savona under the French Empire

The department was subdivided into the following arrondissements and cantons (situation in 1812):

- Savona, cantons: Cairo, Finale, Pietra, Noli, Quiliano, Sassello, Savona and Varazze.
- Acqui, cantons: Acqui, Castelletto d'Orba, Dego, Incisa, Nizza Monferrato, Santo Stefano Belbo, Spigno and Visone.
- Ceva, cantons: Calizzano, Ceva, Dogliani, Garessio, Millesimo, Murazzano, Ormea and Saliceto.
- Porto Maurizio, cantons: Alassio, Albenga, Borgomaro, Diano Marina, Oneglia, Pieve di Teco, Porto Maurizio and Santo Stefano.

Its population in 1812 was 289,823, and its area was 393,798 hectares.
