= Cairo Montenotte =

- Comune
- Città di Cairo Montenotte
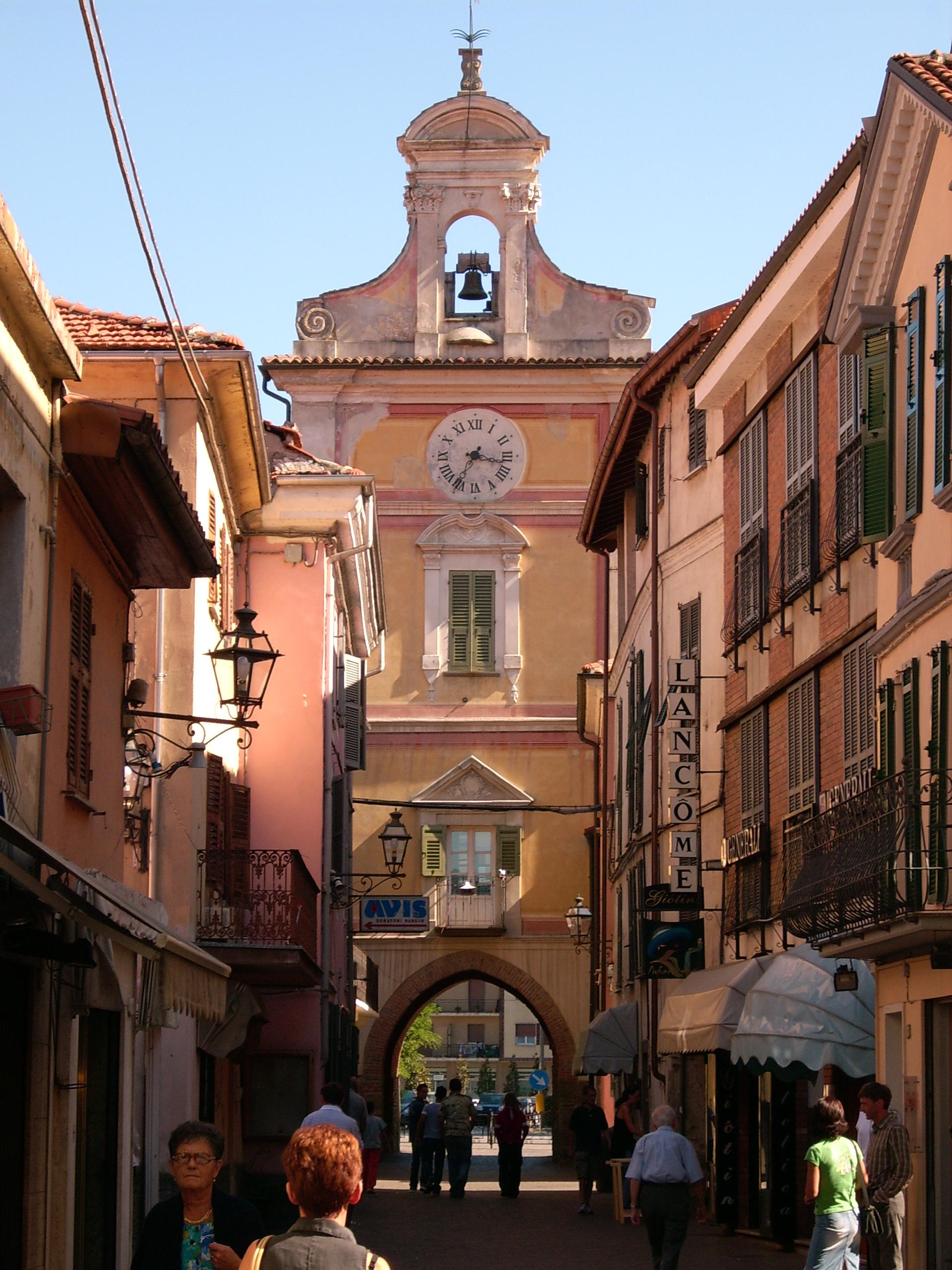
- Cairo Montenotte - Porta Soprana

- Flag Coat of arms

- Location within Italy Location within Liguria
- Coordinates: 44°24′N 8°16′E
- Country: Italy
- Region: Liguria
- Province: Savona (SV)
- Frazioni: Rocchetta di Cairo, Carretto, Bragno, Ferrania, San Giuseppe di Cairo, Ville, Chinelli, Bellini

Government
  - Mayor: Paolo Lambertini

Area
  - Total: 99.5 km^{2} (38.4 sq mi)
- Elevation: 330 m (1,080 ft)

Population (1 January 2021)
  - Total: 12,691
  - Density: 128/km^{2} (330/sq mi)
- Demonym: Cairesi
- Time zone: UTC+1 (CET)
  - Summer (DST): UTC+2 (CEST)
- Postal code: 17014
- Dialing code: 019
- ISTAT code: 009015
- Patron saint: Saint Lawrence
- Saint day: 10 August
- Website: Official website

Cairo Montenotte (Ligurian: Coiri) is a comune (municipality) in the Province of Savona in Liguria, an Italian region located 50 kilometres (31 mi) west of Genoa and 20 kilometres (12 mi) northwest of Savona. Located in Val Bormida, it is a member of the Comunità Montana Alta Val Bormida. It is considered to be the main centre of Val Bormida and it has 12691 inhabitants. It is the fourth municipality in the province together with Savona, Albenga and Varazze, as well as the most popular municipality in Liguria among those without outlet on the sea. The municipal area is the biggest in the province behind Sassello, and the fifth in Liguria.

In 2007, Cairo Montenotte drew up a project of collaboration with other municipalities of Val Bormida through the formulation of the so-called ‘Piano Strategico delle Città delle Bormide’, focusing on establishing the area within the Ligurian socio-economic context in a more effective way.

It is known for being the birthplace of the patriot Giuseppe Cesare Abba.

Cairo Montenotte borders the following municipalities: Albisola Superiore, Altare, Carcare, Cengio, Cosseria, Dego, Giusvalla, Gottasecca, Pontinvrea, Saliceto, and Savona.

== Geography ==
Cairo Montenotte is situated in the high part of Val Bormida, more precisely in the countryside behind Savona, and it is the biggest and most important town of Val Bormida.

The urban area reaches an average height of 340 m a.s.l., and it expands in the valley floor along the left shore of Spigno’s Bormida River. Bric del Tesoro is the highest peak of the town district, with a height of 860 m a.s.l.

== History ==
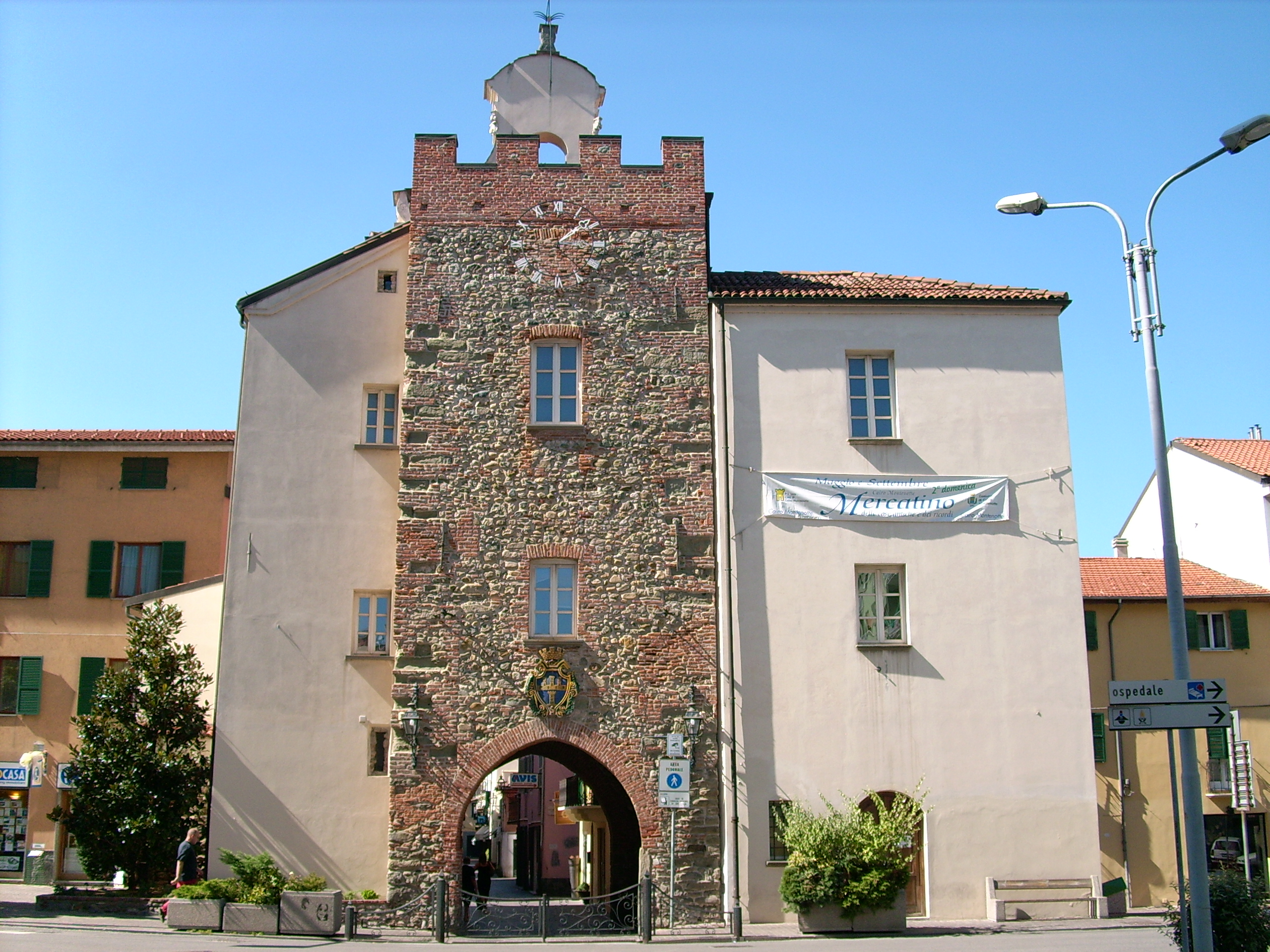
Porta Soprana - Ancient gateway to the historic centre

The name "Cairo" comes from the Latin "carium", which itself comes from the ancient Ligurian stem "car-", meaning "stone" or "rock".

According to many archeological finds, this area has been inhabited since the Neolithic age. In fact, arrowheads, spears, daggers and axes are stored in Calasanzio Institute in Genoa Cornigliano, and a polished stone axe is kept in the Ligurian Archeological Museum in Genoa Pegli.

Probably before the Roman Conquest, Cairo was inhabited by the Ligurian Statielli.

After the Roman Conquest of the Ligurian territory, the Bormida Valley was crossed by the Via Aemilia Scauri, commissioned by the censor Marco Emilio Scauro in 109 BC, that connected the city of Derthona (Tortona) and Vada Sabatia (Vado Ligure), and in Cairo there was the station of Canalicum or Calanico. The road network was enlarged with the building of Via Julia Augusta, commissioned by Augusto in 13 BC in order to assure the connection with the Gallic provinces.

In the exact place where today stands Nostra Signora delle Grazie Church, there have been found several Roman artefacts and remains of an ancient rustic villa (farm) from the Imperial period.

Since the Lombard period, the local area was included in the San Colombano di Bobbio (PC) Abbey domains through the San Salvatore di Giusvalla Abbey control, directly dependent upon the Holy See. Together with many other territories, this area was included in the royal, imperial and monastic feud.

The toponym ‘Carium’ made an appearance for the first time in a document from 967 AD, in which the Emperor Ottone I di Sassonia decided to offer to Aleramo several territories already devastated by Lombard and Saracen past incursions.

The 8 May 1080, Cairo inhabitants signed a pact of friendship with Savonesi, people coming from Savona, signed again in 1120, 1188, 1194, as documents from 998 and 1014 state. In 1091 Cairo was hold by Bonifacio del Vasto who will later divest some lands to Ferrania's Abbey, that was built in 1097. A bull from Pope Innocent II dated 20 February 1141, cites Cairo's castle, that has been placed under the protection of the Holy See together with the Saint Eugine Benedictine Abbey of Bergeggi Island. From 1131 until 1191 it was part of Marca di Savona.

A popular legend reports that Francis of Assisi crossed the town in 1213, when he was travelling towards Spain, but it has not been proved by any written document. On 5 July 1214, Ottone Del Carretto, lord of Savona, sold Cairo's castle to Genoa together with its annexed lands. On July 16, Ottone was elected feudal lord of Cairo, Carretto, Vigneroli and half of Carcare, by Genoa consuls. On 5 November 1235, the family bought Rocchetta di Cairo's castle from Cavalieri Ospitalieri di San Giovanni (then Cavalieri di Malta).

In 1332, the territories that belonged to Del Carretto's family passed to Manfred IV of Saluzzo, Saluzzo marquis, then sold to Scarampi brothers on 8 February 1337 (or in 1339), which were rich bankers and merchants from Asti. The latter ones were initially Genoa feudal lords (9 July 1419), and then they became lords of the March of Montferrat with the reunion of the two principal feuds.

In the 16th century, Cairo was involved in the wars between imperial and French troupes until the peace in 1599. In 1625 and 1637, the village was attacked and sacked by the Duchy of Savoy army that was at war with Genoa, causing a severe drought. On 5 October 1735 the vast majority of Cairo's territories went under the Kingdom of Sardinia domain, and with the Treaty of Vienna on 30 August 1736 the whole lands were ceded.

In 1796, the first successful battle of the Italian Campaign by Napoleon, known as the Battle of Montenotte, took place in Cairo, more precisely in Montenotte Superiore. Thereafter, a district of the Irish town Cork was named after this battle.

With the French domination, on 2 December 1797 Cairo was established as a municipality entering the Letimbro Department, with Savona as a chief town, as part of the Ligurian Republic. On 28 April 1798, it was inserted in the I canton of the Colombo Jurisdiction, and from 1803 it became the main centre of the I canton in Savona under the Colombo Jurisdiction. Being annexed to the First French Empire, from 13 June 1805 to 1814 it was included in Montenotte Department. On 19 March 1814 Pope Pius VII crossed the village.

In 1815, it was included in the Kingdom of Sardinia as the Vienna Congress established in 1814, and in 1861 it was annexed to the Kingdom of Italy. From 1859 to 1927, the area was included in the 4th district of the surrounding area of Savona that was part of the province of Genoa. In 1927 the whole territory went under the newly established Province of Savona.

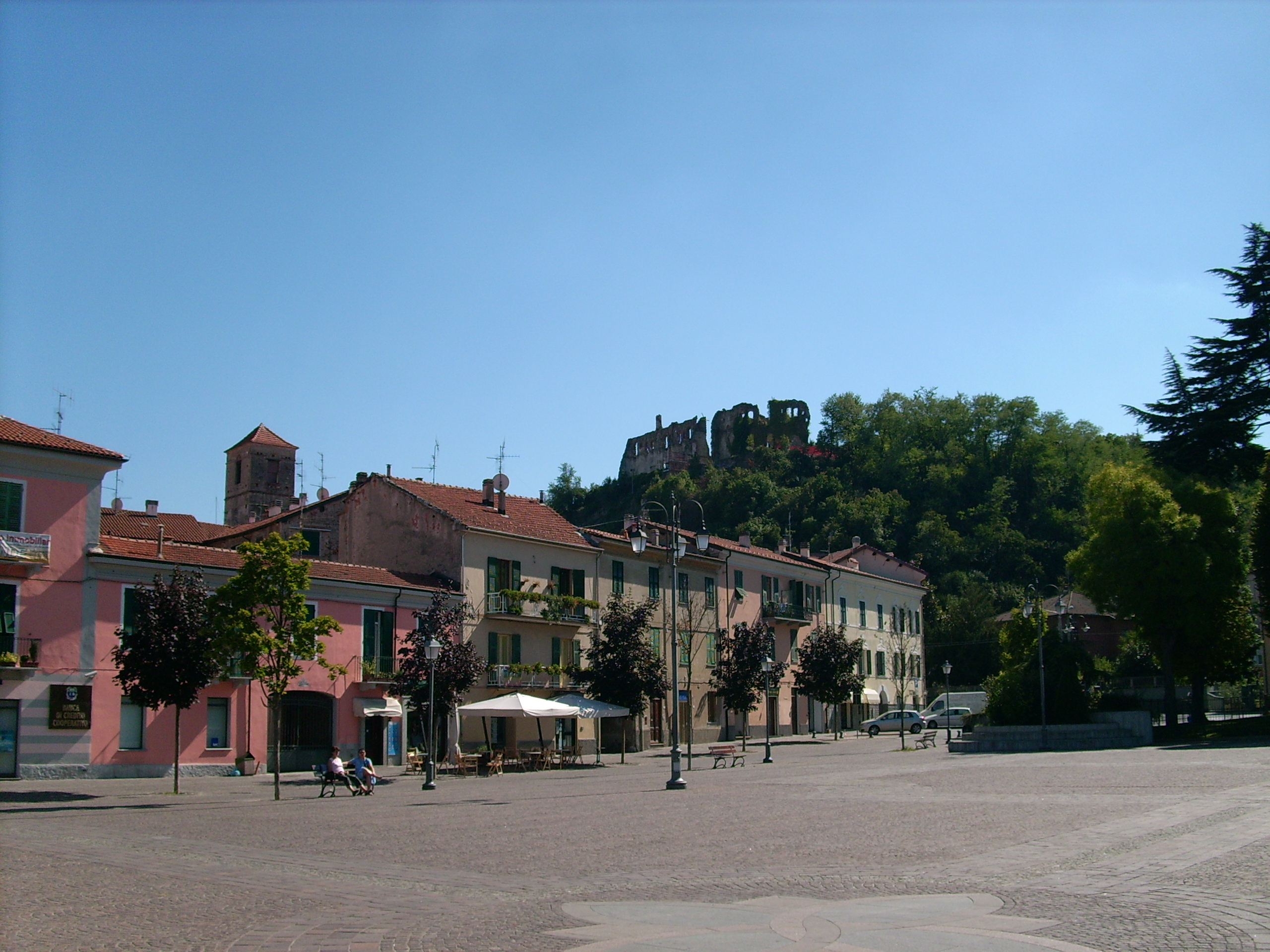
The ruins of the Castle of Cairo Montenotte

King Victor Emmanuel II authorised Cairo to gain the name Cairo Montenotte, with a royal decree dated 8 April 1863, in memory of the battle of 11 and 12 April 1796. In 1880 the two municipalities of Carretto and Rocchetta di Cairo were suppressed and included in the municipality of Cairo Montenotte. In December 1916, the Defence Section of Cairo Montenotte was born and activated in January 1917 with three Voisin III. In the summer of 1918, it became the 305th Section, that remained until February 1919.

In 1929, Cairo Montenotte underwent the last territorial adjustment when the village of Monti was integrated to it, after the suppression of the municipalities of Santa Giulia and Brovida included in the one of Dego.

The 7 January 1956 the village obtained the title of ‘Città’ (city), thanks to the Decree of the President of the Italian Republic that was Giovanni Gronchi.

The post-war period was successful for the economic and urban development, enough to make it one of the most important industrial centres in the province and region.

From 1973 to 2008 it was part of the Comunità Montana Alta Val Bormida (suppressed in 2011).

== Cityscape ==
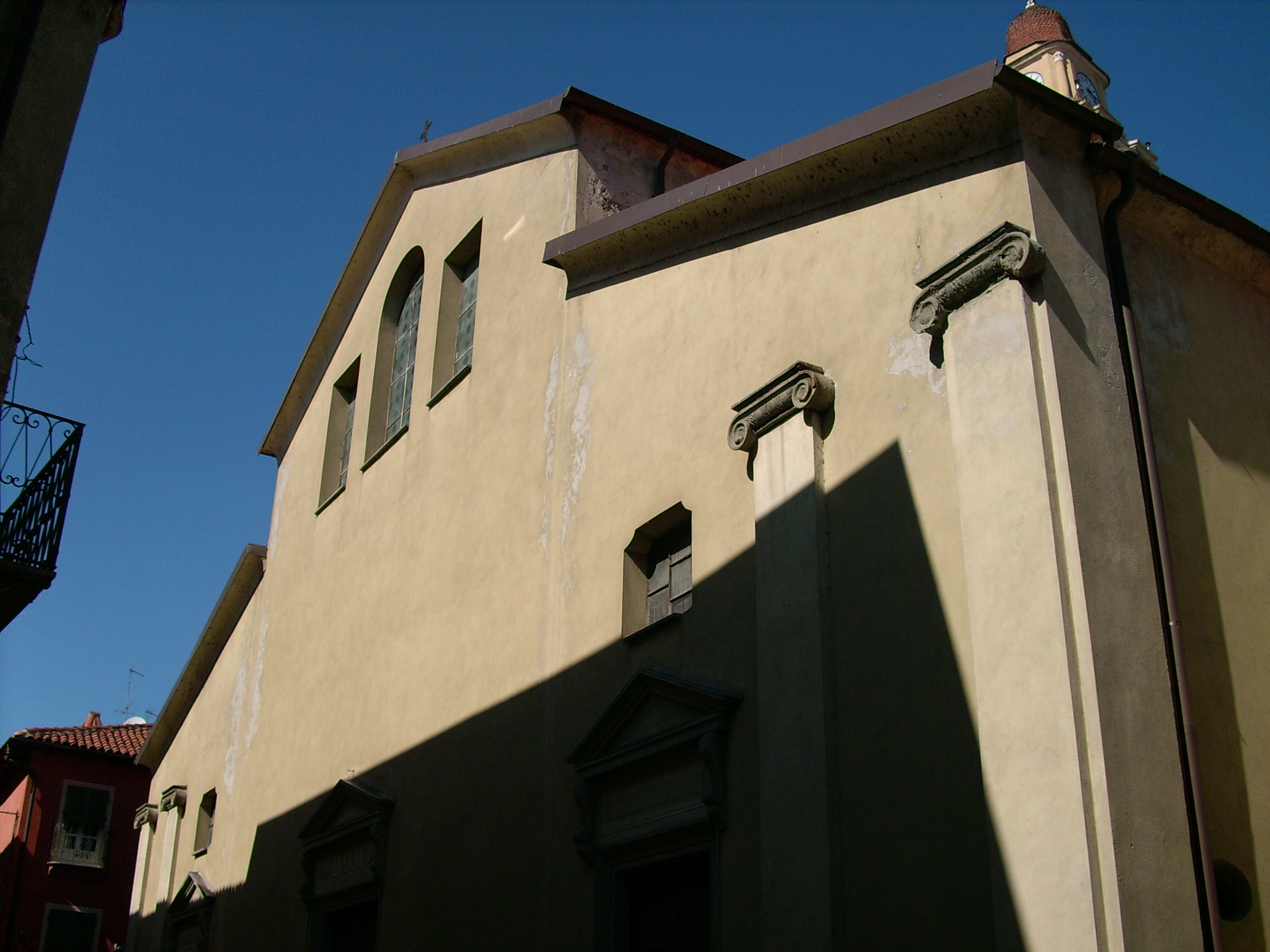
Parish Church of Saint Lawrence

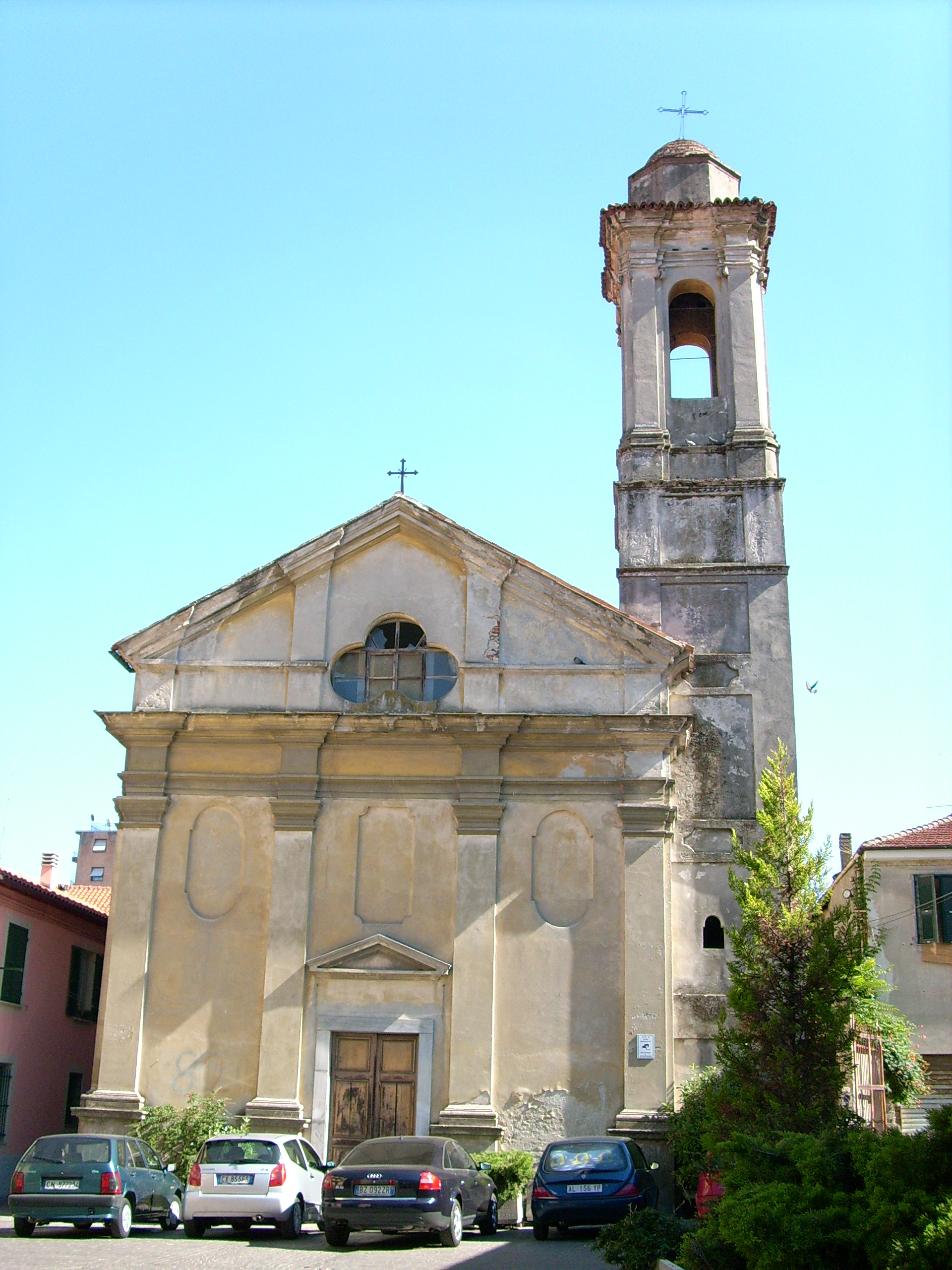
Ex Oratory of Saint Sebastian

=== Churches ===
- Parish Church of Saint Lawrence in the town centre of Cairo Montenotte. It was first mentioned on 4 May 1190. It was expanded after the plague in 1630 and it was fully finished in 1642. In the inside there are some frescos by Paolo Gerolamo Brusco, statues by Antonio Brilla and a crucifix by Anton Maria Maragliano. This church has been declared national monument. Its patron is Our Lady of Sorrows.
- Ex oratory of Saint Sebastian and its Disciplining, near Porta Piemonte, in the town centre of Cario Montenotte. The only remains of the original structure are the left side wall and that of the apse. There officiated the Order of Friars Minor of the convent of San Francesco and it was the home of the Company of Disciplining or Battuti, also called Confraternity of San Sebastiano, obedient to the rule of San Carlo and custodians of various relics including that of San Teodoro.
- Chapel of Saint Rocco outside the walls of the town, it was built for a vow people from Cairo Montenotte made after the plague in 1599. Inside there is an altar dedicated to Saint Roch and San Gaetano.
- Sanctuary of the Madonna delle Grazie, it was built on the ruins of a pagan temple. Its structures hides the ruins of a cell of San Donato of the Benedictine monks already mentioned in 992, that became a parish church in 1014.
- Parish Church of Cristo Re, Immaculate Heart of Mary and Saint Barbara in Bragno, founded in 1934.
- Chapel of Saint Rocco in Carnovale, built in 1648 above the ruins of a sacred building.
- Parish Church of Saint Martino in the hamlet of Carretto.
- Parish Church of Saint Agata in the hamlet of Chiappella.
- Parish Church of Saint Lazzaro in the hamlet of Colombera.
- Abbey of Ferrania and parish church of Saints Saints Peter and Paul (medieval name Ferranica) is one of the oldest settlements in the area. The structure, located in the suburb of San Pietro, has preserved the original layout, transforming into houses those that were the buildings of the convent.
- Chapel of Saint Michele in the hamlet of Ferrere, built in 1694.
- Chapel of Saint Margherita of Fornaci, it is located on the slope above the quarry of Fornaci.
- Parish Church of Santissimo Nome di Maria in the hamlet of Montenotte Inferiore.
- Chapel of the Nativity of the Virgin Mary in the hamlet of Monti, built in 1913.
- Parish church of Saint Andrew in the hamlet of Rocchetta Cairo.
- Parish church of Saint Joseph, in the hamlet of San Giuseppe di Cairo. It was rebuilt in 1957 after the previous chapel was demolished to make room for the local railway station.
- Chapel of Saint Anna, in the hamlet of Sant'Anna.
- Ex convent of San Francesco in the hamlet of Ville, built in the thirteenth century at the behest of Ottone Del Carretto. It is the most prestigious monument in Cairo Montenotte.
- Church of Saint Matthew in the hamlet of Ville.
- Chapel of the Magdalene, mentioned in a pastoral report of 1577, rebuilt in 1633.
- Chapel of the Madonna del Bosco, built in 1623.
- Church of Santa Maria del Roccaro, called Our Lady of the Visitation in a pastoral visit of 1644, it has been transformed into civil dwellings.
- Jehovah's Witness Assembly Halls.

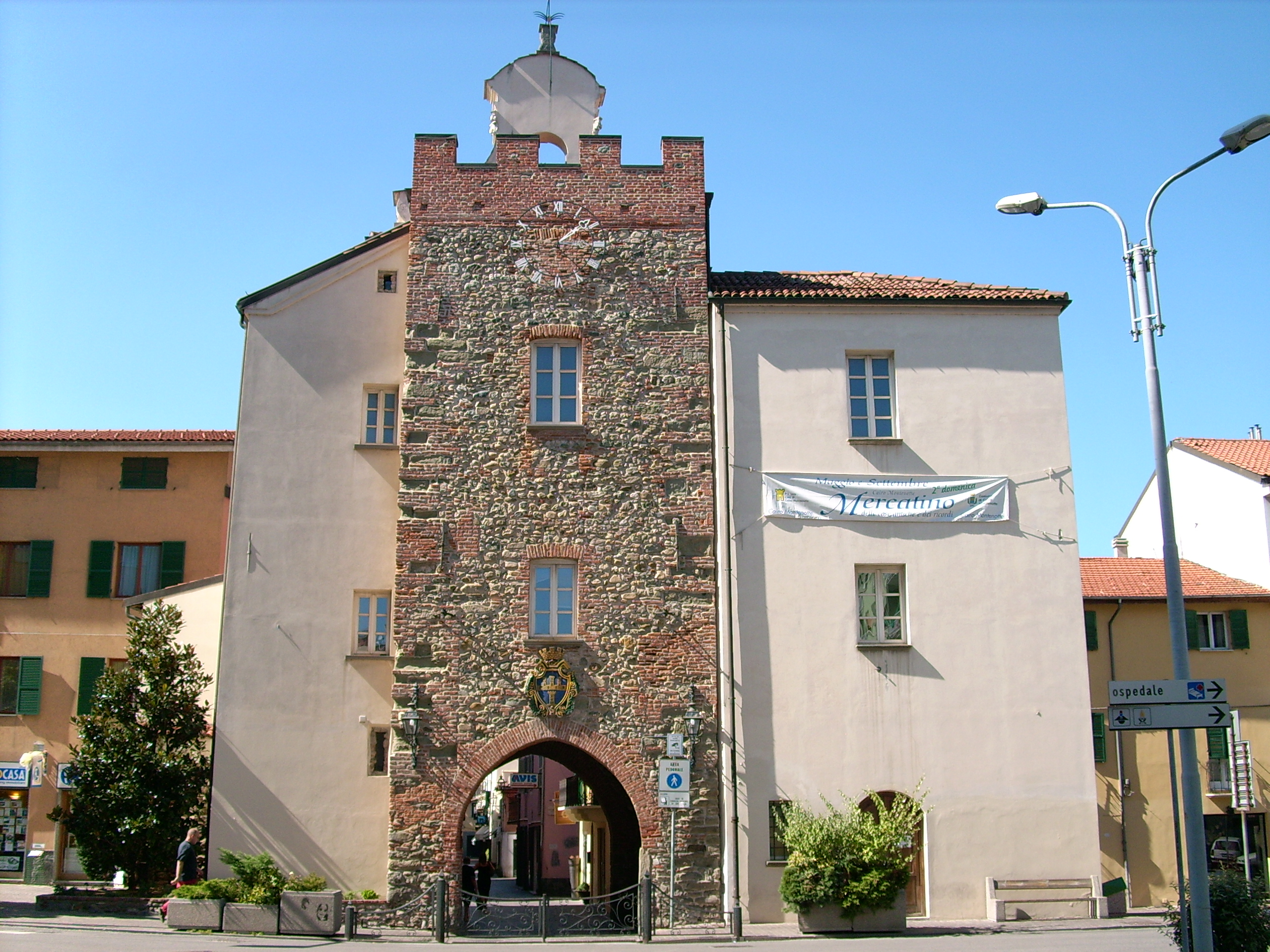
Porta Soprana

=== Buildings and palaces ===
- Scarampi Palace, dated XVII century. After the abandonment of the Castle of Cairo Montenotte in 1637, it became the headquarters of the various feudal lords of the village. Since 1972 part of the premises are occupied by the civic library F.C. Rossi, dated 1958, and by the Ferrania Film Museum, founded in 2017.
- De Mari Palace, formerly Scarampi Palace and Palace of Durazzo family.
- Villa De Mari, dated XVIII, it was built on a project by Carlo Barabino.
- Ponte romano called "degli Alemanni".
- Porta Soprana, in the southern part of the village. It is dated XIV century, and it is composed by a quadrangular tower with a double ogival brick opening.
- Porta Sottana, in the northern part of the village Cairese.

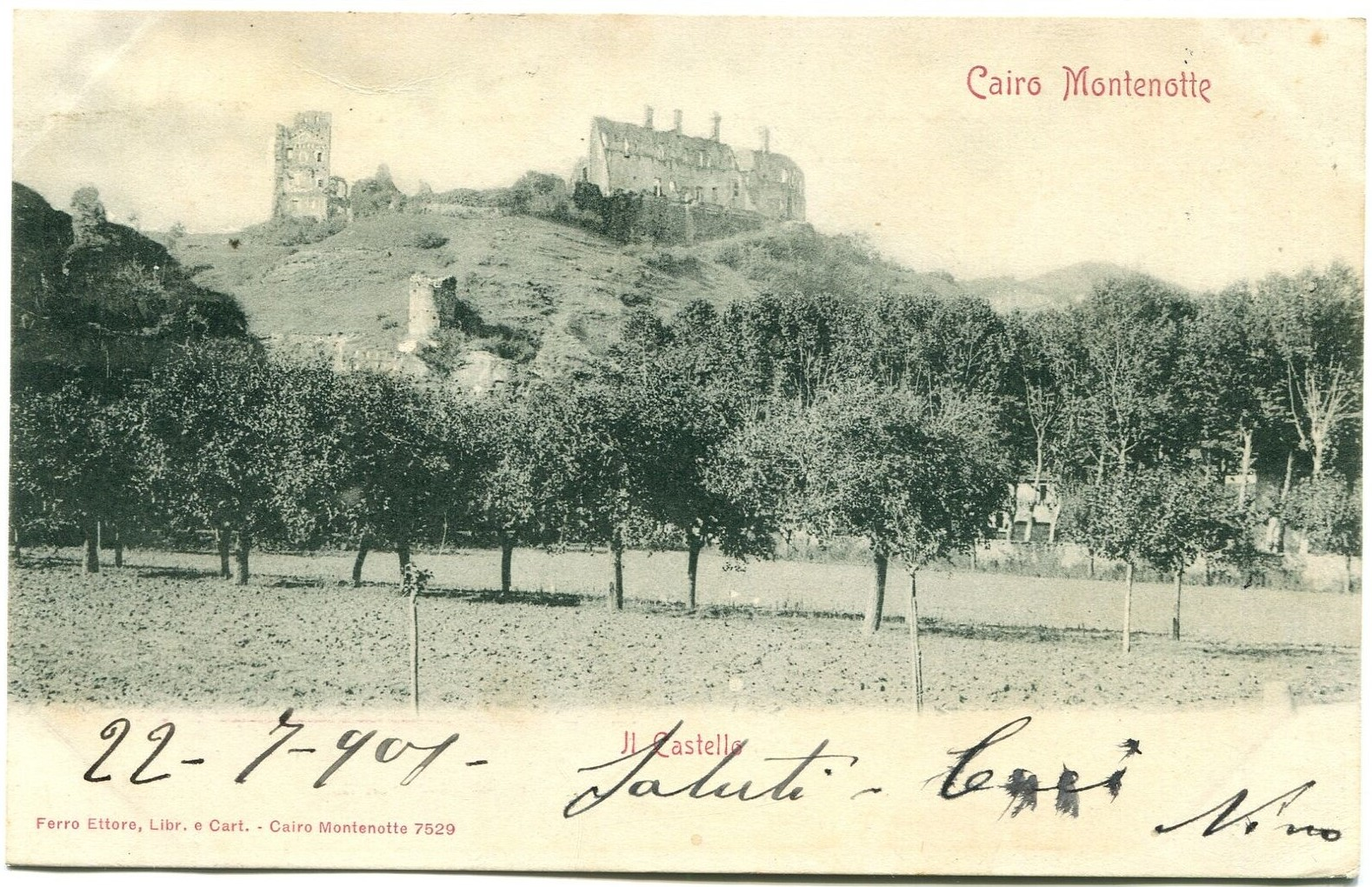
Cairo Montenotte's Castle

=== Military buildings ===
- Cairo Montenotte Castle. It was built in the eleventh-twelfth century (there are no reliable sources) and it was under the control of Ottone Del Carretto, and then sold in Genoa. In 1337 it became a fief of the Scarampi family, who lived there until the seventeenth century. In 1625 it was involved in the War of Zuccarello between the Republic of Genoa and the Duke of Savoy, whose troops destroyed it in 1627.
- Castello di Rocchetta Cairo. First mentioned on 5 November 1235, it was sold by the Knights Hospitaller of San Giovanni to Ottone I Del Carretto. It also passed to the Scarampi in 1337 and, later, to the Incisa di Camerana. It suffered serious damage during the Napoleonic battle of Dego (First Battle of Dego, 1794).
- Castello di Carretto. Dated back to the second half of the thirteenth century and partially ruined. It was an important point of sighting and signaling along the "via marenca". From the castle you can see other manors of Del Carretto (Rocchetta, Cairo and Dego).

=== Natural areas ===
In the municipal territory of Cairo Montenotte there are two sites of Community Importance, proposed by the Natura 2000 network of Liguria, for its particular natural and geological interest. The first site is shared between the municipalities of Dego and Cairo Montenotte (Rocchetta Cairo), in the alluvial plain of Bormida. Among the flora is reported the presence of Ligurian saffron (Crocus ligusticus), while among the animal species the black-winged stilt, the red-footed falcon, the hen harrier and the northern lapwing.

The second site, also located between Dego and Rocchetta Cairo, in the Nature Reserve of Adelasia, sees the presence of orchids and quercus × crenata; among the animals the crayfish, the beetle and the greater horseshoe bat.

Other natural sites of the territory are the woods of Montenotte, the Cave of the Elms and the wildlife oasis of the Piana di Rocchetta.

== Demographics ==
According to Istat data on 1 January 2021, the foreign citizens resident in Cairo Montenotte are 1 521, listing the most significant presences divided by nationality:

1. Albania, 464
2. Romania, 229
3. Morocco, 229
4. Senegal, 87
5. Nigeria, 60
6. Ucraina, 53
7. Colombia, 51
8. Pakistan, 26
9. China, 27
10. Ecuador, 26

== Culture ==
=== Education ===
==== School ====
In Cairo Montenotte there are several state educational institutions of secondary school:

- Professional Institute of Industry and Craftsmanship "Leonardo Da Vinci";
- Technical and Industrial Institute "Galileo Ferraris";
- Technical and Commercial Institute for Surveyors "Federico Patetta".

The three are part of a single school institution, which is the Upper Secondary Institute of Cairo Montenotte.

In the town there is also the School of Formation of the Penitentiary Personnel S.F.A.P.P. Andrea "Schivo".

=== Events ===
- "Cairo Medioevale", costume historical re-enactment from 5 to 10 August.
- "Sagra della Tira", gastronomic event that is usually celebrated in July.

=== Cuisine ===
Tira is a typical food from Cairo Montenotte. It has a very ancient history that has been handed down over three centuries.

It is made of a loaf of bread baked in the oven, in the inside there is a sausage.

=== Museum ===
In Cairo Montenotte is located Ferrania Film Museum, museum of industrial and territorial culture located in Palazzo Scarampi. It is dedicated to the company FILM/Ferrania/3M, once a producer of photosensitive material, located in the homonymous town.

== Economy ==
The economy in Cairo Montenotte is mainly connected to the industries and craftmanship, but the area is also specialized in zootechnical activities that made it gain recognition at a national level, particularly for the breeding of bovine cattle.

The main industries work in the chemical, energy and transport sector.

== Infrastructures and transports ==
=== Roads ===
Cairo Montenotte's center is crossed by the state highway 29 of the Colle di Cadibona that connects the town to Dego and Altare. The town is connected to the motorway Autostrada A6 Torino-Savona through the SS29var ‘Variante di Carcare e Collina Vispa’, that originates in San Giuseppe.

Other roads in the territory are: SP9 leading towards the villages of Ville, Carretto and Valle Uzzone; and SP38 leading towards the villages of Bragno and Ferrania. Cairo Montenotte is also connected to the surrounding municipalities and to Savona thanks to a bus line managed by TPL Linea S.r.l. (Trasporti Ponente Ligure).

=== Railway ===
Cairo Montenotte has a train station, not far away from the historical city center. It is on the railway line going from Alessandria to San Giuseppe di Cairo, a branch of the Turin-Fossano-Savona railway line. The town is also linked to the rail axes Turin-Savona through the San Giuseppe di Cairo train station, located a few kilometers from the city center. The train station has been one of the most important Italian ports of call for goods in the period of maximum industrial development for the area.

There are some other train stations within the municipality's borders, in particular in Rocchetta Cairo (on the Savona-Alessandria railway line), Bragno and Ferrania (on the Torino-Savona and Savona-Alessandria lines).

== Administration ==
Term start	Term end	Mayor	Party	Position
1975	1983	Oscar Assandrini	Partito Comunista Italiano	Mayor
30 August 1988	16 July 1990	Osvaldo Chebello	Partito Socialista Italiano	Mayor
16 July 1990	14 March 1994	Pietro Castagneto	Democrazia Cristiana	Mayor
21 March 1994	24 April 1995	Franca Belfiore	Partito Democratico della Sinistra	Mayor
24 April 1995	14 June 1999	Franca Belfiore	Lista Civica di Centro-Sinistra	Mayor
14 June 1999	14 June 2004	Osvaldo Chebello	Partito Socialista Democratico Italiano	Mayor
14 June 2004	29 October 2006	Osvaldo Chebello	Lista Civica di Centro-Sinistra	Mayor
30 October 2006	29 May 2007	Pierluigi Vieri	Democrazia è Libertà - La Margherita	Deputy Mayor
29 May 2007	7 May 2012	Fulvio Briano	Fulvio Briano per Cairo (lista civica di centro-sinistra)	Mayor
7 May 2012	12 June 2017	Fulvio Briano	Fulvio Briano per Cairo 2012 (lista civica di centro-sinistra)	Mayor
12th 2017	In charge	Paolo Lambertini	Noi per Cambiare (lista civica di centro-destra)	Mayor

== Sport ==
=== Baseball and softball ===
Cairo Montenotte's baseball team is called Cairese Baseball, part of the Baseball Club Cairese, which was founded in 1977. Cairo Montenotte's Baseball Club has focused on developing younger players, achieving results in youth categories. Each year, it develops young players who often go on to play for professional teams or youth national teams.

The softball team is called Star Cairo, its first team plays in the Italian A2 series.

Both teams play in baseball fields located in the territory of the municipality that have been specifically built and dedicate to these agonistic disciplines.

=== Football ===
Cairo Montenotte's football teams are:

- Associazione Sportiva Dilettantistica Cairese, that plays in the Eccellenza championship, with track records in Serie C 1946-1948 and 1985–1986, played in Serie C2. Its colors are yellow and blue.
- U.P. Bragno, founded in 1983, plays in the Promozione championship. Its colors are green and white. This team plays in the ‘Paolo Ponzo’ football field located in the village of Bragno, where they play on natural grass.
- A.S.D. Aurora Calcio, that plays in the Seconda Categoria championship, it is the team where Paolo Ponzo played, he was a Serie A player. Its colors and yellow and black.
- U.S. Rocchettese, that plays in Ligurian Seconda Categoria championship. Its colors and red and blue, and it plays in the Rocchetta Cairo’s municipal stadium.

=== Alpine ski ===
Sci Club Cairese, founded in 1977, organizes activities at a pre-competitive level and freeride for the younger members, and activities at a agonistic level for older people. The club, together with the Coordinamento Sci Club Valbormida, adheres to FISI (Federazione Italiana Sport Invernali) in the Ligurian Committee and participates in the Ligurian Cup.

In normal snowmaking conditions, the activities take place at the Mondolè Ski area in the municipalities of Frabosa Sottana and Frabosa Soprana. The Cairo Ski Club always attends Cairo Medievale event.

=== Trekking ===
The Subsection Valbormida of the Club Alpino Italiano (C.A.I.) is based in Cairo Montenotte, more precisely in Porta Soprana, it was founded in 1962 and it is part of Savona's provincial section of C.A.I.

It is considered a free national association that organizes guided mountaineering excursions for mountain enthusiasts.
