= Voltri =

Voltri Utri
- Quartiere
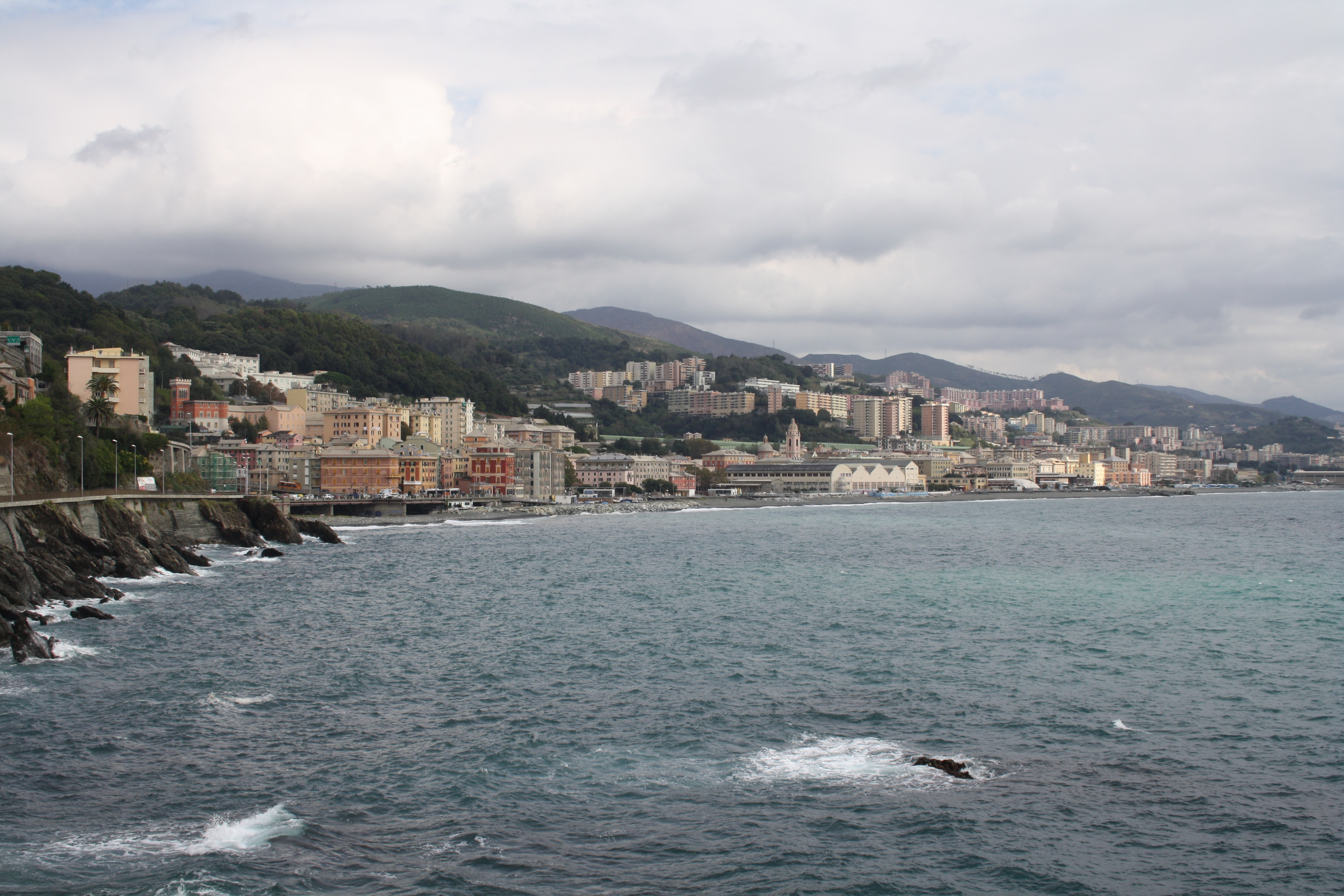
- View of Voltri from the Mulino di Crevari

- Location in Italy
- Coordinates: 44°25′42″N 8°45′8″E
- Country: Italy
- Region: Liguria
- Province: Province of Genoa
- Comune: Genoa

Population
  - Total: 12,402
- Postal code: 16158
- Area code: 010

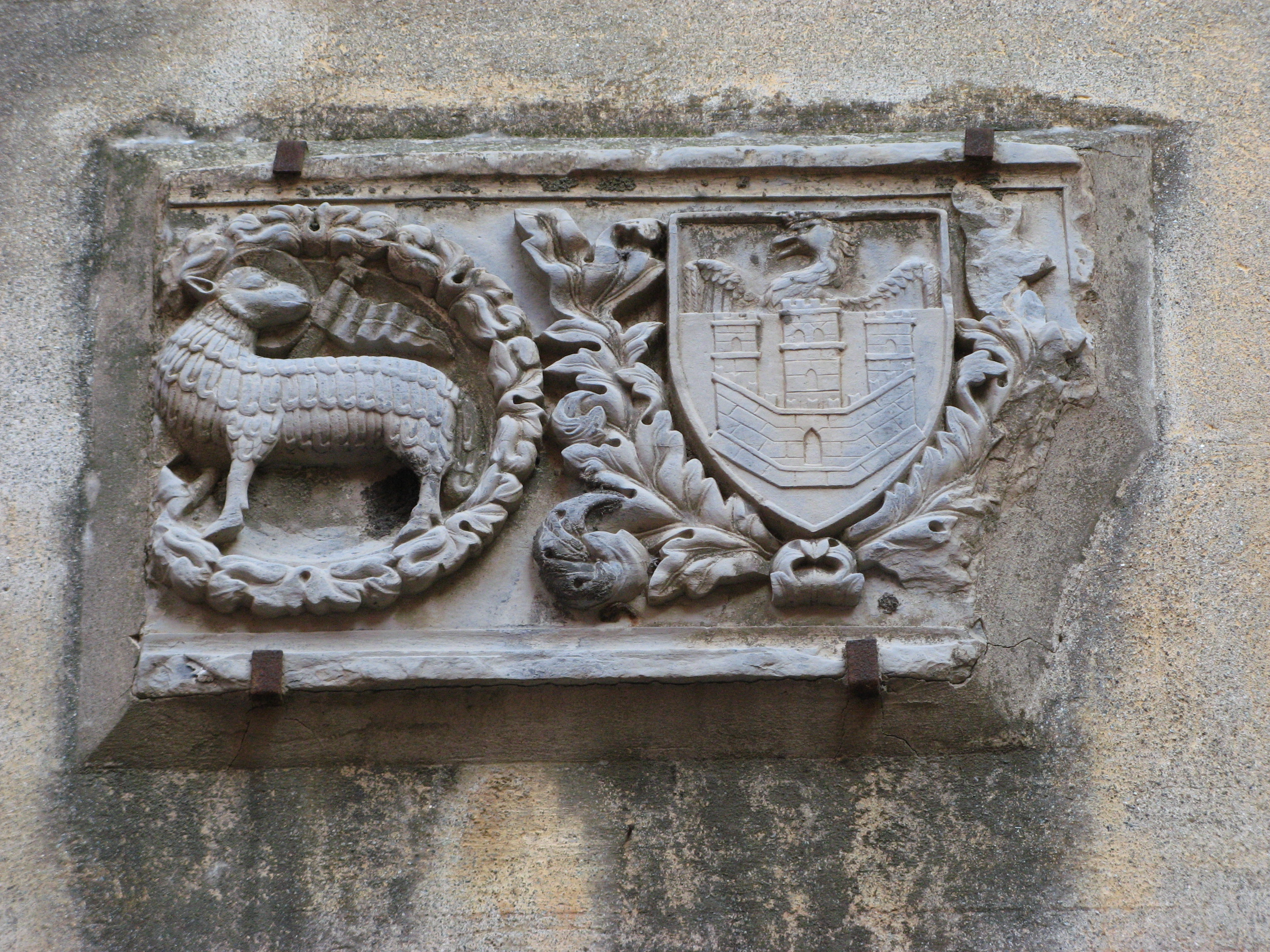
Ancient coat of arms of Voltri

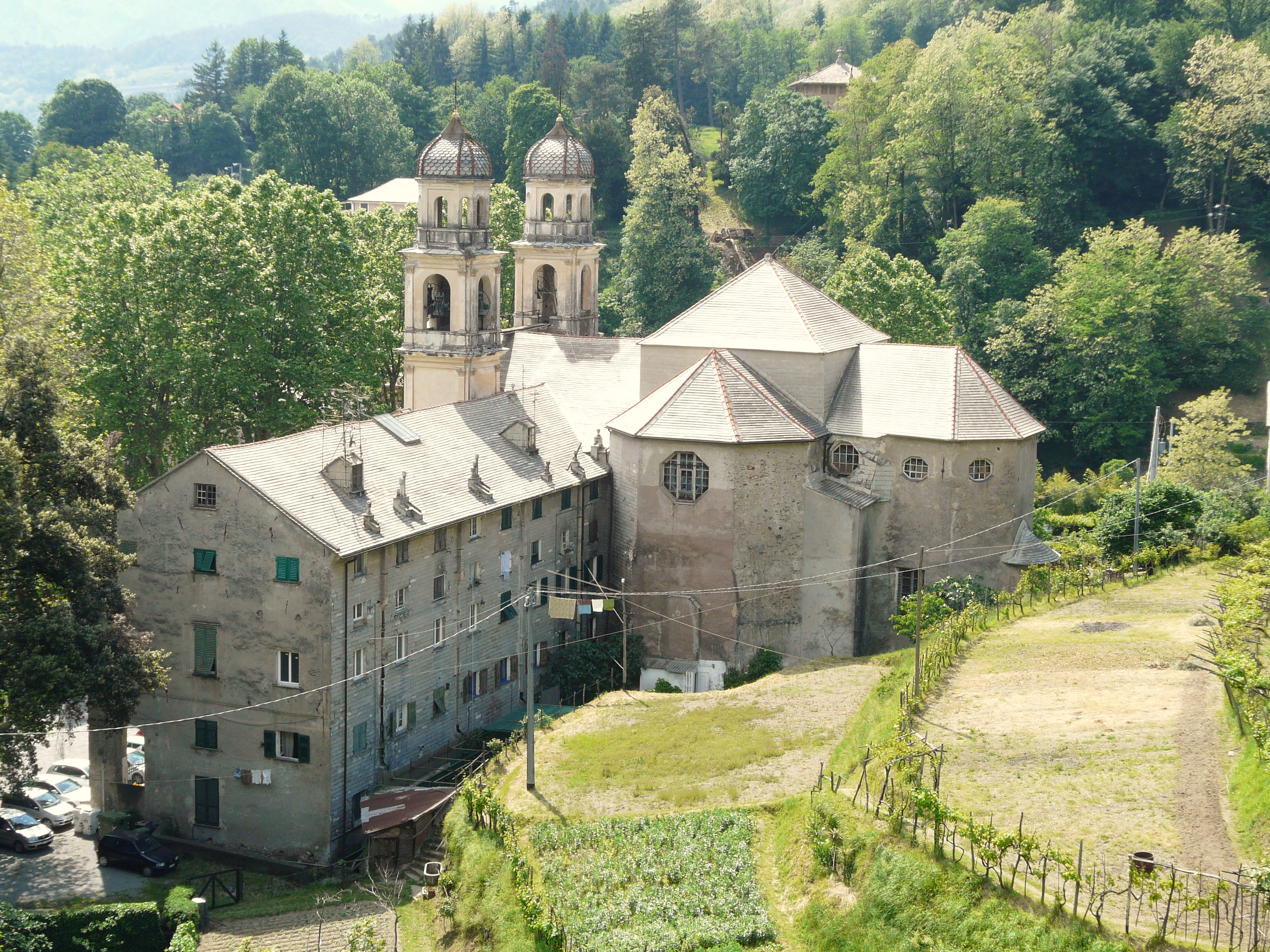
Sanctuary of Nostra Signora di Acquasanta

Voltri is a quartiere of the Italian city of Genoa, located 17 kilometres (10.6 mi) west of the city centre. It was formerly an independent comune.

In 2015, Voltri and the nearby hamlets included in Genoa's VII Municipio (Crevari, Acquasanta, Vesima, Fabbriche) had a total population of 12,402. Voltri is one of the 3 former municipalities (the other ones are Pra' and Pegli) being part of the Genoa's city VII Municipio.

== History ==
The area of Voltri was inhabited since prehistoric times, and was a center of the Ligures tribe of the Veituri, from which it probably took its name. In the Middle Ages it was a hamlet part of the Republic of Genoa, its main activity being the production of paper.

In 1796 Voltri was the site of a battle between the French troops of Napoléon Bonaparte and of the Austrian Empire allied with the Kingdom of Sardinia-Piedmont. After the fall of the First French Empire, it became an autonomous commune in the Sardinian territories, a status it kept until 1926, when the Fascist government united it to Genoa.

== Main sights ==
- Sanctuary of Madonna delle Grazie, a Capuchine monastery
- Sanctuary of Nostra Signora dell'Acquasanta (built in 1683-1718), a Baroque sanctuary housing works by Lazzaro Tavarone, Anton Maria Maragliano, Antonio Brilla and Domenico Fiasella.
- Church of Sant'Ambrogio
- Villa Brignole Sale Duchessa di Galliera

== Transportation ==
Voltri is served by a station on the Genoa-Ventimiglia railroad. Another railway station is present in Acquasanta along the Genoa-Acqui Terme railroad, 6 km far from Voltri. It is also crossed by the SS1 Via Aurelia national road and by the A10 and the A26 motorways. The motorway exit is located in Pra, 1 km from Voltri. From Voltri it is possible to overcome the Appennino ligure by traveling via the passo del Turchino.

== See also ==
- Cerusa
