= Anton Giulio Barrili =

Patriot and writer from Italy (1836–1908)

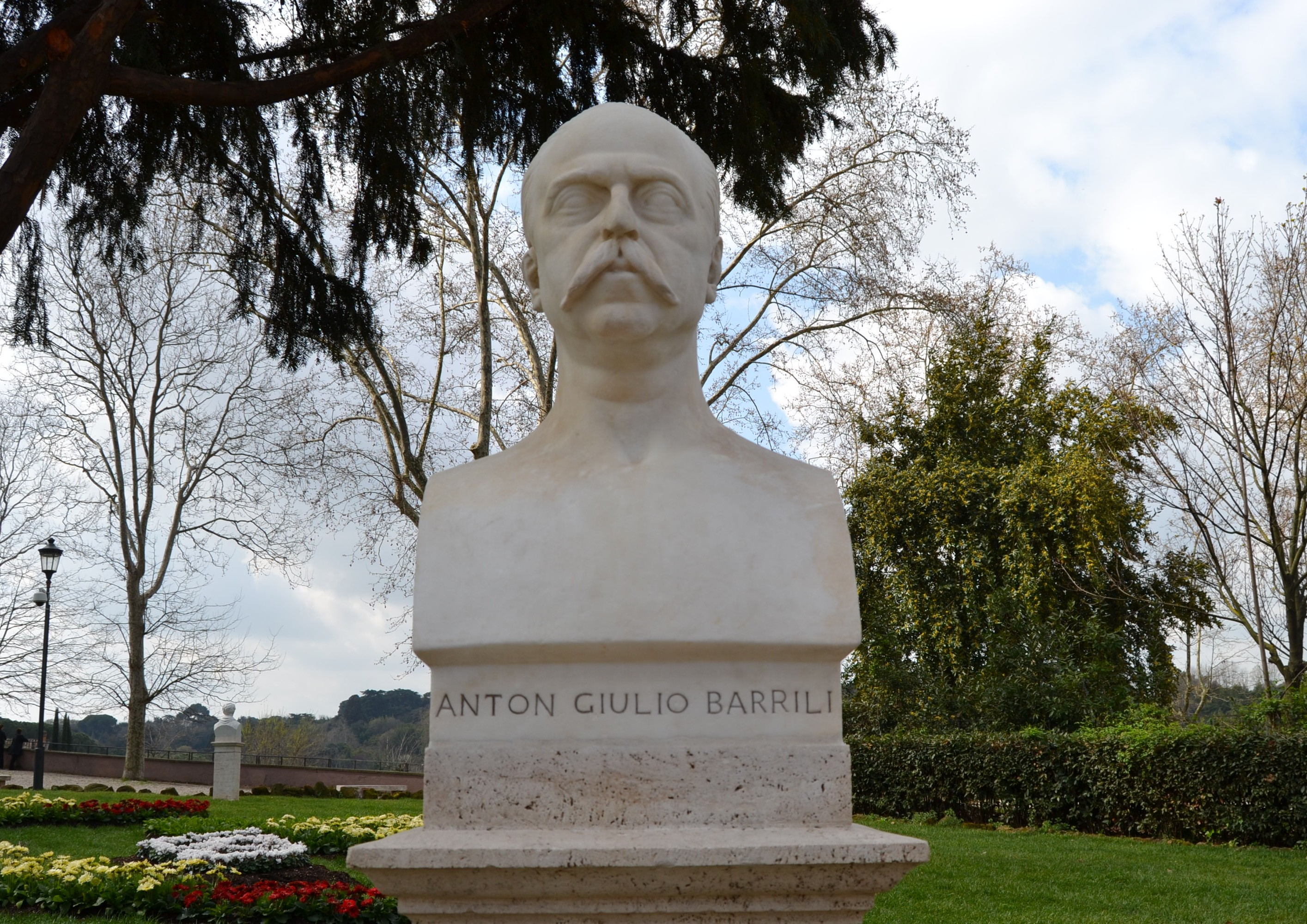
Bust of Barrili in Rome.

Anton Giulio Barrili (14 December 1836 in Savona – 14 August 1908 in Carcare) was an Italian novelist. He was educated for the legal profession, which he abandoned in Genoa for journalism. He was a volunteer in the campaign of 1859 and served with Garibaldi in 1866 (Austro-Prussian War, Third Italian War of Independence) and 1867. From 1865 onwards he published a large number of books of fiction, which had wide popularity, his work being commonly compared with that of Victor Cherbuliez.

Some of the best of the later ones are Santa Cecilia (1866), Come un sogno (1875), and L'olmo e l'edera (1877). His Raggio di Dio appeared in 1899. Barrili also wrote two plays and various volumes of criticism, including Il rinnovamento letterario italiano (1890). He was elected to the Italian chamber of deputies in 1876; and in 1889 became professor of Italian literature at the University of Genoa.

== Biography ==
He spent his childhood in Nice, which at the time belonged to the Kingdom of Sardinia, and finished his high school studies in Savona at the Scolopians, later graduating with a degree in Literature and Philosophy from the University of Genoa. He then embarked on a career as a Journalist, founding a first newspaper, L'occhialetto, drafted in its entirety by his own hand. He later became one of the editors of the San Giorgio, a newspaper founded and led by Nino Bixio.

In 1859 he enlisted as a volunteer in the Royal Sardinian Army, participating in several campaigns with the VII Infantry Regiment. The following year he joined the editorial staff of the Garibaldi propaganda newspaper Il Movimento, becoming its editor and spokesman for the general's exploits.

Barrili fought alongside Invasion of Trentino (1866) in 1866 as a volunteer in the 8th Regiment of the Italian Volunteer Corps; he fought and was wounded on Nov. 3, 1867, in the Battle of Mentana, when Garibaldi's troops, attempting to conquer Rome, were defeated by Napoleon III. His experience in the wars of the Risorgimento was later narrated in a memoir, Con Garibaldi alle porte di Roma (1895).

Returning to Genoa, in 1875 he founded the newspaper Il Caffaro, in which he published some of his works as appendices. He ran for the Chamber of Deputies (Kingdom of Italy) on the lists of the Left, was elected in 1876, but resigned in 1879 to devote himself to teaching in high schools.

He moved to Rome in 1884 to take over the editorship of La Domenica letteraria, then returned to Genoa, obtaining in 1894, thanks to the support of Giosuè Carducci, the chair of Italian Literature at the University of Genoa; he was appointed rector in 1903.

In the 1880s he was initiated into Freemasonry in Italy in the Trionfo Ligure Lodge in Genoa, Italy.

In old age he retired to Villa Maura, his summer residence in Carcare, dying there at 10:50 p.m. on August 14, 1908.

Anton Giulio Barrili is buried in the Monumental Cemetery of Staglieno in Genoa. Several streets have been dedicated to Barrili: in Genoa,Milan, Rome, Turin, Savona, Alassio, Finale Ligure,Millesimo and Carcare.

== Bibliography ==
- Chisholm, Hugh, ed. (1911). "Barrili, Antonio Giulio" . Encyclopædia Britannica (11th ed.). Cambridge University Press.
