= Pontinvrea =

- Comune
- Comune di Pontinvrea
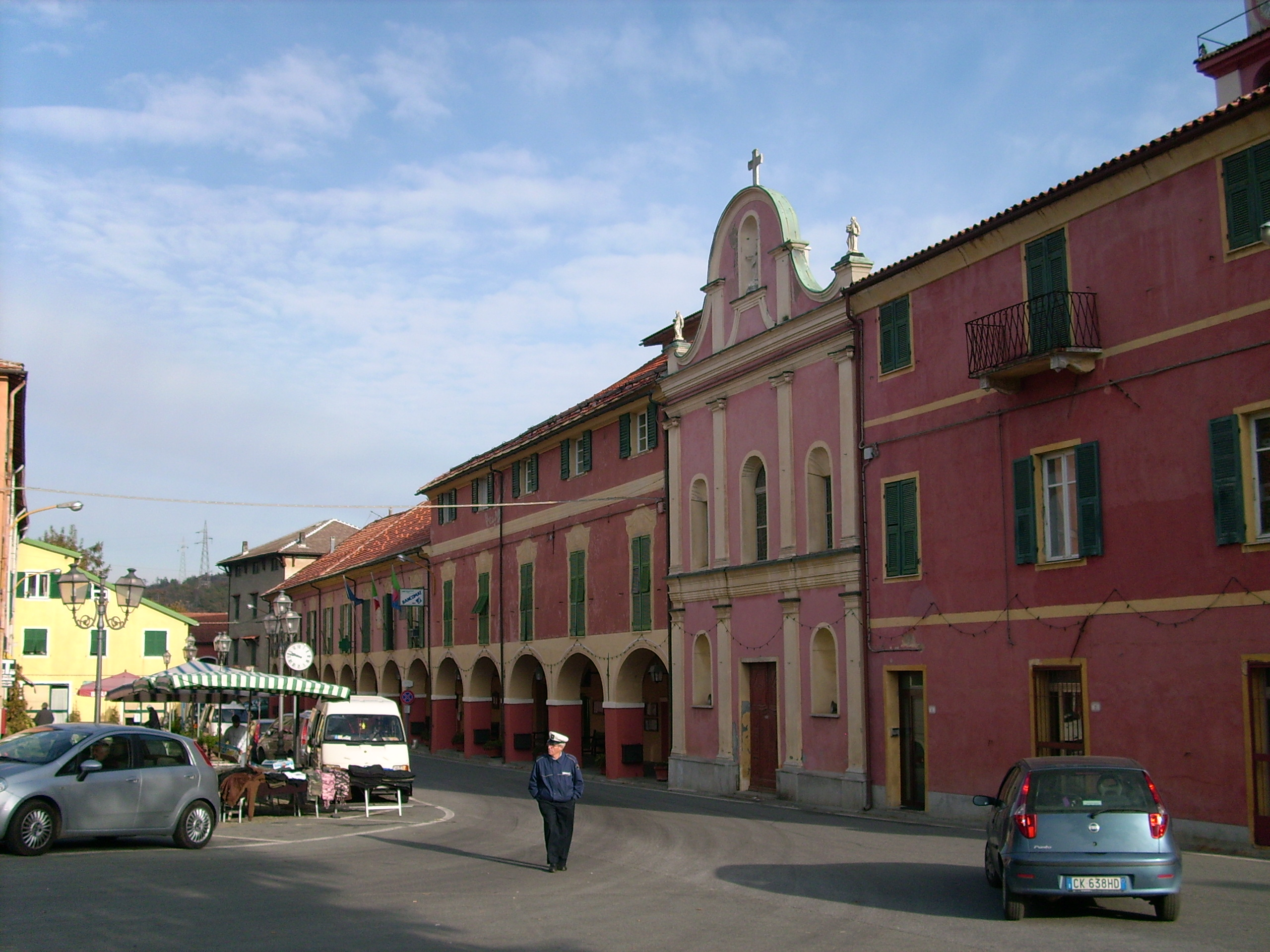

- Location within Italy Location within Liguria
- Coordinates: 44°26′N 8°26′E
- Country: Italy
- Region: Liguria
- Province: Savona (SV)
- Frazioni: Giovo Ligure, Ferriera

Government
  - Mayor: Matteo Camiciottoli

Area
  - Total: 24.8 km^{2} (9.6 sq mi)
- Elevation: 425 m (1,394 ft)

Population (31 December 2015)
  - Total: 847
  - Density: 34.2/km^{2} (88.5/sq mi)
- Demonym: Pontesini
- Time zone: UTC+1 (CET)
  - Summer (DST): UTC+2 (CEST)
- Postal code: 17042
- Dialing code: 019
- Patron saint: San Lorenzo
- Saint day: 10 August
- Website: Official website

Pontinvrea (Ligurian: O Ponte) is a comune (municipality) in the Province of Savona in the Italian region of Liguria, located about 40 kilometres (25 mi) west of Genoa and about 15 kilometres (9 mi) northwest of Savona.

The municipality of Pontinvrea contains the frazioni (subdivisions, mainly villages and hamlets) Giovo Ligure and Ferriera.

Pontinvrea borders the following municipalities: Albisola Superiore, Cairo Montenotte, Giusvalla, Mioglia, Sassello, and Stella.
