= Mioglia =

- Comune
- Comune di Mioglia
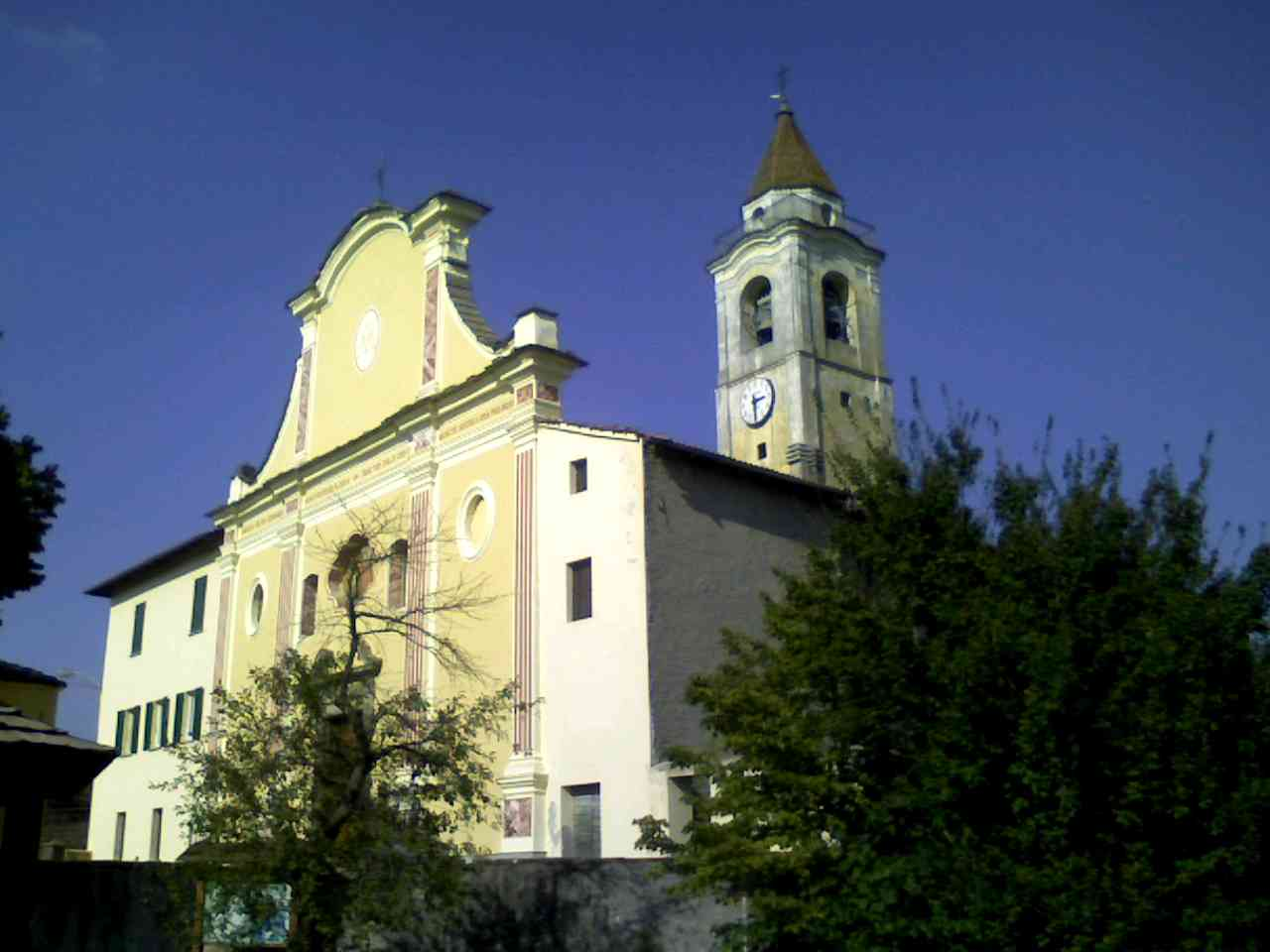
- Saint Andrew Church

- Coat of arms

- Location within Italy Location within Liguria
- Coordinates: 44°29′N 8°25′E
- Country: Italy
- Region: Liguria
- Province: Province of Savona (SV)

Area
  - Total: 20.0 km^{2} (7.7 sq mi)

Population (Dec. 2004)
  - Total: 536
  - Density: 26.8/km^{2} (69.4/sq mi)
- Demonym: Miogliesi
- Time zone: UTC+1 (CET)
  - Summer (DST): UTC+2 (CEST)
- Postal code: 17040
- Dialing code: 019

Mioglia (Ligurian: Mieuja; Piedmontese: Mioja) is a comune (municipality) in the Province of Savona in the Italian region Liguria, located about 40 kilometres (25 mi) west of Genoa and about 20 kilometres (12 mi) north of Savona. As of 31 December 2004, it had a population of 536 and an area of 20.0 square kilometres (7.7 mi^{2}).

Mioglia borders the following municipalities: Giusvalla, Pareto, Pontinvrea, and Sassello.

== Demographic evolution ==
Historical population

Year	Pop.	±%
1861	1,022	—
1871	1,006	−1.6%
1881	1,111	+10.4%
1901	1,132	+1.9%
1911	1,205	+6.4%

Year	Pop.	±%
1921	1,237	+2.7%
1931	1,166	−5.7%
1936	1,133	−2.8%
1951	995	−12.2%
1961	809	−18.7%

Year	Pop.	±%
1971	682	−15.7%
1981	585	−14.2%
1991	588	+0.5%
2001	561	−4.6%

Source: Data from ISTAT
