= Giusvalla =

- Comune
- Comune di Giusvalla
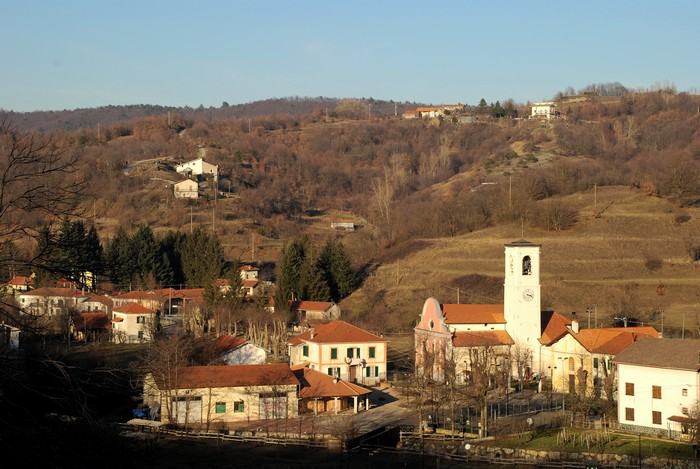
- Giusvalla

- Coat of arms

- Location within Italy Location within Liguria
- Coordinates: 44°27′N 8°24′E
- Country: Italy
- Region: Liguria
- Province: Province of Savona (SV)

Area
  - Total: 19.1 km^{2} (7.4 sq mi)

Population (Dec. 2004)
  - Total: 439
  - Density: 23.0/km^{2} (59.5/sq mi)
- Time zone: UTC+1 (CET)
  - Summer (DST): UTC+2 (CEST)
- Postal code: 17010
- Dialing code: 019

Giusvalla (Ligurian: Giüsvala, Piedmontese: Giusvâla) is a comune (municipality) in the Province of Savona in the Italian region Liguria, located about 45 kilometres (28 mi) west of Genoa and about 20 kilometres (12 mi) northwest of Savona. As of 31 December 2004, it had a population of 439 and an area of 19.1 square kilometres (7.4 mi^{2}).

Giusvalla borders the following municipalities: Cairo Montenotte, Dego, Mioglia, Pareto, Pontinvrea, and Spigno Monferrato.

== Demographic evolution ==
Historical population

Year	Pop.	±%
1861	1,197	—
1871	1,093	−8.7%
1881	1,026	−6.1%
1901	1,076	+4.9%
1911	1,060	−1.5%

Year	Pop.	±%
1921	991	−6.5%
1931	869	−12.3%
1936	807	−7.1%
1951	772	−4.3%
1961	627	−18.8%

Year	Pop.	±%
1971	532	−15.2%
1981	471	−11.5%
1991	461	−2.1%
2001	425	−7.8%

Source: Data from ISTAT

== Events ==
- first week of July : Festa al Bricco della Croce.
- second week of July : Giusvalla in Festa.
- first week of September : Festa al Mulino (loc. Mulino).
- 8 September : Festa alla Cappelletta dei Prati Proia.
- 21 September : Festa Patronale di S. Matteo.
