= Paolo Ponzo =

Italian footballer (1972–2013)

Personal information
- Date of birth: 11 March 1972
- Place of birth: Cairo Montenotte, Italy
- Date of death: 24 March 2013 (aged 41)
- Place of death: Pietra Ligure, Italy
- Height: 1.74 m (5 ft 8 1/2 in)
- Position: Midfielder

Team information
- Current team: Imperia

Youth career
- 1991–1992: Genoa

Senior career*
Years	Team	Apps	(Gls)
1988–1991	F.C. Vado	76	(2)
1992–1995	Montevarchi Calcio Aquila 1902	90	(2)
1995–1997	AC Cesena	71	(1)
1997–1998	Ravenna Calcio	4	(0)
1998–2000	A.C. Reggiana 1919	63	(1)
2000	→ Calcio Savoia (loan)	15	(0)
2000–2005	Modena F.C.	134	(1)
2005–2007	Spezia Calcio	55	(0)
2007–2009	A.C. Reggiana 1919	60	(2)
2009–2011	Savona 1907 F.B.C.	54	(2)
2011–2012	A.S.D. Imperia Calcio		
- * Club domestic league appearances and goals

Paolo Ponzo (11 March 1972 – 24 March 2013) was an Italian footballer who last played as a midfielder for Liguria club Imperia.

== Career ==
=== Early career ===
Born in Cairo Montenotte, Liguria, Ponzo started his senior career with Serie D club Vado. In 1991–92 Serie A season, he was signed by one of the largest club in Liguria region, Genoa C.F.C. He played a season with its youth team and left for Montevarchi in 1992.

=== Serie B teams ===
After 3 Serie C2 seasons with the Tuscany team, he was signed by Serie B club Cesena. After the club relegated, he left for Serie B club Ravenna in 1997.

He played 4 times for the Emilia–Romagna club and moved to regional and league rival Reggiana in January 1998, in exchange with Sebastiano Vecchiola.

In January 2000, he was signed by Serie B club Savoia from Reggiana, at that time at Serie C1. He played 15 times for the Campania club. Savoia finished as the bottom team and relegated.

=== Modena ===
In 2000, he was signed by Modena, his second Serie C1 club. He followed the team promoted to Serie B as Serie C1 champion and promoted to Serie A as Serie B runner-up. From 2002 to 2004, he played 43 Serie A matches. He made his Serie A debut on 14 September 2002, losing to AC Milan 0–3. He followed the team relegated back to Serie B in 2004.

=== Spezia ===
In 2005, he left for Serie C1 club Spezia, which is from his home region. He won promotion to Serie B again as champion. in 2006–07 Serie B season, he played 27 matches in all competitions, started 20 times. He was on the bench in the relegation play-out.

=== Later career ===
In 2007, Ponzo was re-signed by Reggiana. He played 2 seasons for the club in Serie C2/Seconda Divisione. In July 2009, he left to play for Savona from his home province, the Province of Savona. He made 32 league appearances for the club and won promotion back to professional league as Group A champion.

== Death ==
On 24 March 2013 Ponzo died of a heart attack during the Maremontana running race.

== Career statistics ==
- Serie A Apps 43 : 2002–04 (Modena)
- Serie B Apps 331 : 1995–97 (Cesena), 1997 (Ravenna), 1999-00 (Savoia), 1998–99 (Reggiana), 2001–02 2004–05 (Modena), 2006–07 (Spezia)
- Serie C1 Apps 114 : 1999-00 2008–09 (Reggiana), 2000–01 (Modena), 2005–06 (Spezia)
- Serie C2 Apps 142 : 1992–95 (Montevarchi), 2007–08 (Reggiana), 2010–11 (Savona)
- Serie D Apps 32 : 2009–10 (Savona)
- Eccellenza Apps 76 : 1988–91 (Vado), 2011–12 (Imperia)
