= Dego, Liguria =

Dego
- Comune
- Comune di Dego
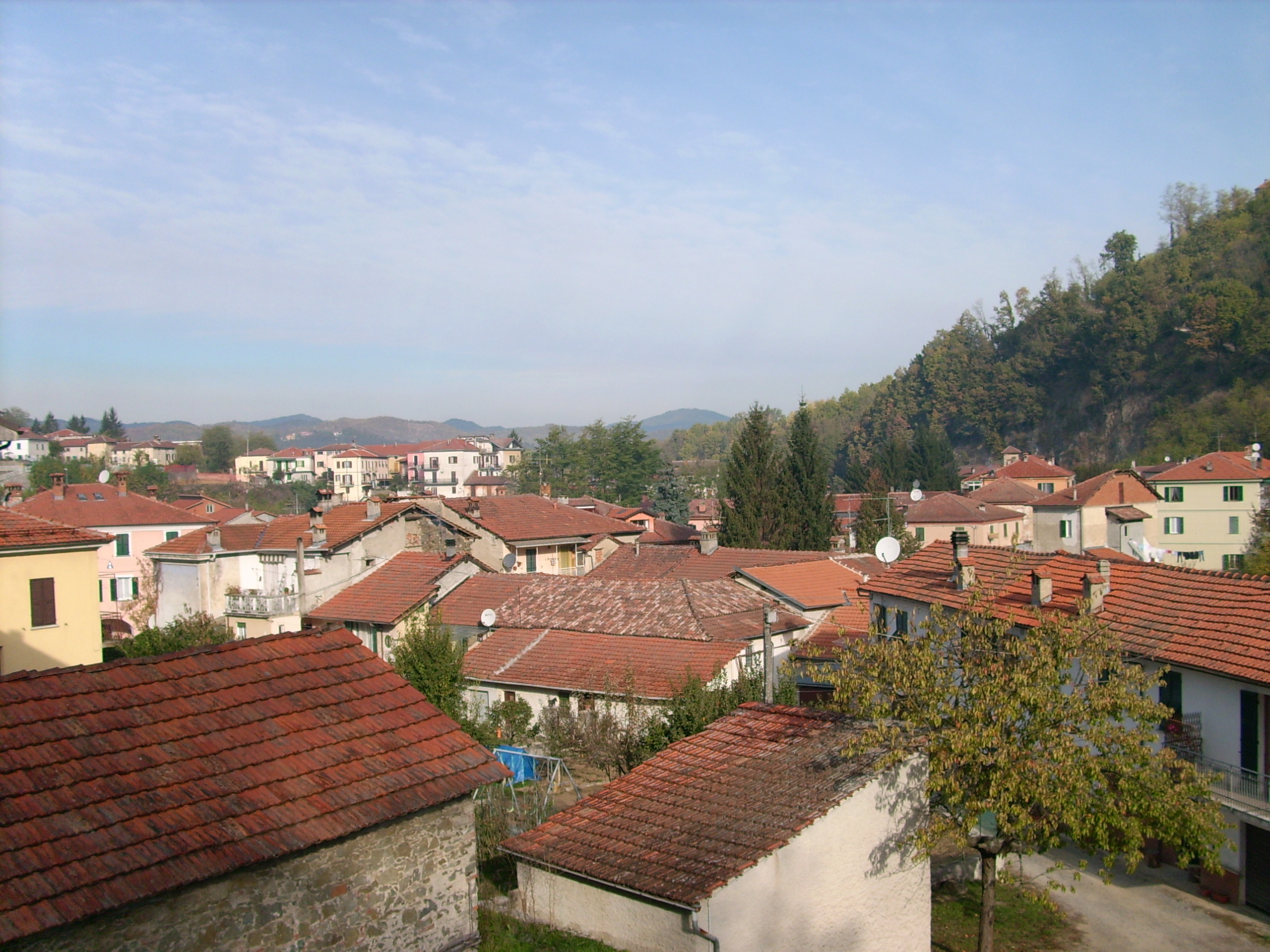

- Coat of arms

- Location within Italy Location within Liguria
- Coordinates: 44°27′N 8°19′E
- Country: Italy
- Region: Liguria
- Province: Savona (SV)
- Frazioni: Bormiola, Botta, Brogi, Cà Bulin-Certosa della Trinità, Chiaffoni, Chiesa Brovida, Costalupara, Girini, Governatori, La Costa, Noceto, Niosa, Piano, Porri, Santa Giulia, Sanvarezzo, Saraffi, Supervia

Government
  - Mayor: Franco Siri

Area
  - Total: 67.9 km^{2} (26.2 sq mi)
- Elevation: 317 m (1,040 ft)

Population (30 June 2019)
  - Total: 1,956
  - Density: 28.8/km^{2} (74.6/sq mi)
- Demonym: Deghesi
- Time zone: UTC+1 (CET)
  - Summer (DST): UTC+2 (CEST)
- Postal code: 17058
- Dialing code: 019
- Patron saint: Saint Ambrose
- Saint day: December 7
- Website: Official website

Dego (Italian pronunciation: [ˈdeːɡo]; Ligurian: O Dê [u ˈdeː]) is a town and comune in the Province of Savona in the region Liguria, in Northwestern Italy.

== Geography ==
The municipality of Dego is located on the northern side of the Ligurian Apennines, on the border with Piedmont. The main population centre lies at the confluence of the Grillero stream and the Bormida di Spigno.

Dego is about 50 kilometres (31 mi) west of the regional capital Genoa and about 20 kilometres (12 mi) northwest of the provincial seat Savona.

Dego borders the municipalities of Piana Crixia and Spigno Monferrato to the north; Giusvalla to the east; Cairo Montenotte to the south; and Castelletto Uzzone and Gottasecca to the west.
