= Stella, Liguria =

Stella
- Comune
- Comune di Stella
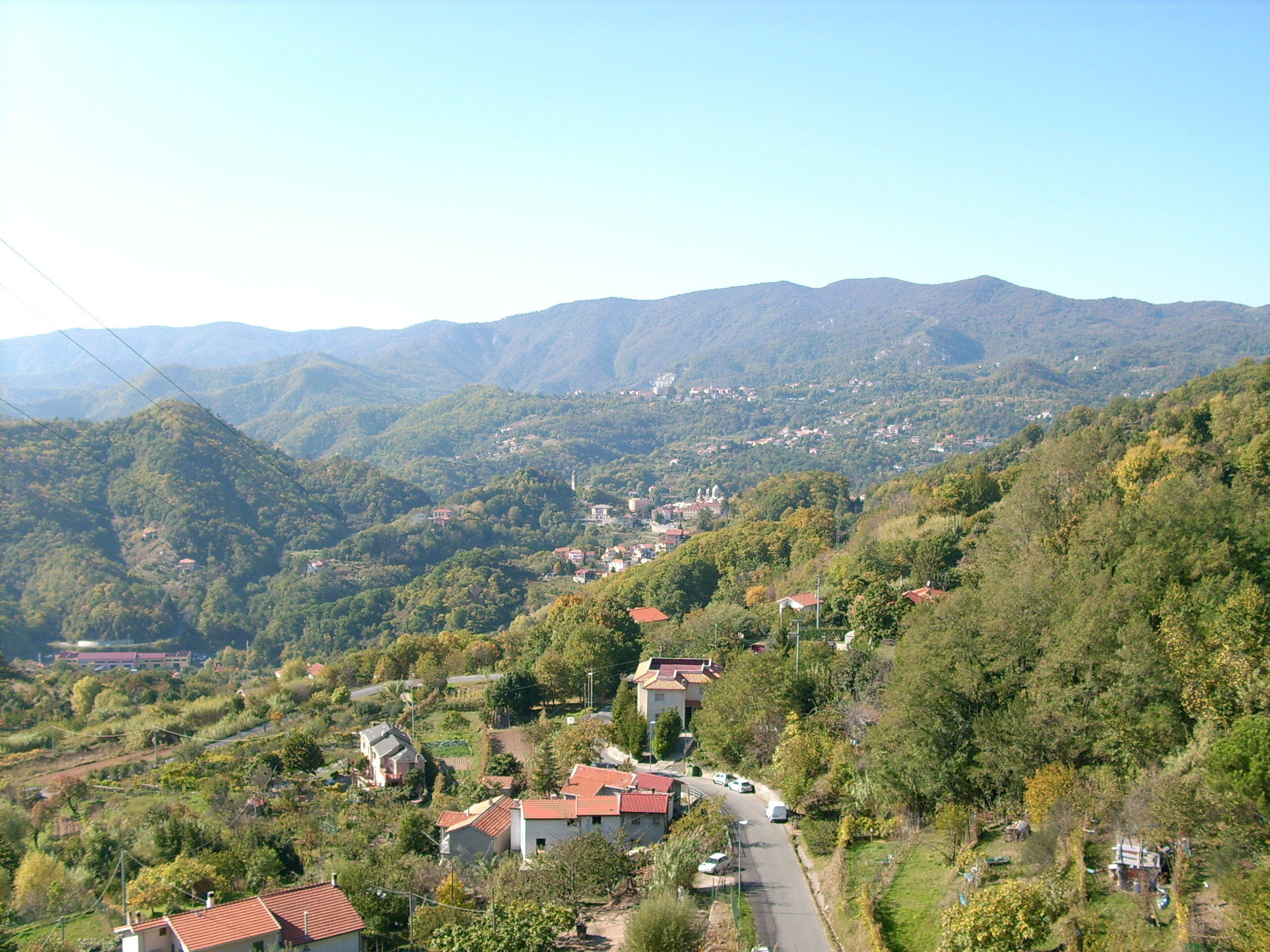

- Location within Italy Location within Liguria
- Coordinates: 44°24′N 8°30′E
- Country: Italy
- Region: Liguria
- Province: Savona (SV)
- Frazioni: Gameragna, San Bernardo, San Giovanni, San Martino, Santa Giustina

Government
  - Mayor: Marina Lombardi

Area
  - Total: 43.68 km^{2} (16.86 sq mi)

Population (1 January 2018)
  - Total: 3,006
  - Density: 68.82/km^{2} (178.2/sq mi)
- Demonym: Stellesi
- Time zone: UTC+1 (CET)
  - Summer (DST): UTC+2 (CEST)
- Postal code: 17040
- Dialing code: 019
- Website: Official website

Stella (Ligurian: A Steja, lit. 'The Star') is a comune (municipality) of the Province of Savona in the Italian region of Liguria. The municipality has a population of 3,006 (as of 1 January 2018) and extends over an area of 43.68 square kilometres (16.86 mi^{2}). It borders the comuni of Albisola Superiore, Celle Ligure, Pontinvrea, Sassello and Varazze.

The town is best known as the birthplace of President Sandro Pertini, who is buried there along with his wife Carla Voltolina.

== Frazioni ==
The municipality is divided into five distinct localities, or frazioni, known locally as the cinque stelle, or 'five stars'.

- Stella San Giovanni, some ten minutes by car from the sea and adjacent to Albisola, is the site of the town hall. Sandro Pertini, seventh President of the Italian Republic was born here and is buried in its cemetery.
- Stella San Giustina, five minutes by car to the north of San Giovanni and about 15 from the sea, is located in an area rich in woodland. Its original name was Danaveta and in the Middle Ages it was a possession of the Abbey of Santa Giustina, Sezzadio. A landmark is the eighteenth-century chimney which belonged to a tannery which was destroyed by a flood in the 1920s.
- Stella San Martino, thought to be the earliest of the settlements, stands on a hill to the east of San Giovanni. The houses and the parish church bear characteristic sundials.
- Stella San Bernardo is the westernmost of the frazioni. The surrounding wooded mountains, rich in streams, and the panoramic views which it affords, make it popular centre for holiday makers.
- Stella Gameragna is the southernmost of the frazioni and the closest to the sea. Its historic centre is characterised by narrow lanes.

== Demographic evolution ==
Historical population

Year	Pop.	±%
1861	3,407	—
1871	3,515	+3.2%
1881	3,229	−8.1%
1901	3,609	+11.8%
1911	3,479	−3.6%

Year	Pop.	±%
1921	3,471	−0.2%
1931	3,230	−6.9%
1936	3,025	−6.3%
1951	2,659	−12.1%
1961	2,289	−13.9%

Year	Pop.	±%
1971	1,940	−15.2%
1981	2,212	+14.0%
1991	2,587	+17.0%
2001	2,935	+13.5%

Source: Data from ISTAT
