= Anton Maria Maragliano =

Italian sculptor

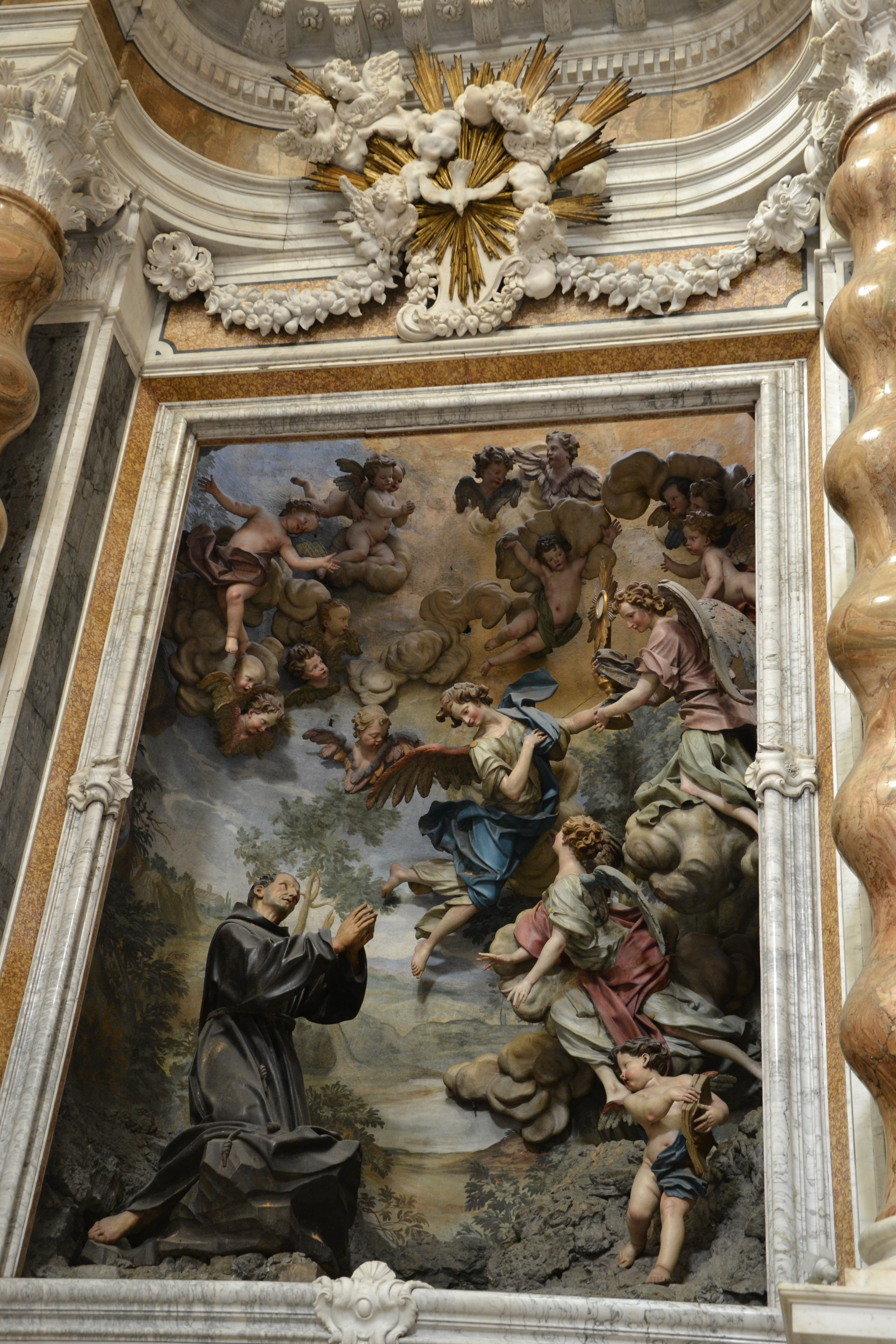
Vision of St. Pascal Baylon in the church of Santissima Annunziata del Vastato in Genoa

Anton Maria Maragliano (18 September 1664 – 7 March 1739) was an Italian sculptor of the Baroque period, known primarily for his wooden statues. He was born in Genoa, where he led an important workshop.

He is called also Maraggiano by some ancient authors.

He pioneered important developments in the style of sculpting in wood, parallel to those driven by Filippo Parodi in marble sculpture and Domenico Piola in painting.

His workshop produced many typical religious sculptures, representing Madonnas, figures of saints and narrative scenes from the Bible. These are now preserved in many churches and sanctuaries throughout Liguria (mainly in Genoa, Rapallo, Chiavari, Celle Ligure, Savona) and also in Spain.

For the Casacce (the Genoese confraternities) he also produced statues and crucifixes to be carried in processions on feast days.

He was called by Casalis, the Phidias of Genoa. His son Giovanni Battista Maragliano was also a wood sculptor in Cádiz and Lisbon, till his death during a robbery in the latter city. Among other pupils were Francesco and Pietro Galeano.

== Works ==
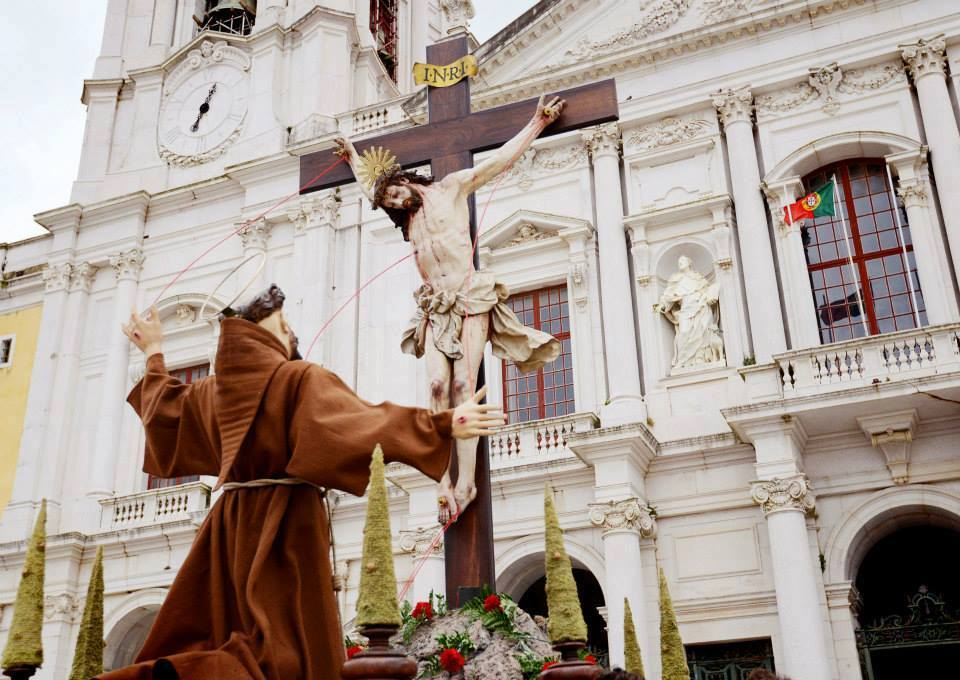
The crucifix of the Royal and Venerable Confraternity of the Most Blessed Sacrament of Mafra – Mafra, Portugal

His works include:

- St. Francis's Ecstasy in the Church of Padre Santo (St. Francesco Maria da Camporosso) in Genoa
- Vision of St. Pascal Baylon in the church of Santissima Annunziata del Vastato in Genoa
- Procession statues of St. Anthony Abbot and St. Paul the First Hermit, preserved in the church of St. Anthony Abbot (Mele – Genoa)
- St. Michael Archangel in the Oratory of San Michele (Celle Ligure)
- Figures of the crib at the Sanctuary of Madonnetta, Genoa
- In Cádiz: Madonna del Carmine,San Raffaele Archangel,Risen Christ
- In Santa Margherita Ligure three interesting works: Guardian Angel and St. John Nepomunk at the Basilica of St. Margaret of Antiochia, Santa Margherita Ligure and St. Erasmus at the Oratory of Sant'Erasmo.
- A wooden Madonna preserved in the church of San Francesco alla Chiappetta at Bolzaneto (Genoa)
- A crucifix in the church of Santa Croce, in Moneglia.
- A wooden Madonna of San Giorgio at Bormida (Province of Savona) (uncertainly attributed to him).
- The crucifix of the Royal and Venerable Confraternity of the Most Blessed Sacrament of Mafra – Mafra, Portugal
