= Carcare =

Carcare Corcre (Piedmontese)
- Comune
- Comune di Carcare
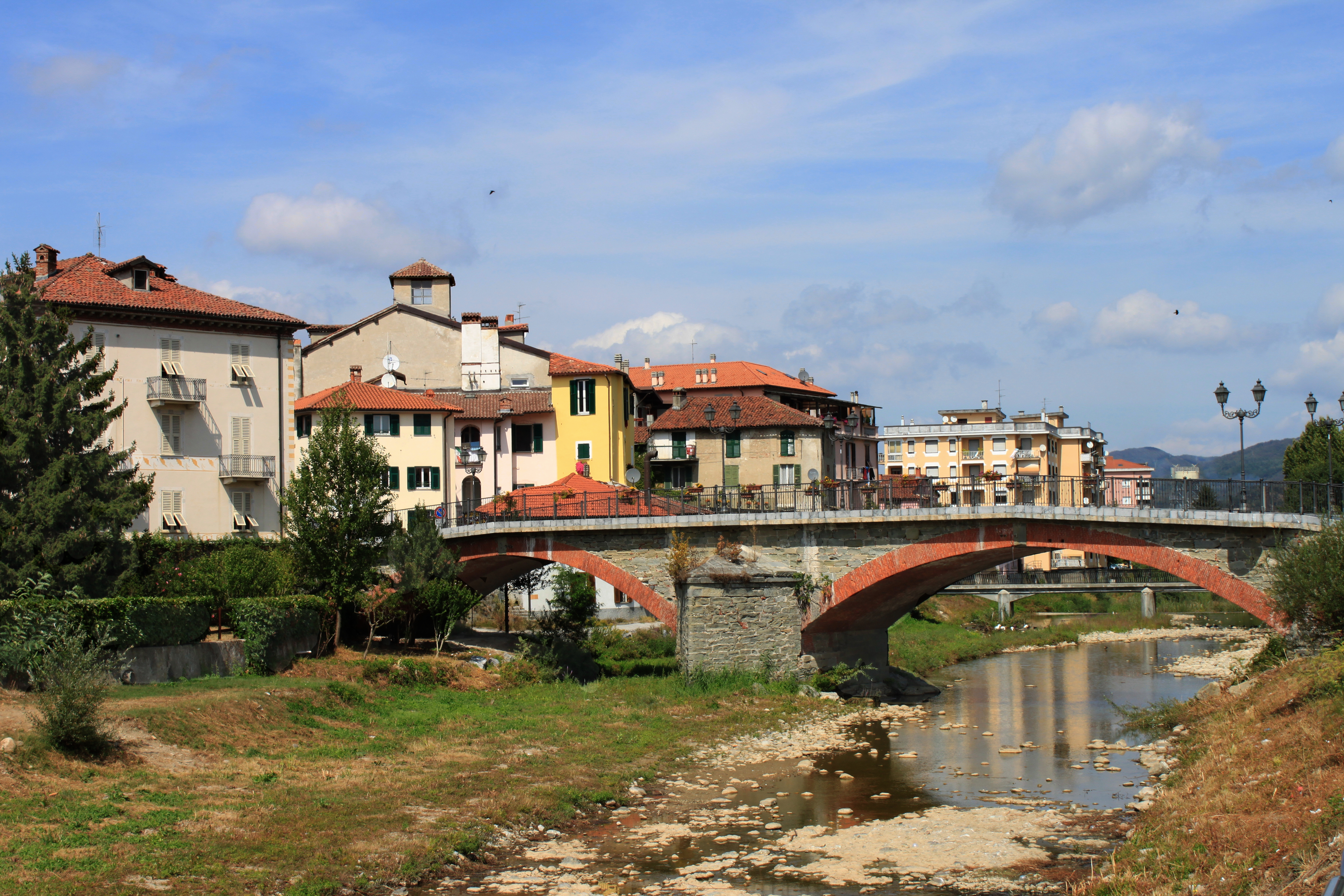

- Coat of arms

- Location within Italy Location within Liguria
- Coordinates: 44°22′N 8°17′E
- Country: Italy
- Region: Liguria
- Province: Savona (SV)
- Frazioni: Vispa

Government
  - Mayor: Franco Bologna

Area
  - Total: 10.4 km^{2} (4.0 sq mi)

Population (31 December 2008)
  - Total: 5,688
  - Density: 547/km^{2} (1,420/sq mi)
- Demonym: Carcaresi
- Time zone: UTC+1 (CET)
  - Summer (DST): UTC+2 (CEST)
- Postal code: 17043
- Dialing code: 019

Carcare (Italian: [ˈkarkare]; Ligurian: Carcæ; Piedmontese: Cärcre, locally Corcre) is a comune (municipality) in the Province of Savona in the Italian region Liguria, located about 50 kilometres (31 mi) west of Genoa and about 20 kilometres (12 mi) northwest of Savona.

Carcare borders the following municipalities: Altare, Cairo Montenotte, Cosseria, Mallare, Pallare, and Plodio.

The church of St. John the Baptist houses a 17th-century crucifix by Anton Maria Maragliano. Of the 16th-century castle, only ruins remain today. Singer-songwriter Annalisa hails from Carcare.
