= Celle Ligure =

- Comune
- Comune di Celle Ligure
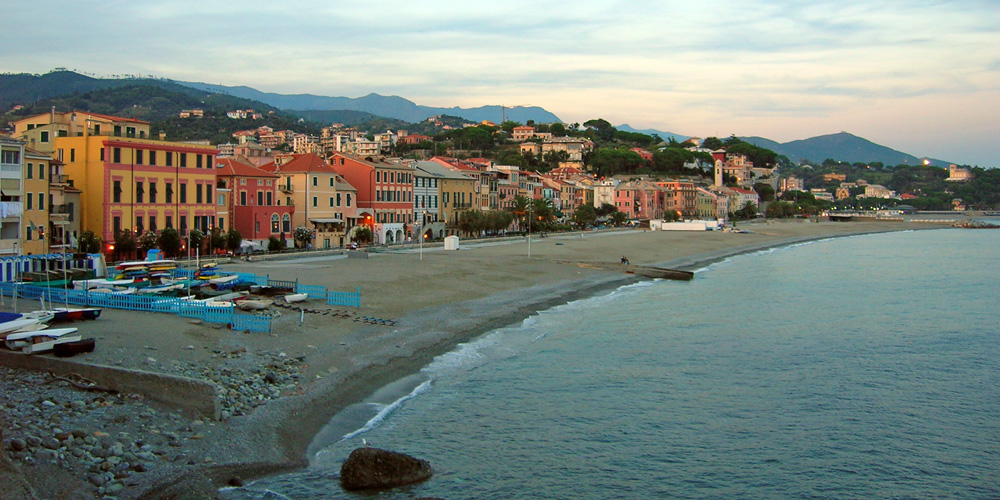
- Celle Ligure

- Flag Coat of arms

- Location within Italy Location within Liguria
- Coordinates: 44°21′N 8°33′E
- Country: Italy
- Region: Liguria
- Province: Savona (SV)

Government
  - Mayor: Caterina Mordeglia

Area
  - Total: 9.6 km^{2} (3.7 sq mi)

Population (31 December 2011)
  - Total: 5,342
  - Density: 560/km^{2} (1,400/sq mi)
- Demonym: Cellesi or Cellaschi
- Time zone: UTC+1 (CET)
  - Summer (DST): UTC+2 (CEST)
- Postal code: 17015
- Dialing code: 019
- Website: www.comune.celle.sv.it

Celle Ligure (Ligurian: Çelle) is a comune (municipality) in the Province of Savona in the Italian region Liguria, located about 30 kilometres (19 miles) west of Genoa and about 8 kilometres (5 miles) northeast of Savona.

It borders the comuni of: Albisola Superiore, Stella, and Varazze. It is one of I Borghi più belli d'Italia ("The most beautiful villages of Italy").

== Main sights ==
- Parish church of San Michele Arcangelo (1645). It houses a polyptych by Perin del Vaga from 1535
- Pseudo-Romanesque church of Nostra Signora della Consolazione (18th century)
- Bregalla Tower (11th through 16th centuries)

== International relations ==
Celle Ligure is twinned with:

- Celle, Germany

== People ==
Francesco della Rovere, later Pope Sixtus IV, was born in Celle in 1414.
