= Spigno Monferrato =

- Comune
- Comune di Spigno Monferrato
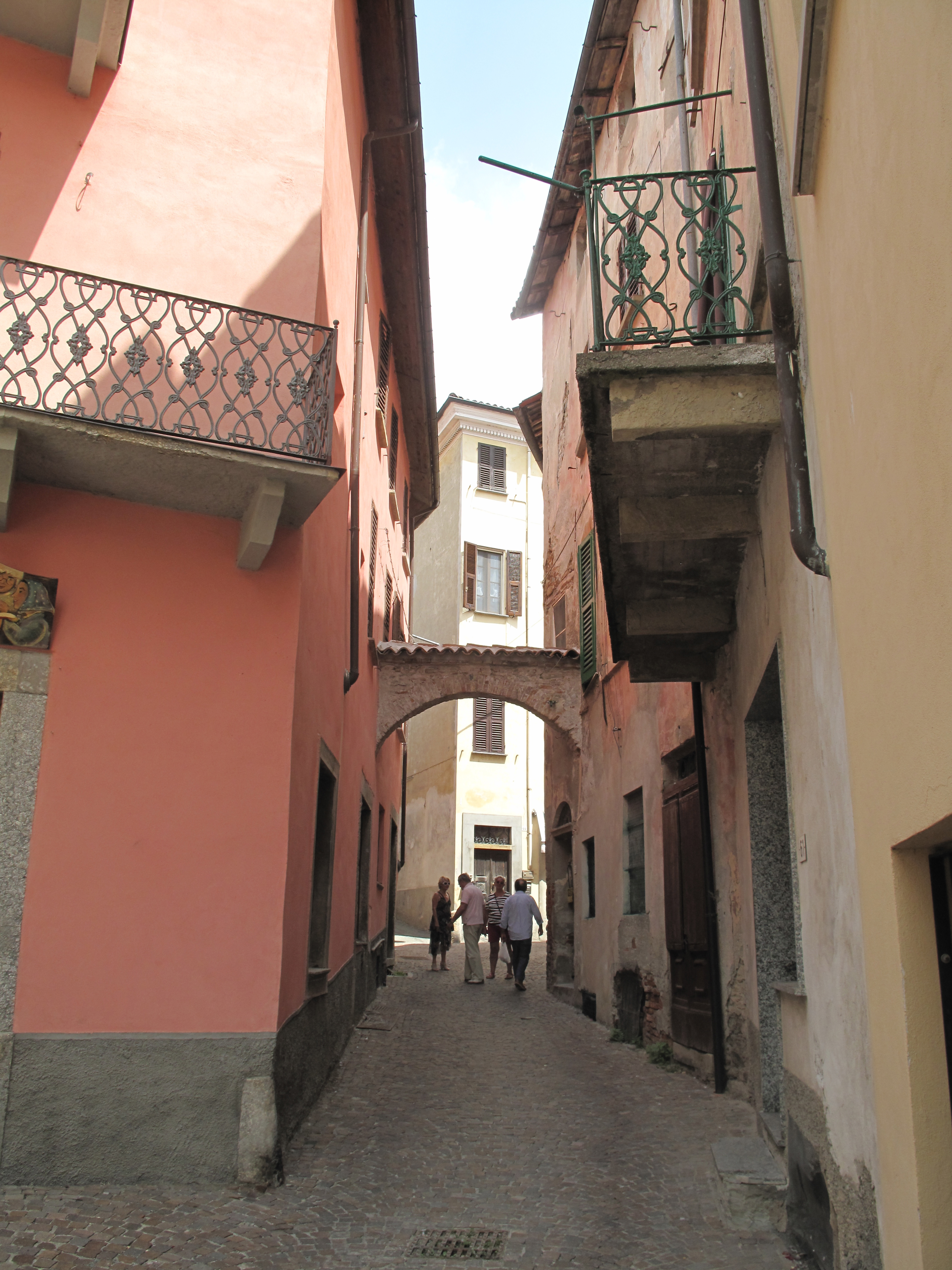

- Coat of arms

- Location within Italy Location within Piedmont
- Coordinates: 44°32′39″N 8°20′6″E
- Country: Italy
- Region: Piedmont
- Province: Alessandria (AL)
- Frazioni: Montaldo, Rocchetta, Squaneto, Turpino.

Government
  - Mayor: Antonio Visconti

Area
  - Total: 54.86 km^{2} (21.18 sq mi)
- Elevation: 217 m (712 ft)

Population (30 November 2017)
  - Total: 1,015
  - Density: 18.50/km^{2} (47.92/sq mi)
- Demonym: Spignesi
- Time zone: UTC+1 (CET)
  - Summer (DST): UTC+2 (CEST)
- Postal code: 15018
- Dialing code: 0144
- Patron saint: St. Ambrose
- Saint day: 7 December
- Website: Official website

Spigno Monferrato is a comune (municipality) in the Province of Alessandria in the Italian region of Piedmont, located about 80 kilometres (50 mi) southeast of Turin and about 45 kilometres (28 mi) southwest of Alessandria.

== History ==
The lake of S. Lorenzo

The land of Spigno was owned by the Count of Sales, an illegitimate brother of Victor Amadeus II of Savoy. It had previously been a fiefdom of the Holy Roman Empire. In 1730 he married morganatically to Anna Canalis di Cumiana, who was created the Marchioness of Spigno in her own right.
