= Albisola Superiore =

- Comune
- Città di Albisola Superiore
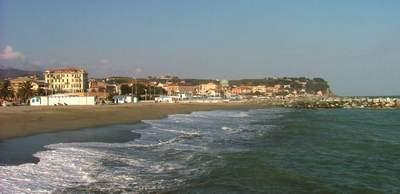

- Coat of arms

- Location of Albisola Superiore in Italy Albisola Superiore (Liguria)
- Coordinates: 44°20′22″N 8°31′37″E
- Country: Italy
- Region: Liguria
- Province: Savona (SV)
- Frazioni: Ellera, Albisola Capo

Government
  - Mayor: Maurizio Garbarini

Area
  - Total: 29.0 km^{2} (11.2 sq mi)
- Elevation: 10 m (33 ft)

Population (30 April 2017)
  - Total: 10,041
  - Density: 346/km^{2} (897/sq mi)
- Demonym: Albisolesi
- Time zone: UTC+1 (CET)
  - Summer (DST): UTC+2 (CEST)
- Postal code: 17013
- Dialing code: 019
- Patron saint: St. Nicholas of Bari
- Saint day: December 6
- Website: Official website

Albisola Superiore (Genoese: d'äto d'Arbisseua) is a comune (municipality) in the Province of Savona in the Italian region Liguria, located about 35 kilometres (22 mi) southwest of Genoa and about 5 kilometres (3 mi) northeast of Savona.

== Main sights ==
- Medieval castle
- Sanctuary of Madonna della Pace (Madonna of the Peace), on the road towards Stella.
- Villa Gavotti.

== Notable people ==
- Giuliano della Rovere, Pope Julius II
- Davide Biale, bassist
