= Sassello =

- Comune
- Comune di Sassello
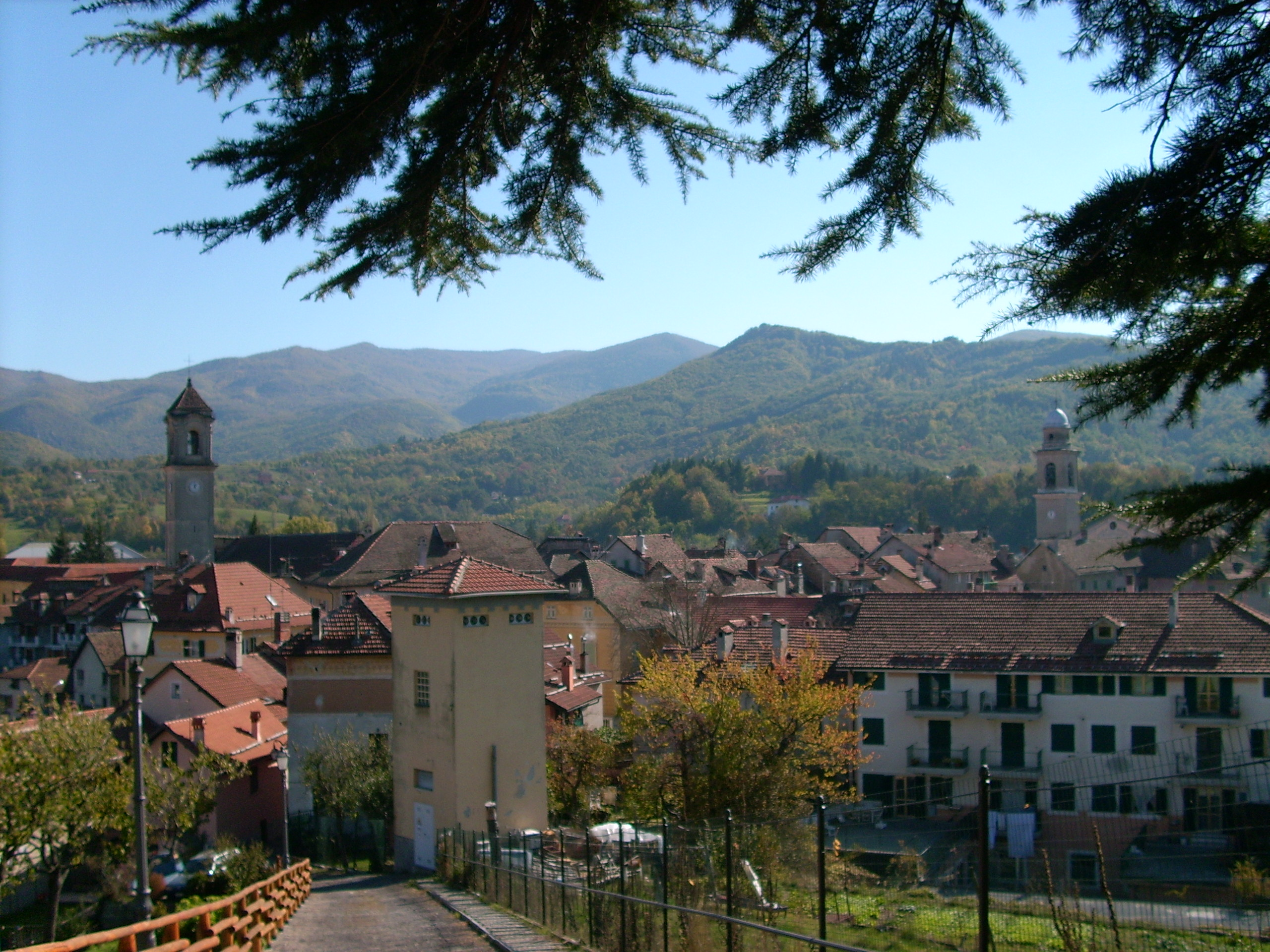

- Flag Coat of arms

- Location within Italy Location within Liguria
- Coordinates: 44°29′N 8°29′E
- Country: Italy
- Region: Liguria
- Province: Savona (SV)
- Frazioni: Badani, Maddalena, Pratovallarino, Palo, Alberola, Pianpaludo

Government
  - Mayor: Daniele Buschiazzo

Area
  - Total: 100.45 km^{2} (38.78 sq mi)
- Elevation: 405 m (1,329 ft)

Population (31 December 2015)
  - Total: 1,777
  - Density: 17.69/km^{2} (45.82/sq mi)
- Demonym: Sassellesi
- Time zone: UTC+1 (CET)
  - Summer (DST): UTC+2 (CEST)
- Postal code: 17046
- Dialing code: 019
- Website: Official website

Sassello (Ligurian: Sascello; locally Sascê) is a comune (municipality) in the Province of Savona in the Italian region Liguria, located about 58 kilometres (36 mi) west of Genoa and about 26 kilometres (16 mi) north of Savona in the northern side of the Ligurian Apennines. It is the birthplace of Blessed Chiara Badano.

Part of Sassello's territory lies within the boundaries of the Parco naturale regionale del Beigua.

== History ==
Little is known of pre-historic and even medieval events before 1000 AD, although the area has certainly been visited - if not inhabited - by stone age humans, as evidenced by tools and weapons found locally. Livy reports the presence of the Statielli, a Ligurian tribe, not far from Sassello in present-day Acqui Terme. Sassello is first mentioned in 967 AD in an Imperial bull which attached it to the Marquesate of Aleram. Later on, it belonged to Bonifacio del Vasto, the Del Carretto, Ponzone and Genoese Doria families. Due to its strategical position, it was long contended between the Republic of Genoa and the Marquisate of Montferrat. Genoa acquired it from the Doria family in 1612, whereas in 1672 and 1747 it was occupied - and burnt down - by the Duchy of Savoy. It reintegrated the Republic of Genoa until its annexation to the Kingdom of Sardinia in 1815. After that date, Sassello followed the destiny of Piedmont to become part of the new Italian kingdom in 1861.

From 1570 to 1670 it was the seat of large ironworks which only the widespread use of coal made obsolete.

== Culture ==
The ironworks period represented a golden age for Sassello, whose population rose perhaps to 5,000 people. The urban character of the settlement allowed for the development of a learned élite and a small vernacular literature. A song, still popular today, was composed during the 1747 war as a reaction to the Austro-Piedmontese occupation, carried out by a horde of Croatian mercenaries. It goes:

(vernacular) A ṙa Badia an tei palâzzi l'è rivâ na nija d'Chervâzzi da ṙa Rocca dra Maṙâsca a n'è vgnuggua sta burrâsca.	(EN) In the Abbey and the abodes Of Croatians there were loads Down from the Marasca wall This disgrace would befall
(Popular song of Sassello, ca. 1748)

Also in vernacular, Abbot Gio Lorenzo Federico Gavotti composed Ei quattei stagiugni sascline ("The four seasons of Sassello"). "Sassello" is another much longer poem that Gavotti composed together with his friend B. Zunini. It revolves around the local costumes during the first decades of the 1800s. It was written in standard Italian with only a few verses in vernacular. Jacopo Perrando (1853-1917), author of a fairy tale "Scisciacco" is also worth mentioning.

== Economy ==
After the collapse of the ironworks and the annexation to the Kingdom of Sardinia, an impoverished population drew its subsistence from agriculture and forestry. Strong ties with Genoa meant the penetration of a dense trading network. With the rise of the Genoese bourgeoisie, Sassello became a tourist destination, as rich summer dwellings were built. Today, tourism and confectionery industry are its main economic resources. The recent inclusion of part of its territory within the Regional Park of Mount Beigua opens new perspectives in this sense.

== Twin towns ==
Sassello is twinned with:

- Les Alqueries, Spain, since 2002

== See also ==
- Monte Beigua
- Lago dell'Antenna
