= Roman Catholic Diocese of Noli =

The Diocese of Noli (Latin: Dioecesis Naulensis) was a Roman Catholic diocese located in the town of Noli of Liguria, Italy, in the Province of Savona. It was established in 1237, on territory which had been taken from the diocese of Savona. In 1820, it was united with the Diocese of Savona to form the Diocese of Savona e Noli.

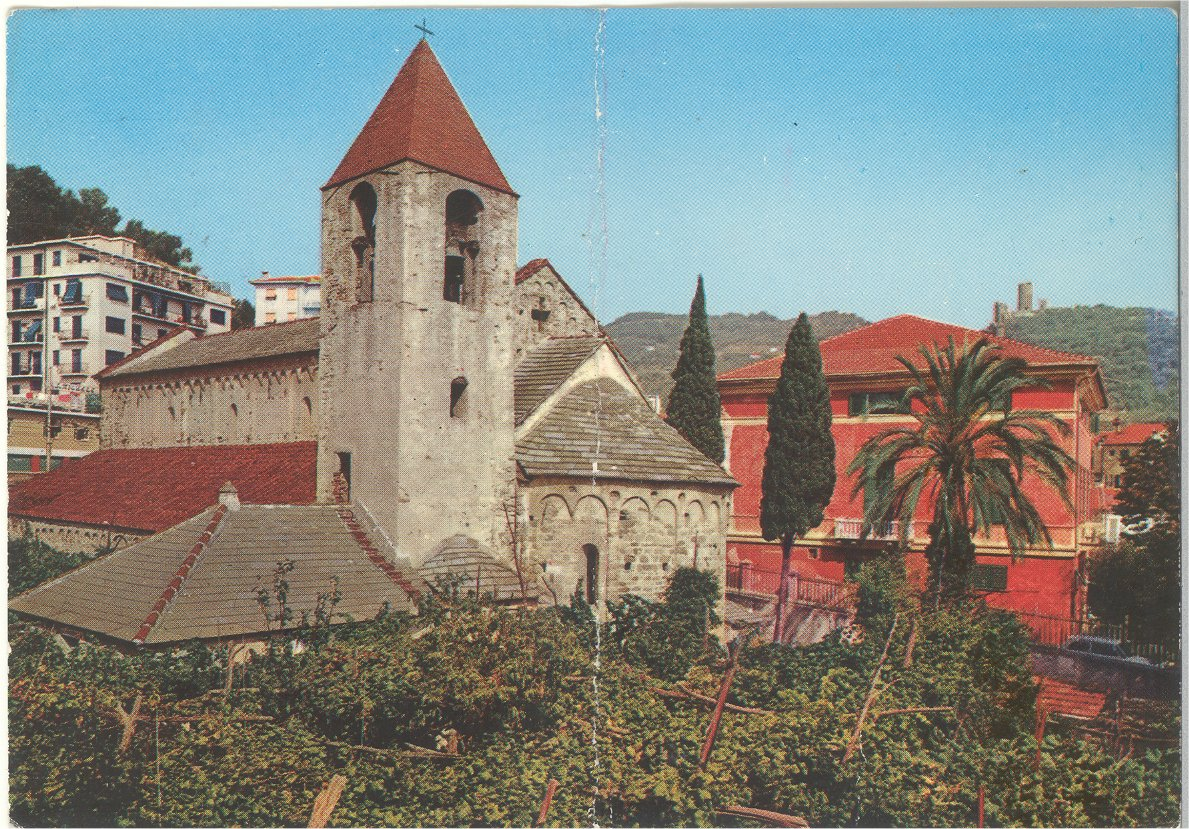
San Paragorio, Noli

The diocese was suppressed in 1986.

== History ==
In 1239, Cardinal Giacomo da Pecorara, suburbicarian Bishop of Palestrina, was sent by Pope Gregory IX to France as papal legate, to deal with the Albigensian heresy. When he stopped in Savona, he removed the parish of Noli from the diocese of Savona with papal authorization, and established a new diocese of Noli. He assigned it as a suffragan of the archdiocese of Genoa, which had been established by Pope Innocent II in 1133, even though Savona remained a suffragan of the diocese of Milan. On 25 April 1249, Pope Innocent IV confirmed the city status of Noli, and the cathedral status of S. Paragorius.

The cathedral was served and administered by a corporation called the Chapter, which, at Noli, was composed of one dignity (the Archpriest) and five canons. This arrangement continued through the end of the 18th century. When Noli was joined with Savona in 1820, the Chapter of Noli consisted of the Archpriest, the Dean, the Theologus, the Penitentiary, and four other canons.

The first bishop of Noli was Guglielmo Contardi, who had already been Bishop-elect of Brugnato, a suffragan of the archdiocese of Genoa, since 1230. In fact, Guglielmo was bishop-elect of both dioceses, aeque personaliter, from 1239 to 1245, when the two dioceses were separated by order of Pope Innocent IV. On 11 August 1247, Pope Innocent IV wrote to the archbishop of Genoa, informing him that the people of Noli were demanding a bishop of their own. Bishop-elect Guglielmo had already ceased to govern Noli, but had been appointed administrator in spiritual and temporal matters. The pope ordered the archbishop to install Frater Philippus, O.P., as their procurator. On 20 April 1249, Pope Innocent signed a bull directed to the bishop of Noli, "in sacra Petri", taking the Church of Saint Paragorius of Noli under the protection of S. Peter and himself, and confirming that Noli was a suffragan of the archdiocese of Genoa. On 6 February 1253, Pope Innocent wrote to the bishop of Noli, recalling that the monastery of S. Eugenius on the island of Bergaggi, which should have been handed over to the diocese of Noli, and which the archbishop of Genoa had ordered to be placed in the possession of the provost of Genoa, who was then bishop-elect of Noli (Philippus, O.P.), was being held by the podestà, council, and commune of Genoa, who were excluding all occupiers. The pope had ordered the monastery and island be restored to the bishop of Noli. In passing, the pope noted that Philippus' successor was deceased.

After his installation as bishop, Bishop Leonardo Trucco (1572–1587) realized that, after serving as Noli's cathedral for 330 years, San Paragorio was no longer adequate for the needs of the bishop and the diocese. It was outside the walls of the town and inconvenient of access. Bishop Trucco therefore wrote to Pope Gregory XIII, proposing that the episcopal seat be moved inside the city, to the church of S. Pietro. In an apostolic letter dated 22 October 1572, the pope granted the bishop's petition and authorized the transfer.

=== Joining of neighbors ===
In 1710, the city of Noli had a population of c. 1100. In 1737, the population of the city had risen to c. 1300 persons.

On 8 December 1820, with the bull "Dominici Gregis", Pope Pius VII joined the diocese of Savona and the diocese of Noli in one bishop, aeque personaliter under the title "Savonensis et Naulensis." He cited as justification the small number of faithful and the diocese of Noli's inadequate income.

=== Diocesan reorganization of 1986 ===
The Second Vatican Council (1962–1965), in order to ensure that all Catholics received proper spiritual attention, decreed the reorganization of the diocesan structure of Italy and the consolidation of small and struggling dioceses. It also recommended the abolition of anomalous units such as exempt territorial prelatures.

On 18 February 1984, the Vatican and the Italian State signed a new and revised concordat. Based on the revisions, a set of Normae was issued on 15 November 1984, which was accompanied in the next year, on 3 June 1985, by enabling legislation. According to the agreement, the practice of having one bishop govern two separate dioceses at the same time, aeque personaliter, was abolished. Instead, the Vatican continued consultations which had begun under Pope John XXIII for the merging of small dioceses, especially those with personnel and financial problems, into one combined diocese.

On 30 September 1986, Pope John Paul II ordered that the dioceses of Savona and Noli be merged into one diocese with one bishop, with the Latin title "Dioecesis Savonensis-Naulensis". The seat of the diocese was to be in Savona, whose cathedral was to serve as the cathedral of the merged diocese. The cathedral in Noli was to have the honorary title of "co-cathedral"; the Chapter of Noli was to be a Capitulum Concathedralis. There was to be only one diocesan Tribunal, in Savona, and likewise one seminary, one College of Consultors, and one Priests' Council. The territory of the new diocese was to include the territory of the suppressed diocese. The new diocese was a suffragan of the archdiocese of Genoa.

== Bishops of Noli ==
Erected: 1239
Latin Name: Naulensis

=== from 1239 to 1502 ===
- Guglielmo (1239–1245) Bishop-elect
- Philippus, O.P. (1247– ? )
- Anonymous (dead before 6 February 1253)
- Pastor (attested 1263)
- Ugolinus (attested 1292)
- Sinibaldus (1317– ? )
- Theodescus Spinola, O.P. (1328–1345 ?)
- Amadeus d'Alba (1346–1360 ? )
- Luchino di Guidobono, O.F.M. (21 July 1360 – 1396)
- Corrado da Cloaco (13 September 1396 - ? ) Roman Obedience
- Leonardo da Felizzano, O.P. (4 November 1405 - ?) Avignon Obedience
- Francesco (22 January 1406 - ?) Avignon Obedience
- Marco (23 March 1406 - after 1409) Roman Obedience
- Giovanni (attested 1414)
- Marco Vigerio, O.Min. (attested 1437)
- Giorgio Fieschi (Flisco) (1447–1448 Resigned) in commendam
- Paolo Giustiniani (1460–1485 Died)
- Domenico Vaccari (1485–1502)

=== from 1502 to 1820 ===
Galeozzo della Rovere (1502–1503) Administrator

- Lorenzo Cibo (1503) Administrator
- Antonio Ferrero (1504)
- Giovanni Vincenzo Foderato (1505–1506)
- Vincenzo Boverio (1506–1519)
- Vincenzo d'Aste (1525–1534)
- Girolamo Doria (1534–1549 Resigned)
- Massimiliano Doria (1549–1572)
- Leonardo Truchi (Trucco) (1572–1587)
- Timoteo Berardi, O. Carm. (1587–1616)
- Angelo Mascardi (1616–1645)
- Stefano Martini (1646–1687)
- Giacomo Porrata (1687–1699)
- Paolo Andrea Borelli, B. (1700–1710)
- Giuseppe Saoli Bargagli, C.R.M. (1710–1712)
- Marco Giacinto Gandolfo (1713–1737)
- Costantino Serra, C.R.S. (1737–1746)
- Antonio Maria Arduini, O.F.M. Conv. (1746–1777)
- Benedetto Solari, O.P. (1778–1814 Died)

Sede vacante (1814-1820)

Michele Terrizzano (1814–1819?) Vicar Capitular
Vincenzo Maria Maggiolo (1819–1820) Administrator

25 November 1820: The diocese of Noli was united with the Diocese of Savona to form the Diocese of Savona e Noli

== See also ==
- Diocese of Savona-Noli
- List of Catholic dioceses in Italy

== Sources ==
=== Episcopal lists ===
- Gams, Pius Bonifatius (1873). Series episcoporum Ecclesiae catholicae (in Latin). Ratisbon: Typis et Sumptibus Georgii Josephi Manz. (Use with caution; obsolete)
- Eubel, Conradus, ed. (1913). Hierarchia catholica (in Latin). Vol. I (second ed.). Münster: Libreria Regensbergiana.
- Eubel, Conradus, ed. (1914). Hierarchia catholica (in Latin). Vol. II (second ed.). Münster: Libreria Regensbergiana.
- Eubel, Conradus; Gulik, Guilelmus (1923). Hierarchia catholica (in Latin). Vol. III (second ed.). Münster: Libreria Regensbergiana.
- Gauchat, Patritius (Patrice) (1935). Hierarchia catholica (in Latin). Vol. IV (1592-1667). Münster: Libraria Regensbergiana.
- Ritzler, Remigius; Sefrin, Pirminus (1952). Hierarchia catholica medii et recentis aevi (in Latin). Vol. V (1667-1730). Patavii: Messagero di S. Antonio.
- Ritzler, Remigius; Sefrin, Pirminus (1958). Hierarchia catholica medii et recentis aevi (in Latin). Vol. VI (1730-1799). Patavii: Messagero di S. Antonio.
- Ritzler, Remigius; Sefrin, Pirminus (1968). Hierarchia Catholica medii et recentioris aevi (in Latin). Vol. VII (1800–1846). Monasterii: Libreria Regensburgiana.

=== Studies ===
- Cappelletti, Giuseppe (1857). Le chiese d'Italia della loro origine sino ai nostri giorni (in Italian). Vol. decimoterzo (13). Venezia: Giuseppe Antonelli.
- Kehr, Paul Fridolin, Italia Pontificia, Vol. VI: Liguria sive Provincia Mediolanensis (Berlin: Weidemann), pp. 353–357. (in Latin).
- Semeria, Giovanni Battista (1843). Secoli cristiani della Liguria, ossia, Storia della metropolitana di Genova, delle diocesi di Sarzana, di Brugnato, Savona, Noli, Albegna e Ventimiglia (in Italian). Vol. II. Torino: Tip. Chirio e Mina. pp. 185–315, 319–341.
- Ughelli, Ferdinando; Coleti, Niccolò (1719). Italia sacra, sive De episcopis Italiæ, et insularum adjacentium (in Latin). Vol. 4 (Tomus Quartus). Venezia: apud Sebastianum Coleti.
- Verzellino, Giovanni Vincenzo (1890), Delle memorie particolari e specialmente degli nomini illustri della città di Savona (in Italian) Savona: D. Bertolotto, 1890.
