= Lorenzo Cybo de Mari =

Italian Catholic cardinal

- Cardinal-Bishop of Palestrina
- Church: Catholic Church
- See: Palestrina
- In office: 29 November 1503 – 21 December 1503
- Predecessor: Girolamo Basso della Rovere
- Successor: Antonio Pallavicini Gentili
- Other posts: Administrator of Noli (1503); Cardinal-Priest of San Marco (1491-1503); Administrator of Vannes (1490-1503)
- Previous posts: Archbishop of Benevento (1485-1503); Cardinal-Bishop of Albano (1501-1503); Cardinal-Priest of Santa Cecilia (1497-1500); Cardinal-Priest of Santa Susanna (1489-1491)

Orders
- Consecration: 28 March 1486 by Pope Innocent VIII
- Created cardinal: 9 March 1489 by Pope Innocent VIII

Personal details
- Born: 1450/1451 Genoa, Republic of Genoa
- Died: 21 December 1503 (aged 51-53)

Lorenzo Cybo de Mari (c. 1450/1451 – 21 December 1503) was an Italian Catholic cardinal. He was archbishop of Benevento. As titular holder of the Basilica of Saint Mark in Rome, he is remembered today as the builder of the Appartamento Cibo a series of seven rooms within the north wing of the Palazzo Venezia.

== Biography ==
Born in Genoa, de Mari was an illegitimate child. According to some sources his paternity was attributed to Domenico de Mari, patrician of Genoa, brother of Teodorina and uncle of Maurizio Cybo, although another source states Maurizio (d. April 1491) was his father.

He was made cardinal on 9 March 1489 by his uncle, Pope Innocent VIII. He built the first Cybo Chapel in the Basilica of Santa Maria del Popolo in the beginning of the 16th century which was decorated by the frescos of Pinturicchio and the works of Andrea Bregno but was destroyed by Alderano Cybo in 1682-87.

He also was bishop of Vannes in France, bishop of Palestrina (1493), bishop of Albano (1501) and bishop of Noli (1502).

== Sources ==
- Williams, George L. (1998). Papal Genealogy: The Families and Descendants of the Popes. McFarland & Co. Inc.
- Wright, Alison (2005). The Pollaiuolo Brothers: The Arts of Florence and Rome. Yale University Press.
