= Republic of Noli =

Italian maritime republic (1192–1797)

Republic of Noli Repubblica di Noli (Italian) Repubbrica de Nöi (Ligurian)
- 1192–1797
- Flag Coat of arms

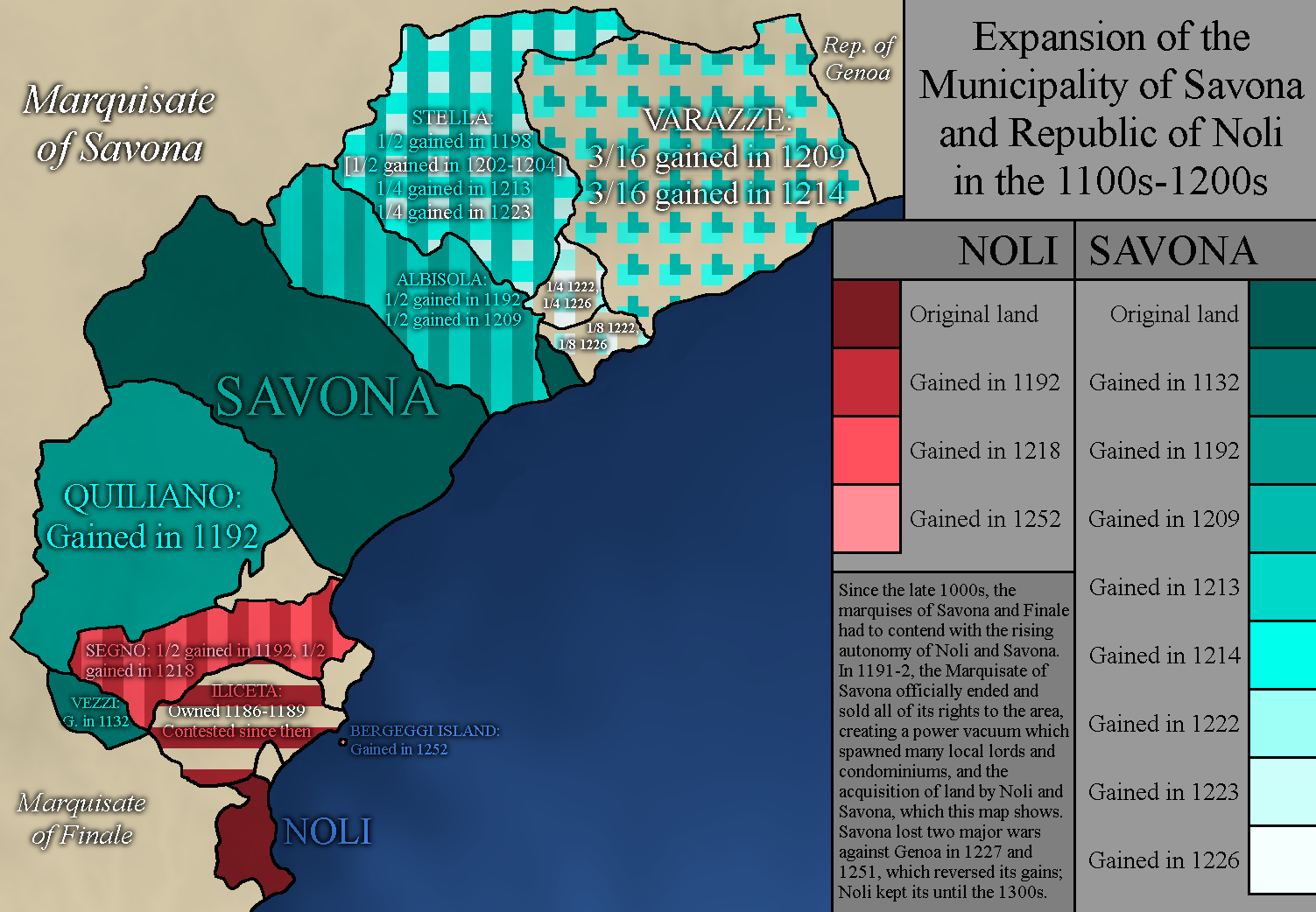
- Location of the Republic of Noli

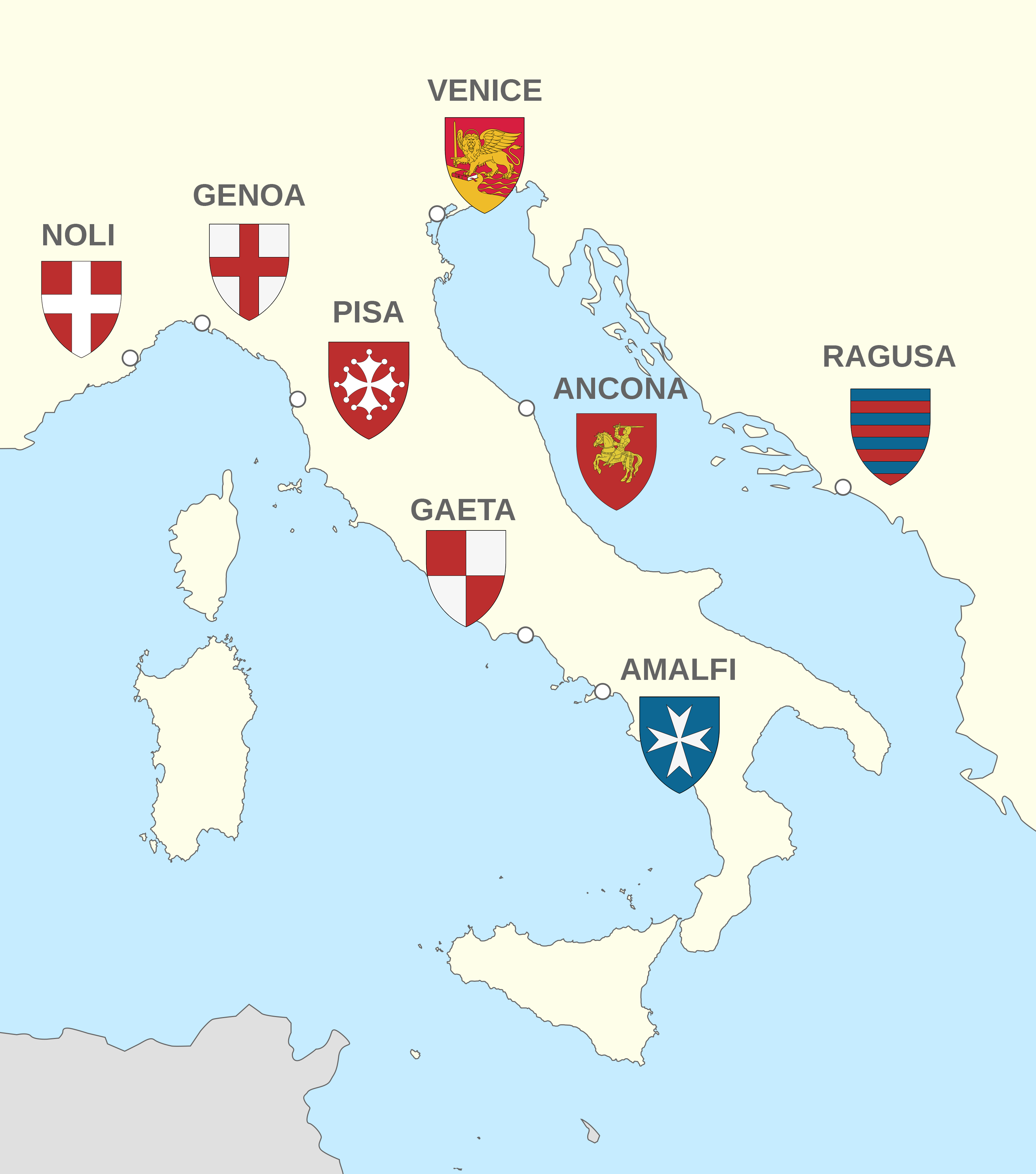
- Location of Noli in Italy, depicted along with other maritime republics
- Status: De facto protectorate of the Republic of Genoa from 1202 to 1797
- Capital: Noli
- Common languages: Ligurian; Latin; Italian
- Religion: Roman Catholic
- Government: Aristocratic oligarchic republic (City-state)
- Podestà as Head of state
- Historical era: Middle Age; Renaissance; Early Modern Age
  - Established through decree by Henry VI, Holy Roman Emperor: 7 August 1192
  - Annexation by the Ligurian Republic: 2 December 1797

Population
  - Estimate: 1,500 in the 18th century
Preceded by	Succeeded by
Marquisate of Finale	Ligurian Republic
- Today part of: Italy

The Republic of Noli (Italian: Repubblica di Noli; Ligurian: Repubbrica de Nöi) was an Italian maritime republic in Western Europe that was centred on the city of Noli, in Liguria, and existed from 1192 to 1797. The area is now in the province of Savona, Italy. To protect itself from possible attacks and invasions by Savona and Marquisate of Finale, Noli allied in 1202 with the Republic of Genoa in a sort of protectorate, in fact, documents of the time show that the relationship was equal and not one of submission. The alliance allowed the Republic of Noli to have such growing importance that in 1239, a diocese was established there by Pope Gregory IX.

== History ==
The Republic of Noli was founded in 1192. After 10 years of existence, the small maritime republic allied itself with the larger and more powerful neighbouring Genoese Republic, which gave Noli the status of a Genoese protectorate until its dissolution in 1797. Throughout its history Noli was ruled by a Podestà. It survived for 605 years before it was annexed by Napoleon in 1797.

== Economy ==
Despite its small size, Noli's good shipyard and harbour allowed it to become a commercial power. It had good trade relations with Genoa, as it had to pay one penny to be allowed to trade in Genoa, whereas the Spanish had to pay 60 pennies to be allowed to trade.

== Military ==
Noli's efficient shipyard allowed them to become somewhat of a naval power, despite its small size. The alliance with Genoa afforded it much protection, especially as Genoa used Noli's port to shelter their ships.

It is known that during a conflict with Savona, Noli sacked the town of Spotorno, which was owned by them, in 1227.

== Foreign relations ==
In 1202, Noli was threatened by the County of Savona. In response, Noli formed a confederation with the powerful Republic of Genoa. Noli kept this alliance until they were dissolved in 1797.

== Flag ==
The flag of Noli was first created in the 13th century, with a white cross and a red background, the exact opposite of Genoa's flag. Many of the merchant ships of Noli chose to fly under the Genoese flag, as it commanded much more respect.

== Religion ==
In 1239, the Pope appointed a bishop to Noli.

== Sources ==
- Epstein, Steven A. (2001). Genoa & the Genoese, 958–1528. Chapel Hill: The University of North Carolina Press. ISBN 9780807849927.
- Facaros, Dana; Pauls, Michael (2006). Italian Riviera & Piemonte. London: Cadogan Guides. ISBN 9781860113086.
- Finley, Amy (2001). Adventure guide the Italian Riviera San Remo, Portofino, Genoa. Edison, New Jersey: Hunter Publishing, Inc. ISBN 9781588435774.
- Whitehouse, Rosie (2016). Liguria. Bradt Travel Guides. ISBN 9781784770105.

== Links ==
- Breschi, Roberto. "Small and Very Small States in Italy that Lasted Beyond 1700 - A Vexillological Survey" (PDF). Flaginstitute.org.
