= Vezzi Portio =

- Comune
- Comune di Vezzi Portio
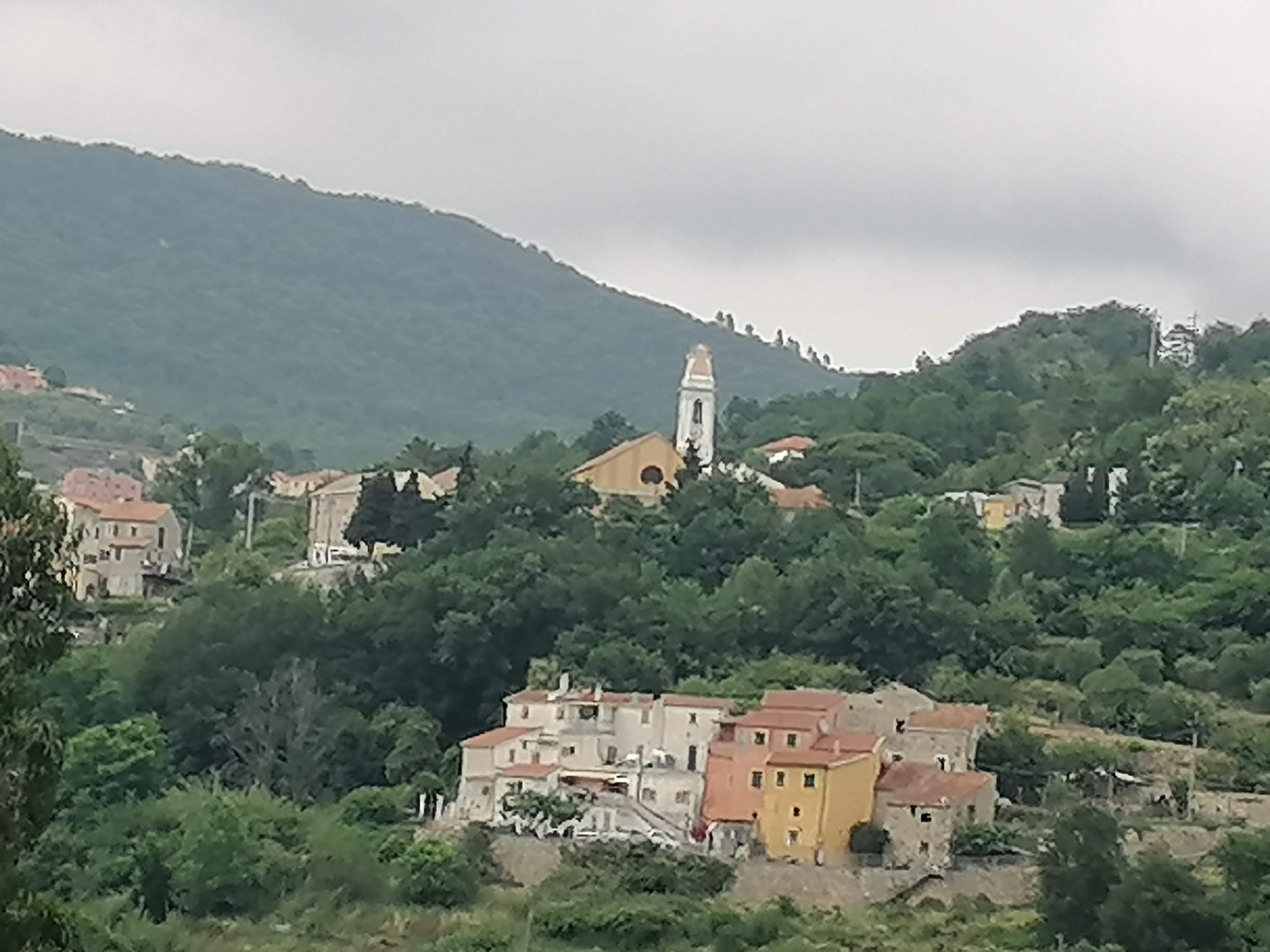

- Coat of arms

- Location within Italy Location within Liguria
- Coordinates: 44°13′N 8°22′E
- Country: Italy
- Region: Liguria
- Province: Savona (SV)

Government
  - Mayor: Germano Barbano

Area
  - Total: 8.76 km^{2} (3.38 sq mi)
- Elevation: 300 m (980 ft)

Population (31 December 2015)
  - Total: 809
  - Density: 92.4/km^{2} (239/sq mi)
- Demonym: Vezzesi
- Time zone: UTC+1 (CET)
  - Summer (DST): UTC+2 (CEST)
- Postal code: 17028
- Dialing code: 019
- Website: Official website

Vezzi Portio (Ligurian: Vessi Portio) is a comune (municipality) in the Province of Savona in the Italian region Liguria, located about 50 kilometres (31 mi) southwest of Genoa and about 13 kilometres (8 mi) southwest of Savona.

Vezzi Portio borders the following municipalities: Finale Ligure, Noli, Orco Feglino, Quiliano, Spotorno, and Vado Ligure.
