= List of historical societies in Italy =

The following is a list of historical societies and similar entities in Italy.

== Organizations ==
- Associazione castanese per la Storia Patria
- Associazione Marsalese di Storia Patria
- Centro Studi Storici di Monforte San Giorgio e del Valdemone
- Consulta Regionale delle Società di Storia Patria siciliane
- Deputazione Abruzzese di Storia Patria
- Deputazione di Storia Patria per il Friuli (in Italian)
- Deputazione di Storia Patria per l'Umbria
- Deputazione di Storia Patria per la Calabria
- Deputazione di Storia Patria per la Lucania
- Deputazione di Storia Patria per la Liguria
- Deputazione di Storia Patria per la Sardegna
- Deputazione di Storia Patria per la Toscana
- Deputazione di Storia Patria per la Venezia Giulia
- Deputazione di Storia Patria per le Provincie Modenesi
- Deputazione di Storia Patria per le Marche
- Deputazione di Storia Patria per le province di Romagna
- Deputazione di Storia Patria per le Province Parmensi
- Deputazione di Storia Patria per le Venezie
- Deputazione Provinciale Ferrarese di Storia Patria
- Deputazione Subalpina di Storia Patria
- Società Agrigentina di Storia Patria
- Società Augustana di Storia Patria
- Società Calatina di Storia Patria e Cultura
- Società Dalmata di Storia Patria
- Società di Storia Patria degli Iblei
- Società di Storia Patria della Sicilia centro-meridionale
- Società di Storia Patria per la Puglia
- Società di Storia Patria per la Sicilia Orientale
- Società Ennese di Storia Patria
- Società Giarrese di Storia Patria e Cultura
- Società Ipparina di Storia Patria
- Società Ispicese di Storia Patria
- Società Istriana di archeologia e storia patria
- Società Ligure di Storia Patria
- Società Messinese di Storia Patria
- Società Milazzese di Storia Patria
- Società Napoletana di Storia Patria (in Italian)
- Società Nissena di Storia Patria
- Società Pattese di Storia Patria
- Società Pavese di Storia Patria
- Società Pistoiese di Storia Patria
- Società Pratese di Storia Patria
- Società Ragusana di Storia Patria
- Società Ramacchese di Storia Patria e Cultura
- Società reggiana di Studi Storici
- Società Romana di Storia Patria
- Società Salernitana di Storia Patria
- Società Santacrocese di Storia Patria
- Società Savonese di Storia Patria
- Società Siciliana di Storia Patria
- Società Siracusana di Storia Patria
- Società Storia Patria di Terra di Lavoro
- Società Storica della Valdelsa
- Società Storica di Terra d'Otranto
- Società Storica Empolese
- Società Storica Lombarda
- Società Storica Novarese
- Società Storica Pisana
- Società Storica Sarda
- Società Storica Subalpina
- Società Storica valtellinese
- Società Toscana per la Storia del Risorgimento italiano
- Società Trapanese di Storia Patria

== Images ==
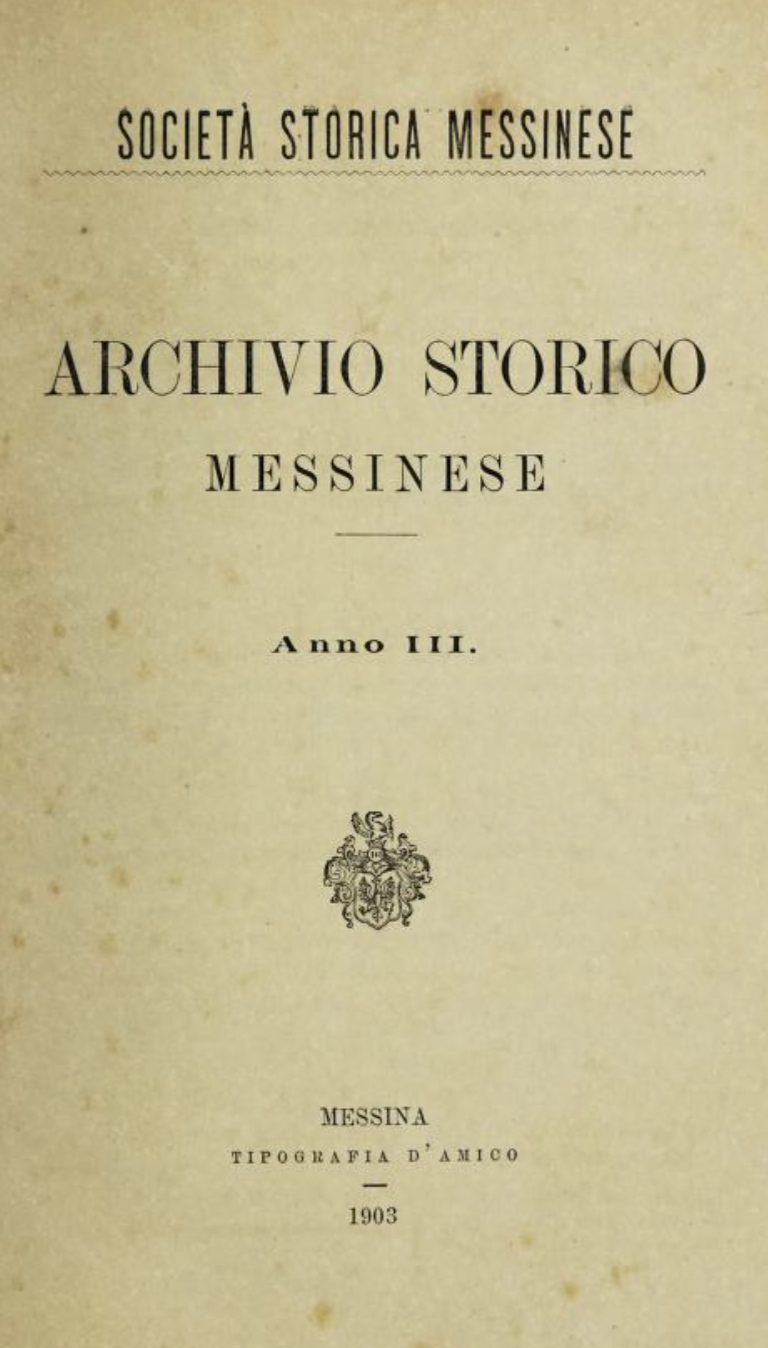
1903 publication of the Società Storica Messinese, Messina, Italy

1937 publication of the Deputazione di Storia Patria per la Liguria, Genoa, Italy

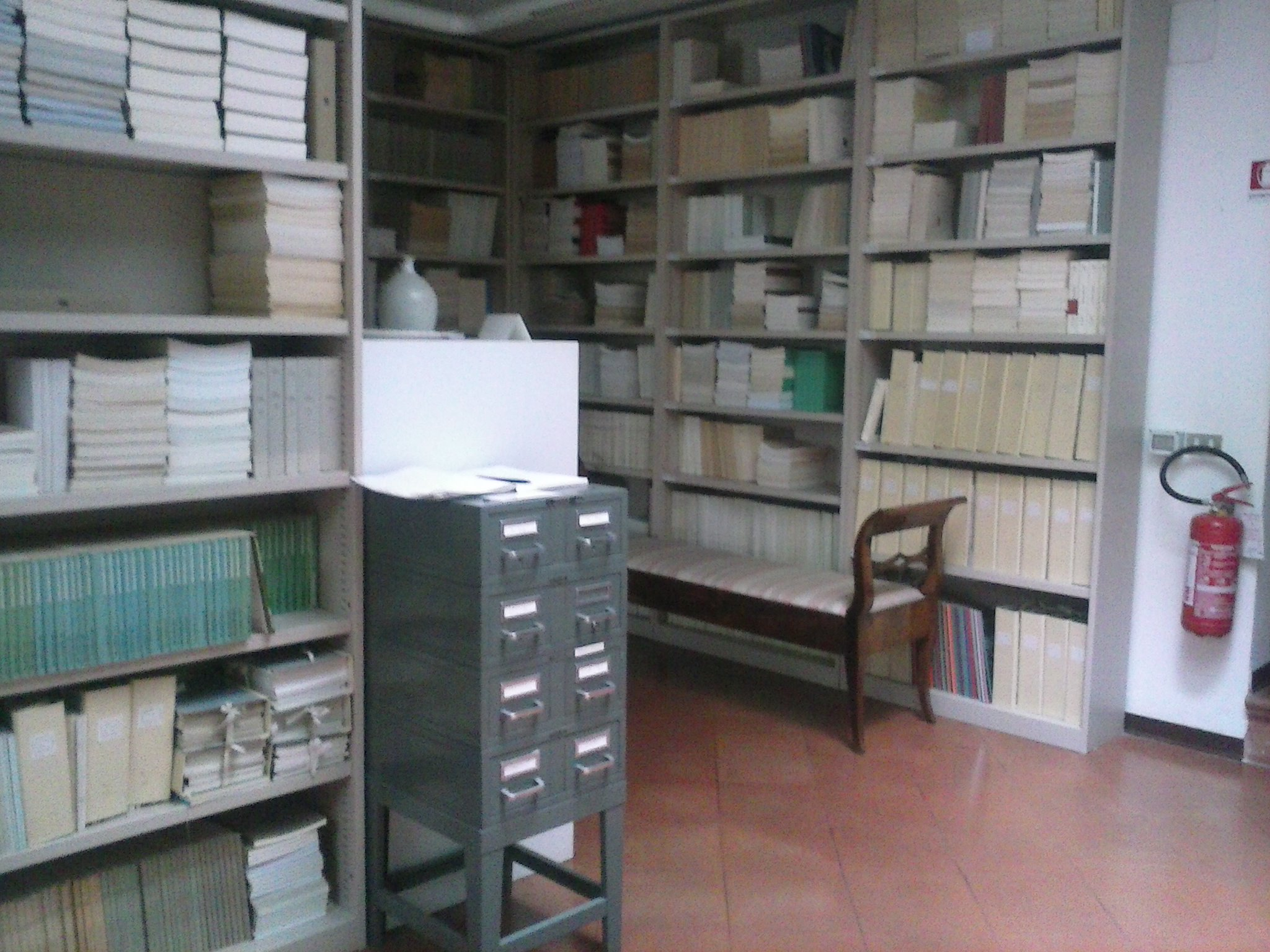
Library of the Deputazione Storia Patria per l'Umbria, Perugia, Italy (photo 2016)

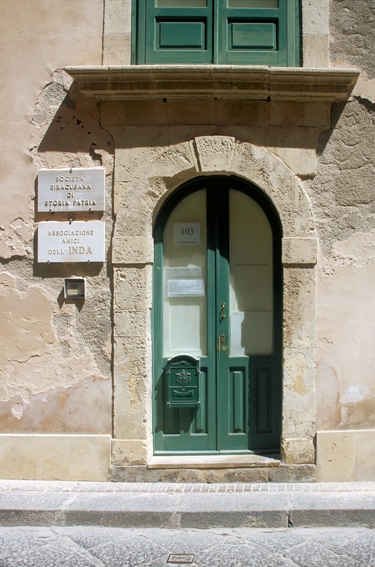
Entrance to building of the Società Siracusana di Storia Patria, Syracuse, Italy (photo 2007)

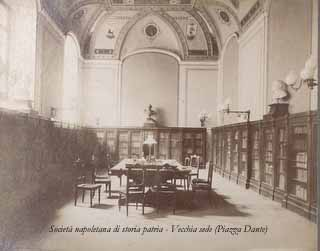
View interior of former headquarters building of the Società Napoletana di Storia Patria, Naples, Italy (photo 19th c.)

== See also ==
- Giunta Centrale per gli Studi Storici (in German); (English: Central Committee for Historical Studies)
- History of Italy
- List of museums in Italy
- List of historical societies
