= Diocese of Savona-Noli =

Roman Catholic diocese in Italy

Coordinates: 44.3079°N 8.4822°E

Diocese of Savona-Noli Dioecesis Savonensis-Naulensis

Catholic
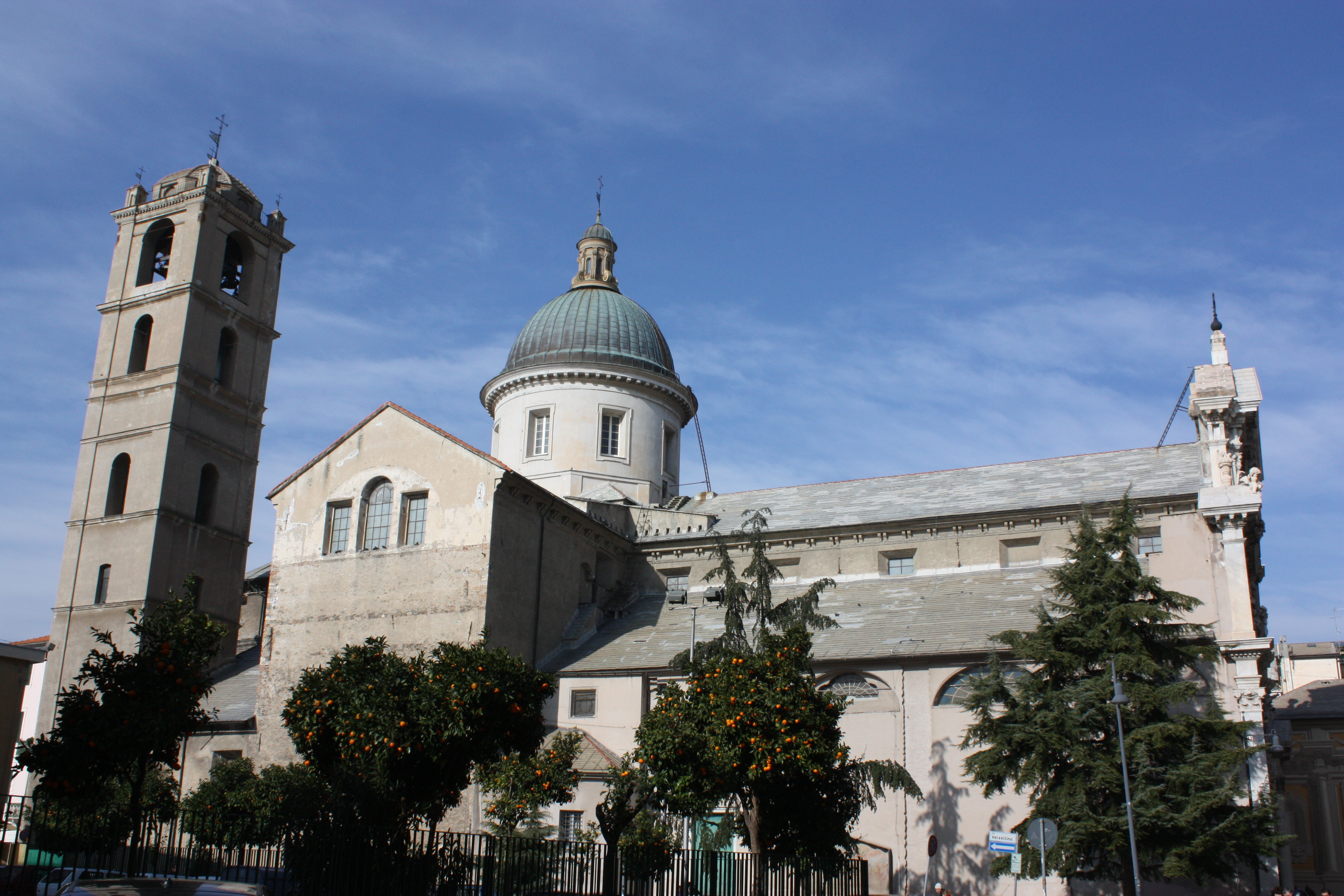
- Savona Cathedral

Location
- Country: Italy
- Ecclesiastical province: Genoa

Statistics
- Area: 359 km^{2} (139 sq mi)
- Population: Total; Catholics: (as of 2023); 149,649; 138,699 (96.6%)
- Parishes: 70

Information
- Denomination: Catholic Church
- Sui iuris church: Latin Church
- Rite: Roman Rite
- Established: 10th Century
- Cathedral: Cattedrale di Nostra Signora Assunta (Savona)
- Co-cathedral: Concattedrale di S. Pietro (Noli)
- Secular priests: 43 (diocesan); 24 (Religious Orders); 11 Permanent Deacons

Current leadership
- Pope: Leo XIV
- Bishop: Calogero Marino
- Metropolitan Archbishop: Marco Tasca, OFM Conv
- Bishops emeritus: Vittorio Lupi

Map

Website
- chiesasavona.it

The Diocese of Savona-Noli (Latin: Dioecesis Savonensis-Naulensis) is a Latin diocese of the Catholic Church in northern Italy. It was historically the Diocese of Savona, from the tenth century. In 1820 the Diocese of Noli was united to the Diocese of Savona. It is a suffragan of the Archdiocese of Genoa.

== History ==
It is claimed, dubiously, that Bishop Bernardus transferred the seat of the diocese of Vado to Savona in 966, and that the action was confirmed by Pope Gregory V in 995. There is no evidence for those statements.

Bishop Guido Lomello attended the Third Lateran Council of Pope Alexander III in March 1179, and subscribed the acts of the council in the company of the other suffragans of Archbishop Algisius of Milan.

In 1230, the bishop of Savona attended a provincial council of Archbishop Henricus of Milan.

=== Diocese of Noli ===
In 1239, Cardinal Giacomo da Pecorara, suburbicarian Bishop of Palestrina, was sent by Pope Gregory IX to France as papal legate, to deal with the Albigensian heresy. When he stopped in Savona, he removed the parish of Noli from the diocese of Savona with papal authorization, and established a new diocese of Noli. He assigned it as a suffragan of the archdiocese of Genoa, even though Savona remained a suffragan of the diocese of Milan. On 25 April 1249, Pope Innocent IV confirmed the city status of Noli, and the cathedral status of S. Paragorius.

=== Cathedrals ===
In 1542, the senate of Genoa, which had control over Savona, ordered the destruction of the cathedral of S. Maria and numerous other buildings to build a wall, a gateway and fortifications. The destruction was completed by 1545. The cathedral Chapter relocated its services to the parish church of S. Paolo. In 1544, Pope Paul III ordered that the church of S. Francesco should be elevated to cathedral status and the adjacent Franciscan convent converted into an episcopal palace. The dilapidated medieval church was destroyed in 1589, to make way for a new cathedral. The new building was completed in 1602 and dedicated by Bishop Pietro Francesco Costa on 24 April 1605 in honor of the Assumption of the body of the Virgin Mary into Heaven (S. Maria Assunta).

=== Consolidation ===
On 8 December 1820, with the bull "Dominici Gregis", Pope Pius VII joined the diocese of Savona and the diocese of Noli in one bishop, aeque personaliter under the title "Savonensis et Naulensis." He cited as justification the small number of faithful and the diocese of Noli's inadequate income.

=== Diocesan Reorganization ===
Following the Second Vatican Council, and in accordance with the norms laid out in the council's decree, Christus Dominus chapter 40, Pope Paul VI ordered consultations among the members of the Congregation of Bishops in the Vatican Curia, the Italian Bishops Conference, and the various dioceses concerned.

On 18 February 1984, the Vatican and the Italian State signed a new and revised concordat. Based on the revisions, a set of Normae was issued on 15 November 1984, which was accompanied in the next year, on 3 June 1985, by enabling legislation. According to the agreement, the practice of having one bishop govern two separate dioceses at the same time, aeque personaliter, was abolished. The Vatican continued consultations which had begun under Pope John XXIII for the merging of small dioceses, especially those with personnel and financial problems, into one combined diocese.

On 30 September 1986, Pope John Paul II ordered that the dioceses of Savona and Noli be merged into one diocese with one bishop, with the Latin title "Dioecesis Savonensis-Naulensis". The seat of the diocese was to be in Savona, whose cathedral was to serve as the cathedral of the merged diocese. The cathedral in Noli was to have the honorary title of "co-cathedral"; the Chapter of Noli was to be a Capitulum Concathedralis. There was to be only one diocesan Tribunal, in Savona, and likewise one seminary, one College of Consultors, and one Priests' Council. The territory of the new diocese was to include the territory of the suppressed diocese. The new diocese was a suffragan of the archdiocese of Genoa.

== Bishops ==
=== to 1200 ===
- Bernardus (attested 992–998)
- Joannes (attested 999–1004)
- Ardeman (attested 1014)
- ? Antellinus (1028)
- ? Brixianus (1046)
- Amicus (attested 1079/1080)
- ? Giordano of Savona (1080)
- Grossolanus (attested 1098–1102)
- Wilielmus (attested 1110–1122)
- Ottaviano of Pavia (c.1122–1128)

...

- Guido
- Ambrosius (c. 1183–1192)
- Bonifacius de Carretto (1193–1199)
- Guala (1199)

=== 1200 to 1400 ===
- Antonius de' Saluzzi (attested 1200–1203)
- Petrus (attested 1206)

...

- Albertus de Novara (1221–1230)
- Henricus (1230–ca. 1239)
- Bonifatius (attested 1247)
- Conradus de Ancisa (attested 1251–1264)
- Rufinus Colombo (c. 1278–1284)

Sede vacante (1284 ?–1289)

- Henricus de Ponzono (1289–1297)
- Gregorius (attested 1297)
- Gualterius (attested 1303)
- Jacobus de Caradengo de Niella (attested 1305, 1311)
- Federicus Cibo (1317–1342)
- Gerardus de Vasconibus de Pergamo, O.E.S.A. (1342–1355)
- Antonius Manfredi de Saluciis (1355–1376)
- Dominicus de Lagneto (1376–1384)
- Antonius de Viale (1386–1394) (Roman Obedience)
- Joannes Grimaldi (1394–1405)

=== 1400 to 1600 ===
- Philippus Ogerii, O. Carm. (1405–1411)
- Petrus Spinola, O.S.B. (1411–1413)
- Vincenzo de Viali (1413–1443)
- Valerianus Calderini (1442–1466)
- Giovanni Battista Cibò (1466–1472)
- Pietro Gara, O.P. (1472–1499)

Giuliano della Rovere (1499–1502) Administrator

- Galeotto della Rovere (1501–1504 Resigned)
- Giacomo della Rovere (1504–1510)

Raffaele Sansone Riario (1511–1516 Resigned) Administrator

- Tommaso Giovanni Riario (1516–1528 Died)

Agostino Spínola (1528–1537) Administrator
Giacomo Fieschi (1537–1545) Administrator, bishop-elect

- Niccolò Fieschi (1546–1562 Resigned)
- Giovanni Ambrosio Fieschi (1564–1576 Resigned)
- Cesare Ferrero (1576–1581)
- Domenico Grimaldi (1581–1584)
- Giovanni Battista Centurione (1584–1587 Resigned)
- Pietro Francesco Costa (1587–1624 Resigned)

=== 1600 to 1800 ===
- Francesco Maria Spinola, O.Theat. (1624–1664)
- Stefano Spínola, C.R.S. (1664–1682)
- Vincenzo Maria Durazzo, C.R. (1683–1722)
- Agostino Spínola, C.R.S. (1722–1755)
- Ottavio Maria de Mari (15 December 1755 – 27 March 1776)
- Dominico Maria Gentile (29 January 1776 – 20 September 1804)

=== since 1800 ===
- Vincenzo Maria Maggiolo (1804–1820)
- Giuseppe Vincenzo Airenti, O.S.D. (1820–1830)
- Agostino Maria Demari (1833–1840)
- Alessandro Ottaviano Ricardi di Netro (1842–1867)
- Giovanni Battista Cerruti (22 February 1867–21 Mar 1879)
- Giuseppe Boraggini (12 May 1879 – 30 April 1897)
- Giuseppe Salvatore Scatti (15 February 1898 –1926)
- Pasquale Righetti (1926–1948)
- Giovanni Battista Parodi (1948–1974)
- Franco Sibilla (1974 –1980)
- Giulio Sanguineti (1980–1989)
- Roberto Amadei (1990–1991)
- Dante Lafranconi (7 December 1991 – 8 September 2001) (transferred to Cremona)
- Domenico Calcagno (25 January 2002 – 2007), resigned
- Vittorio Lupi (30 November 2007 – 20 October 2016), retired
- Calogero Marino (20 October 2016 – )

== Parishes ==
Of the 71 parishes 68 lie within the Province of Savona, Liguria. The remaining three are in the neighbouring commune of Cogoleto, Province of Genoa, also in Liguria. In 2014 there was one Catholic priest for every 1,600 Catholics.

== See also ==
- Roman Catholic Diocese of Noli

== Books ==
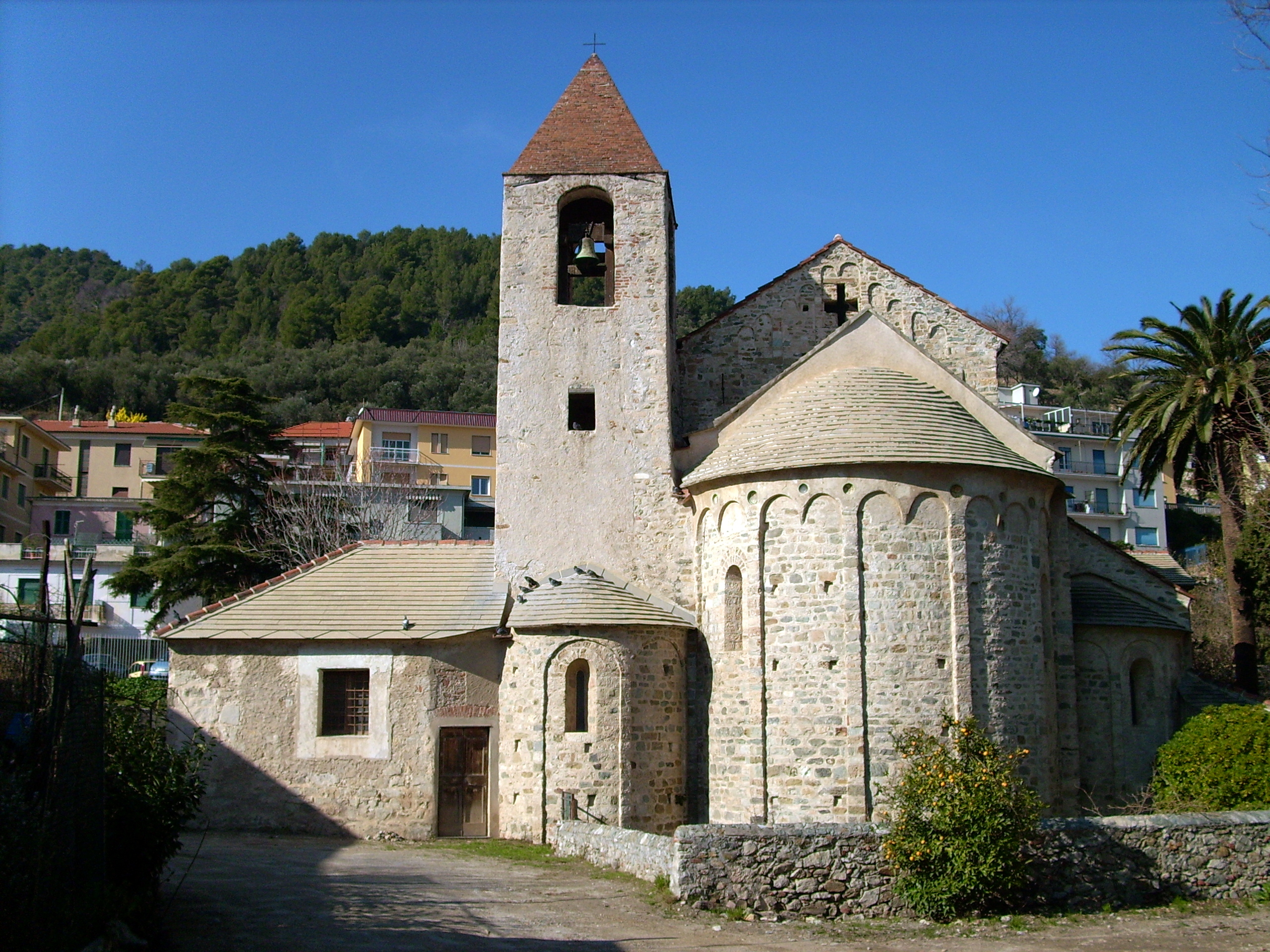
Cathedral in Noli.

=== Episcopal lists ===
- Gams, Pius Bonifatius (1873). Series episcoporum Ecclesiae catholicae (in Latin). Ratisbon: Typis et Sumptibus Georgii Josephi Manz. pp. 821-823. (Use with caution; obsolete)
- Eubel, Conradus, ed. (1913). Hierarchia catholica (in Latin). Vol. I (second ed.). Münster: Libreria Regensbergiana.
- Eubel, Conradus, ed. (1914). Hierarchia catholica (in Latin). Vol. II (second ed.). Münster: Libreria Regensbergiana.
- Eubel, Conradus; Gulik, Guilelmus (1923). Hierarchia catholica (in Latin). Vol. III (second ed.). Münster: Libreria Regensbergiana.
- Gauchat, Patritius (Patrice) (1935). Hierarchia catholica (in Latin). Vol. IV (1592-1667). Münster: Libraria Regensbergiana.
- Ritzler, Remigius; Sefrin, Pirminus (1952). Hierarchia catholica medii et recentis aevi (in Latin). Vol. V (1667-1730). Patavii: Messagero di S. Antonio.
- Ritzler, Remigius; Sefrin, Pirminus (1958). Hierarchia catholica medii et recentis aevi (in Latin). Vol. VI (1730-1799). Patavii: Messagero di S. Antonio.
- Ritzler, Remigius; Sefrin, Pirminus (1968). Hierarchia Catholica medii et recentioris aevi (in Latin). Vol. VII (1800–1846). Monasterii: Libreria Regensburgiana.
- Remigius Ritzler; Pirminus Sefrin (1978). Hierarchia catholica Medii et recentioris aevi (in Latin). Vol. VIII (1846–1903). Il Messaggero di S. Antonio.
- Pięta, Zenon (2002). Hierarchia catholica medii et recentioris aevi (in Latin). Vol. IX (1903–1922). Padua: Messagero di San Antonio. ISBN 978-88-250-1000-8.

=== Studies ===
- Bima, Palemone Luigi (1842). Serie cronologica dei romani pontefici e degli arcivescovi e vescovi di tutti gli stati di Terraferma & S. S. B. M. e di alcune del regno di Sardegna (in Italian) (seconda ed.). Torino: Favale. pp. 295–301.
- Bima, Palemone (1845). Serie cronologica degli arcivescovi e vescovi del regno di Sardegna (in Italian). Asti: Raspi. pp. 106–108.
- Cappelletti, Giuseppe (1857). Le chiese d'Italia della loro origine sino ai nostri giorni (in Italian). Vol. decimoterzo (13). Venezia: Giuseppe Antonelli. pp. 487–528.
- Kehr, Paul Fridolin, Italia Pontificia, Vol. VI: Liguria sive Provincia Mediolanensis (Berlin: Weidemann), pp. 353–357. (in Latin).
- Lanzoni, Francesco (1927). Le diocesi d'Italia dalle origini al principio del secolo VII (an. 604). Faenza 1927, pp. 844-845. (in Italian)
- Rinieri, Ilario (1906 ). Napoleone e Pio VII (1804-1813). (in Italian). Torino: Unione tipografico 1906. (pp. 228-288)
- Schwartz, Gerhard (1913). Die Besetzung der Bistümer Reichsitaliens unter den sächsischen und salischen Kaisern: mit den Listen der Bischöfe, 951-1122, Leipzig-Berlin 1913. (in German)
- Verzellino, Giovanni Vincenzo (1890), Delle memorie particolari e specialmente degli nomini illustri della città di Savona (in Italian) Savona: D. Bertolotto, 1890.
- Ughelli, Ferdinando; Coleti, Niccolò (1719). Italia sacra, sive De episcopis Italiæ, et insularum adjacentium (in Latin). Vol. Tomus quartus (4). Venezia: apud Sebastianum Coleti. pp. 730–744.
