= Società Storica Lombarda =

The Società Storica Lombarda (‘Lombardy Historical Society’) is a historical and humanistic association which was founded in 1873. It has 450 members from all over Italy.

== See also ==
- List of historical societies in Italy
