= Benedetto Solari =

Benedetto Solari (9 March 1742 – 13 April 1814) was an Italian bishop in Noli, Italy. During the Napoleonic era in Italy, he allied himself with the antipapal reforms approved by the Synod of Pistoia.

In 1765, he was inducted as a priest in the Dominican order, and in 1778, he was made bishop. His first treatise was a Dissertation (1789 Genoa) asserting that baptism did not suffice to invalidate the marriage between two nonbelievers. By 1794, he was denouncing publicly the papal bull of "Auctorem fidei" that countenanced much of the Synod of Pistoia. This led to a treatise by the reactionary Cardinal Gerdil against the proposals of Solari.
