= Antonio de' Saluzzi =

Most Reverend Antonio de' Saluzzi
- Archbishop of Milan
- Church: Catholic Church
- Archdiocese: Roman Catholic Archdiocese of Milan
- In office: 1376–1401
- Predecessor: Simone Brossano
- Successor: Pietro Filargis

Personal details
- Born: c.1330
- Died: 1401 Milan, Duchy of Milan

Antonio de' Saluzzi (died 1401) was a Roman Catholic prelate who served as Archbishop of Milan (1376–1401) and Bishop of Savona (1355–1376).

== Biography ==
Antonio de' Saluzzi was from an aristocratic family originally from Saluzzo, perhaps related to the powerful marquises of the region.

On 7 Nov 1355, Antonio de' Saluzzi was appointed during the papacy of Pope Innocent VI as Bishop of Savona.

On 7 Jun 1376, he was appointed during the papacy of Pope Gregory XI as Archbishop of Milan.

Antonio de' Saluzzi was the initiator of the construction of the Milan Cathedral in 1386. The work was started with the collaboration of Duke Gian Galeazzo Visconti and the factory was started to meet not only the needs and aspirations of the Milanese to have a new, more capacious cathedral for the celebration of their liturgical functions, but also because since 1392 the ancient metropolitan church of Santa Tecla had been deemed unusable because it was unsafe.

He served as Archbishop of Milan until his death in 1401.

Catholic Church titles
Preceded by	Bishop of Savona; 1355–1376	Succeeded by
Preceded by Simone Brossano	Archbishop of Milan; 1376–1401	Succeeded by Pietro Filargis
