= Antonio Ferrero =

Italian Roman Catholic bishop and cardinal

Antonio Ferrero (died 1508) (called the Cardinal of Gubbio) was an Italian Roman Catholic bishop and cardinal.

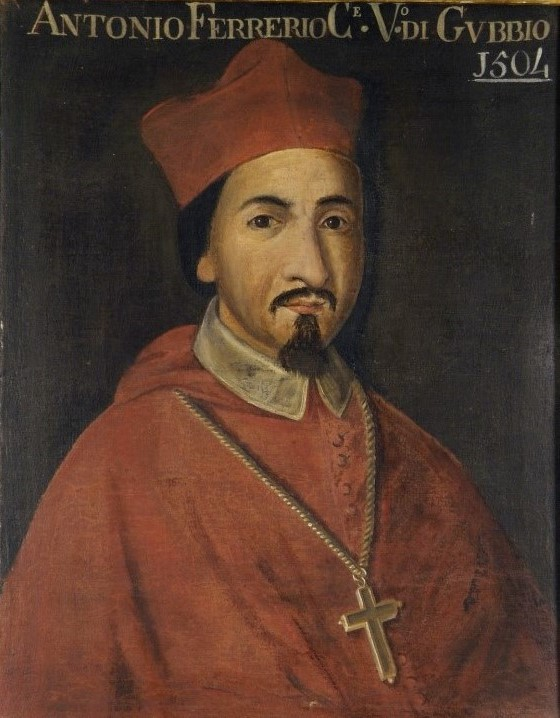

== Biography ==
Antonio Ferrero was born into a poor family in Savona. As a youth, he was a squire of Cardinal Girolamo Basso della Rovere. He then entered the service of Cardinal Giuliano della Rovere, the future Pope Julius II, who made him a protonotary apostolic and majordomo of the papal household.

On 8 January 1504 he was elected Bishop of Noli. He was consecrated as a bishop in the Vatican by Pope Julius II on 9 April 1504. He was transferred to the see of Gubbio on 13 August 1504, occupying that see for the rest of his life. He became Master of the Pontifical Household and Prefect of the Apostolic Palace.

Pope Julius II made him a cardinal priest in the consistory of 1 December 1505. He received the red hat and the titular church of San Vitale on 17 December 1505.

On 23 January 1506 he was appointed papal legate in Perugia. He was named Bishop of Perugia on 30 March 1506. He also served as a pro-datary.

On 20 February 1507 he was appointed papal legate in Bologna. In Bologna, he had several inhabitants executed and extorted 30,000 gold ducats from the populace. He also may have conspired to assassinate the pope. As such, the pope recalled the cardinal to Rome in August 1507 and ordered the cardinal be imprisoned in the Castel Sant'Angelo. He was subsequently fined 20,000 scudi and then imprisoned in the convent of Sant'Onofrio.

He died in custody in Rome on 23 July 1508. He was buried without ceremony in the Basilica di Sant'Agostino and his estates were sold in order to repay his victims.
