= Società Savonese di Storia Patria =

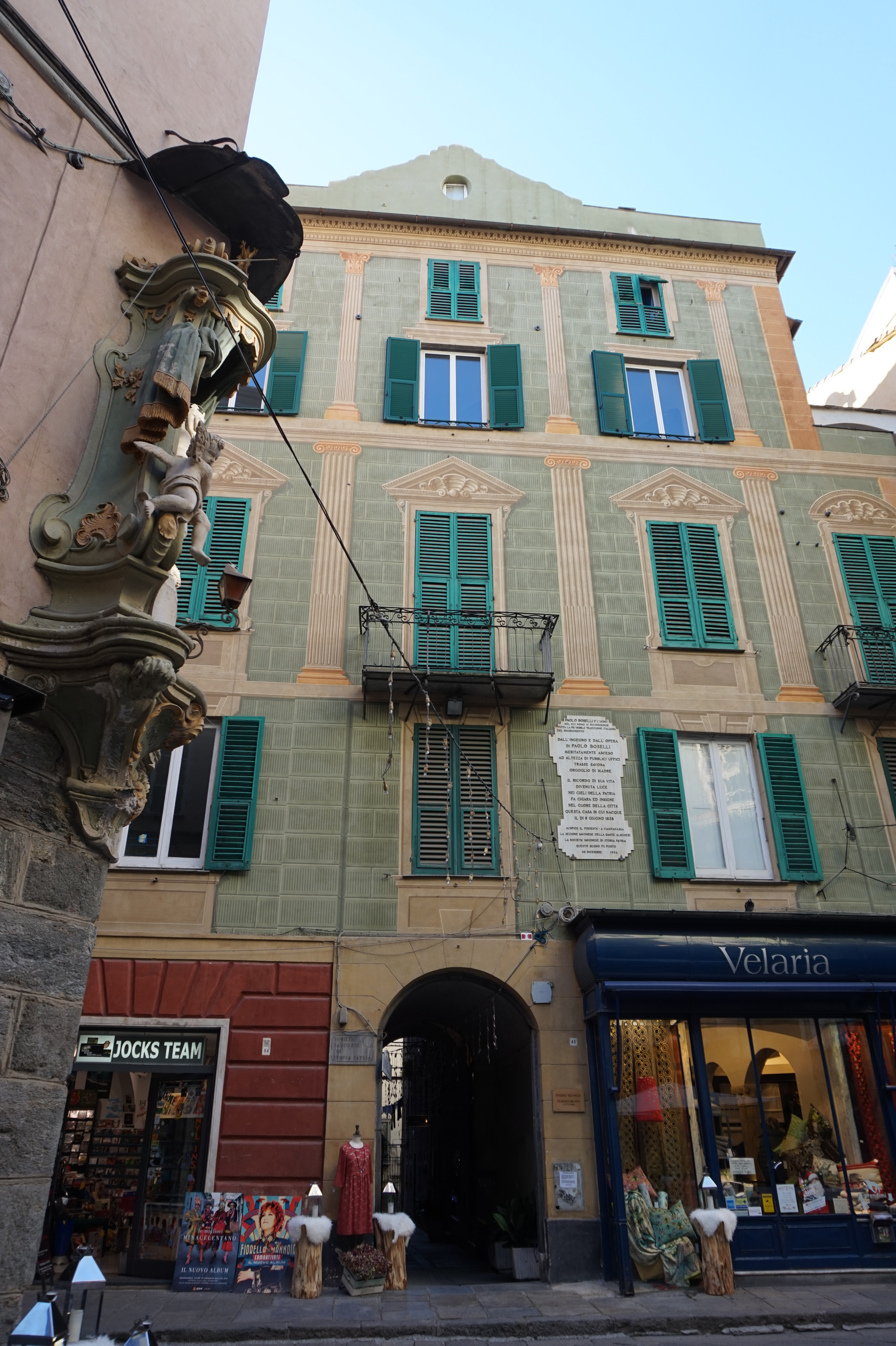
Savona, Boselli's home: the location of the Society

The Società Savonese di Storia Patria (SSSP) is a non-profit historical society founded in 1885. Its registered location is in Savona: its statutory interests are directed towards historical Liguria, and so they cover an area wider than the current homonym Italian region.

== History ==
The Società Savonese di Storia Patria was founded on 27 December 1885 with the name of Società storica savonese by a group of intellectuals at the request of Paolo Boselli, the future Prime Minister. In 1916 it assumed its present name.

== Social activities and library ==
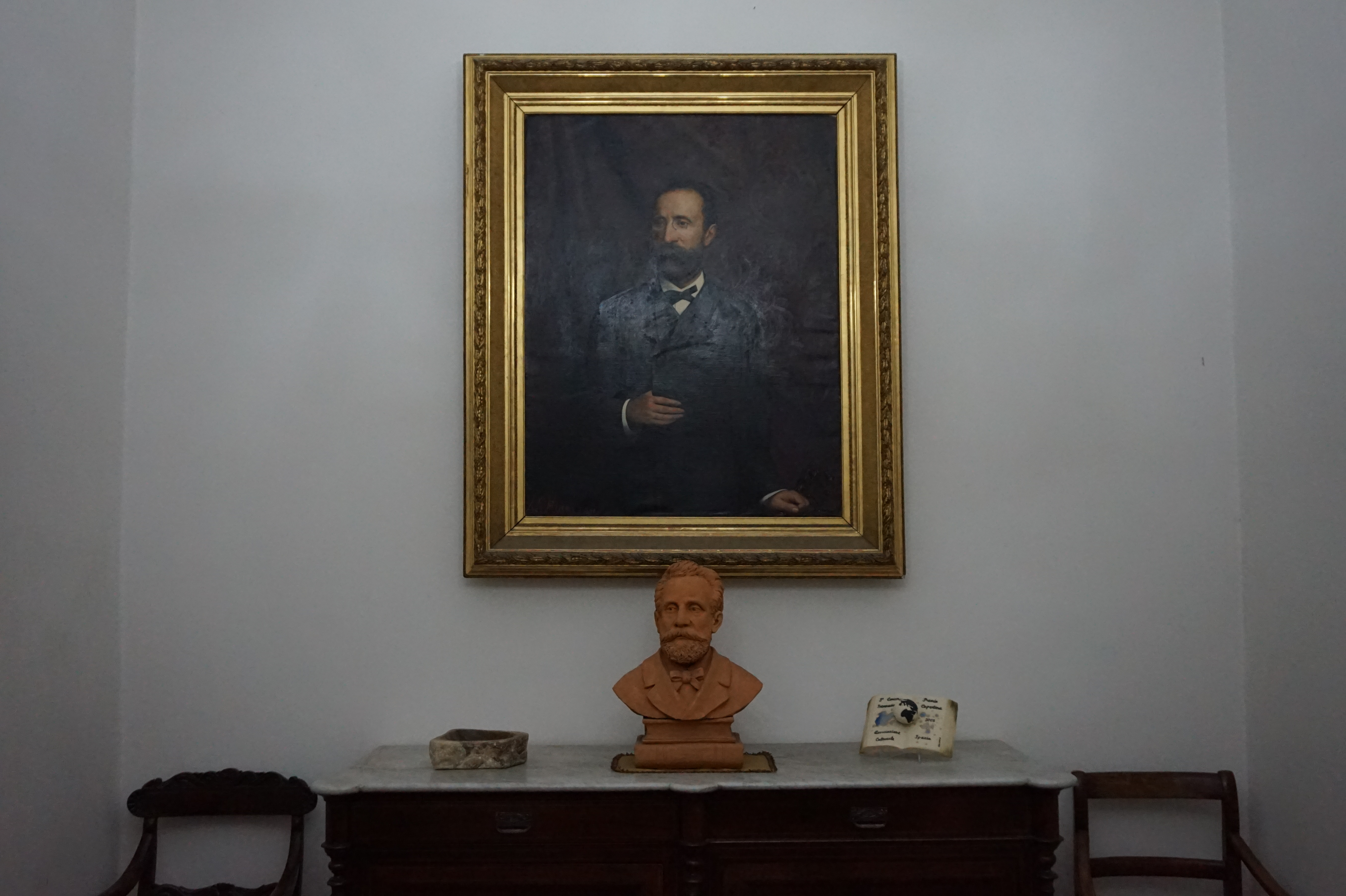
Society's entrance hall with the portrait and the bust of Boselli

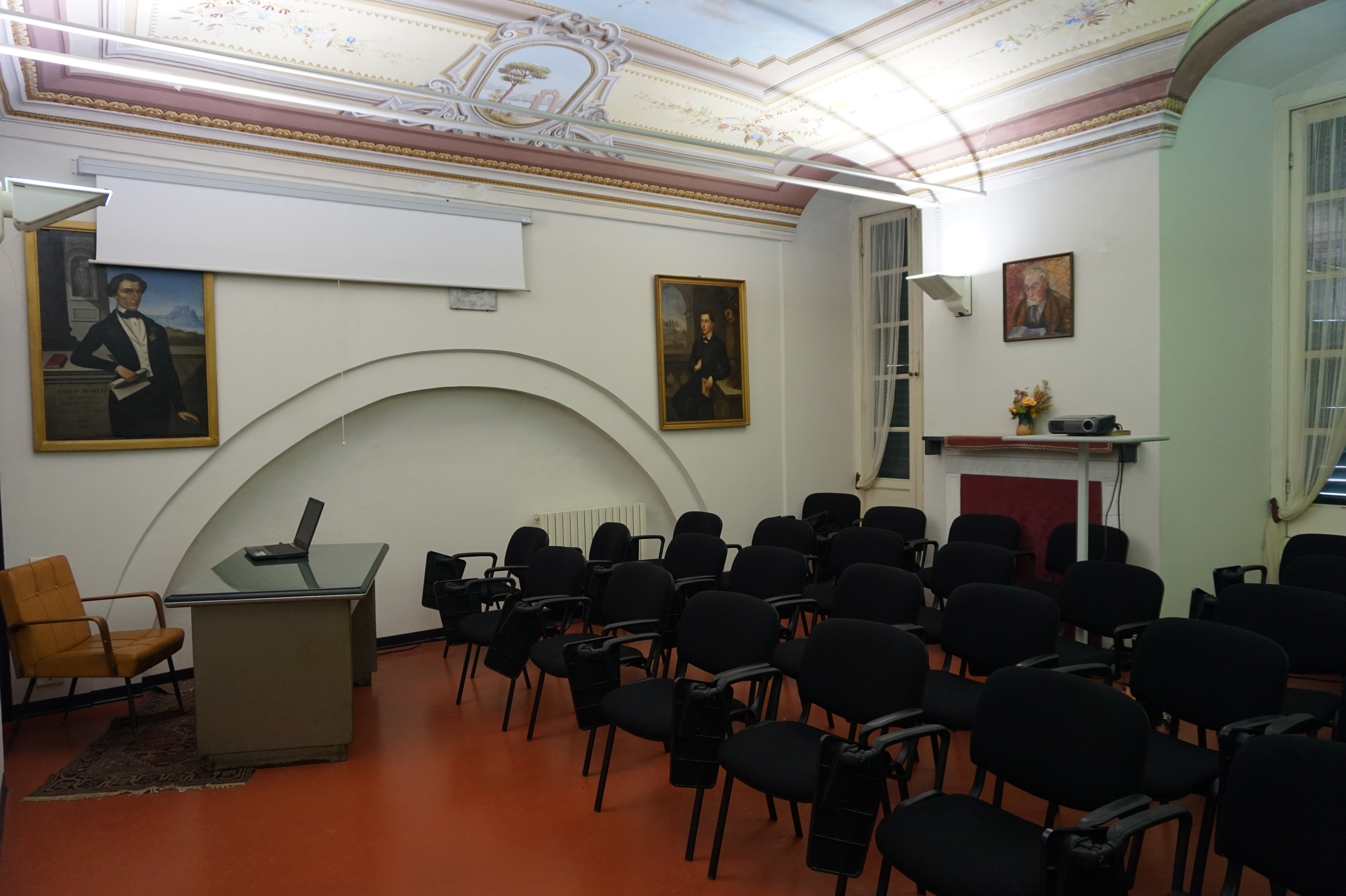
Conference room

The social activity is coordinated by a board of council members and it is mainly expressed in the publication of an annual volume of Atti e memorie and other publishing activities (magazine Sabazia, editorial series Zetesis and Novecento). The non-publishing activities are very intense and they include historical conferences, also organized with other institutions, and interventions more closely linked to the cultural life. The Society owns a specialized library of more than 50,000 titles.

== Historical Toponymy Project ==
The main ongoing research of the society is represented by the Progetto Toponomastica Storica (Historical Toponymy Project) that collects and studies historical place names; the project began in 2011 and up to now has published over 50,000 pre–19th century toponyms, related to Liguria and Piedmont.

== Presidents ==
- 1885–1932 Paolo Boselli
- 1932–1941 Filippo Noberasco
- 1948–1964 Italo Scovazzi
- 1964–2007 Carlo Russo (honorary president)
- 1964–1972 Lorenzo Vivaldo
- 1972–1978 Adele Restagno
- 1978–1984 Giulio Fiaschini
- 1984–1990 Carlo Varaldo
- 1990–2000 Almerino Lunardon
- 2000–2002 Furio Ciciliot
- 2002–2005 Marco Castiglia
- 2005–2011 Carmelo Prestipino
- 2011–2013 Francesco Murialdo
- 2013–2018 Carmelo Prestipino
- 2018–present Furio Ciciliot

== See also ==
- Paolo Boselli
- List of historical societies in Italy
