= Noli =

Noli Nöi (Ligurian)
- Comune
- Comune di Noli

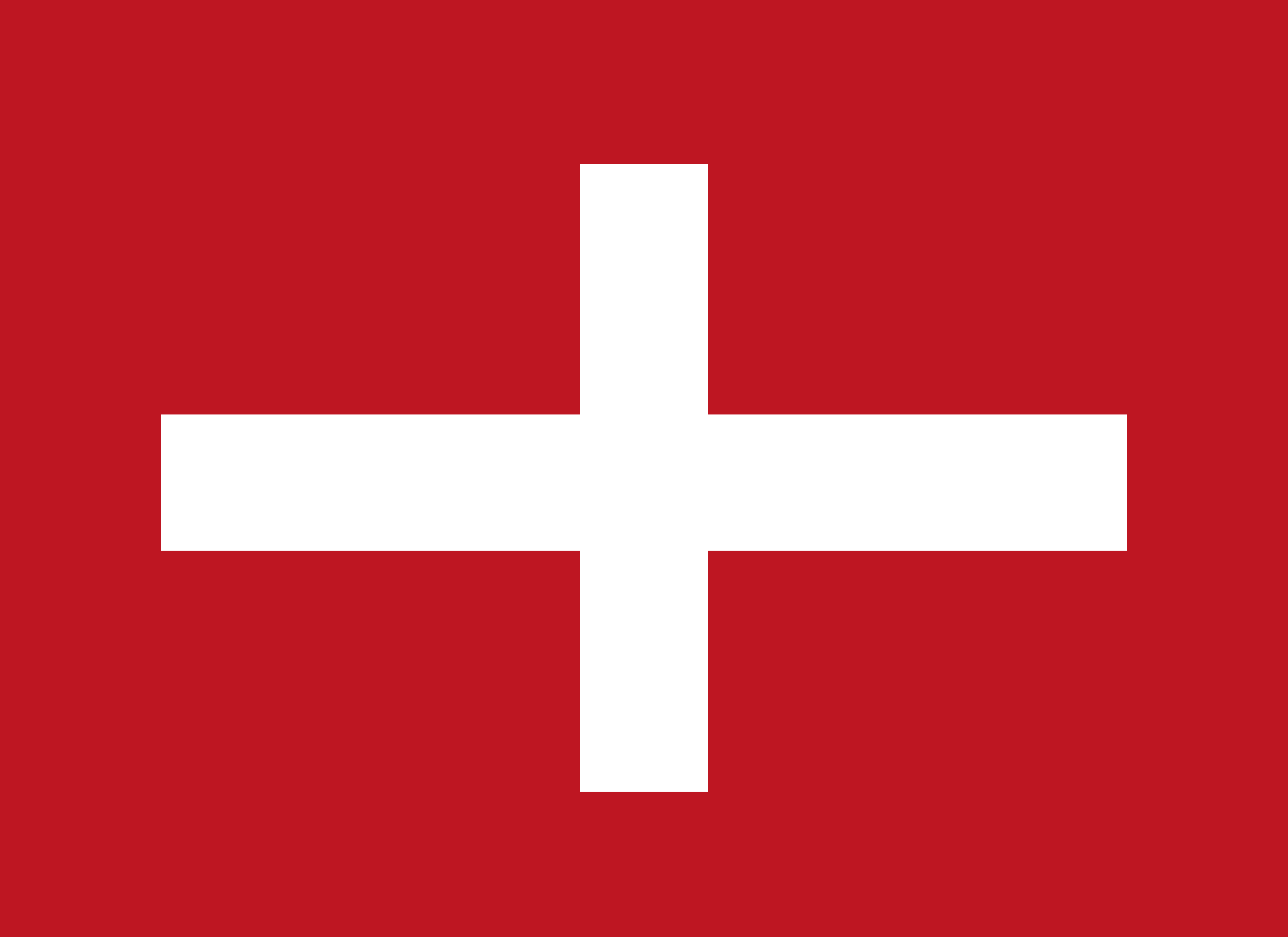
- Flag Coat of arms

- Location within Italy Location within Liguria
- Coordinates: 44°12′22″N 8°24′48″E
- Country: Italy
- Region: Liguria
- Province: Savona (SV)
- Frazioni: Tosse, Voze

Area
  - Total: 9.623 km^{2} (3.715 sq mi)
- Elevation: 2 m (6.6 ft)

Population (31 December 2010)
  - Total: 2,861
  - Density: 297.3/km^{2} (770.0/sq mi)
- Demonym: Nolesi
- Time zone: UTC+1 (CET)
  - Summer (DST): UTC+2 (CEST)
- Postal code: 17026
- Dialing code: 019
- Patron saint: Eugenius of Carthage
- Saint day: Second Sunday of July
- Website: Official website

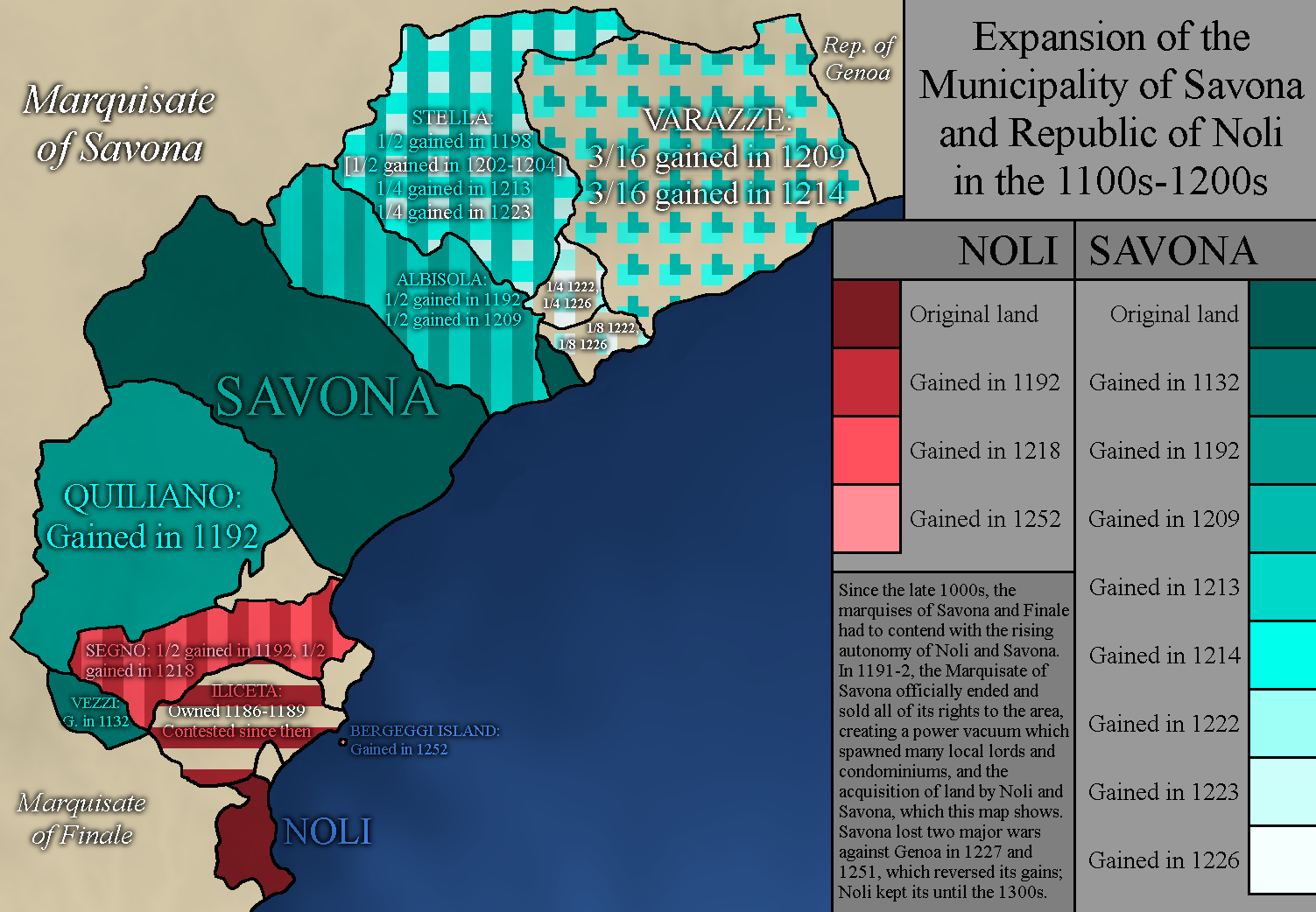
A map showing the expansion of the Municipality of Savona and Republic of Noli during the 1100s and 1200s. Sources are listed in the image's description.

Noli (Italian: [ˈnɔːli]; Ligurian: Nöi [ˈnɔːi]) is a coast comune of Liguria, Italy, in the Province of Savona, it is about 50 kilometres (31 mi) southwest of Genoa by rail, about 4 metres (13 ft) above sea-level. The origin of the name may come from Neapolis, meaning "new city" in Greek.

It is one of I Borghi più belli d'Italia ("The most beautiful villages of Italy"). From 1192 to 1797 Noli was one of the maritime republics, the Republic of Noli.

== Geography ==
The bounding communes of Noli are Finale Ligure, Spotorno and Vezzi Portio.

== History ==
The name Noli, testified in the form Naboli in the oldest documents (between 1004 and 1005), certainly derives from a form of Neapolis which means "new city" in Byzantine Greek (same etymology as for Naples).

It may be mentioned as Neapolis by 7th century geographer George of Cyprus.

The Republic of Noli was an independent republic from 1193 until 1797. In 1239 a diocese of Noli was established, which was to endure till its amalgamation with that of Savona as the Diocese of Savona-Noli in 1986. The Napoleonic invasion in 1797 put an end to Noli's sovereignty.

== Main sights ==
- Romanesque basilica of S. Paragorio (11th century)
- Household and annexed Tower (14th-15th century)
- San Paragorio (5th–6th century)
- Tower and Gate Papone (13th-14th centuries)
- Tower of Four Sides.
- Nemo's Garden (Noli)
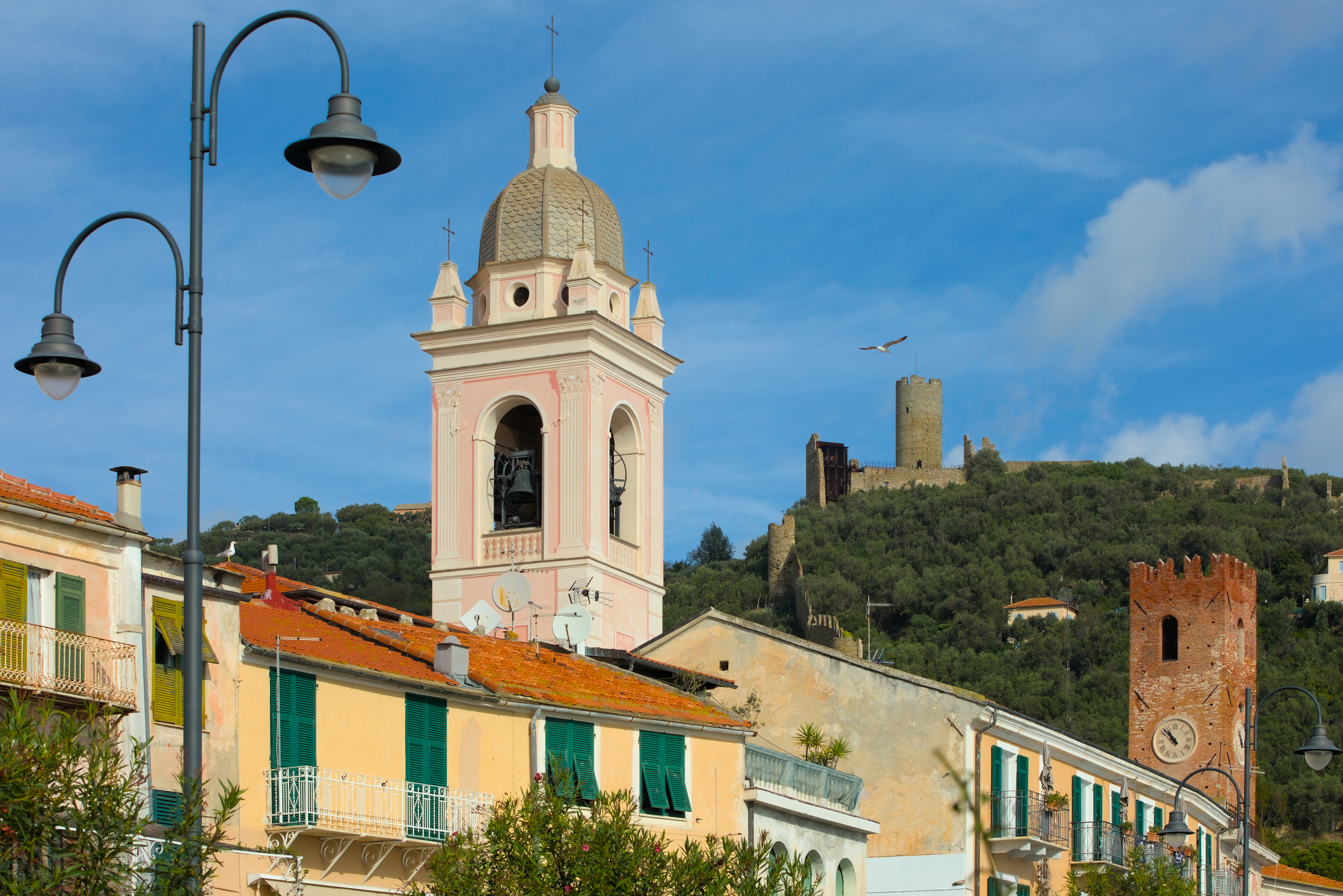
Cathedral tower, castle and Torre del Comune.

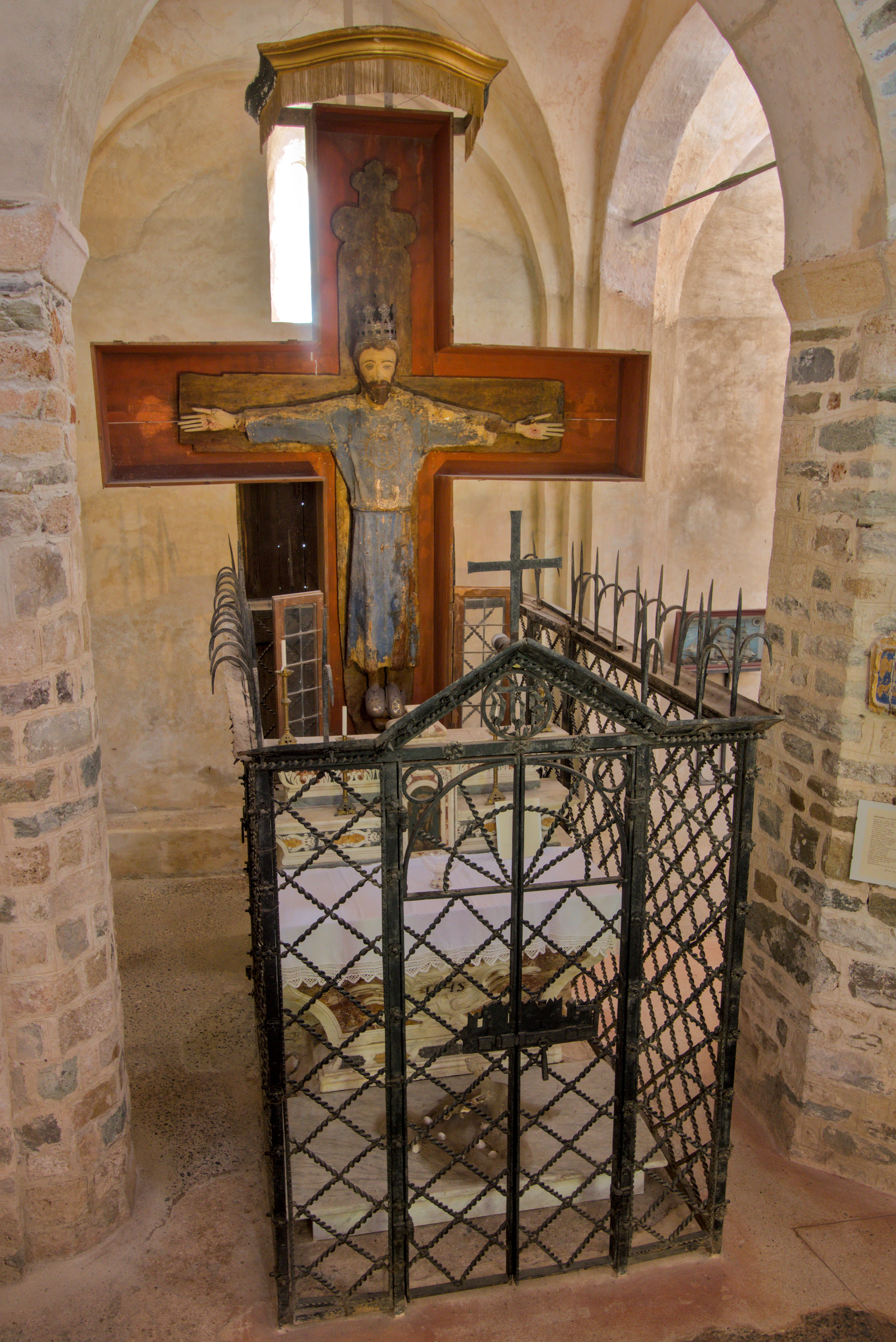
Romanesque wooden Christ inside San Paragorio.

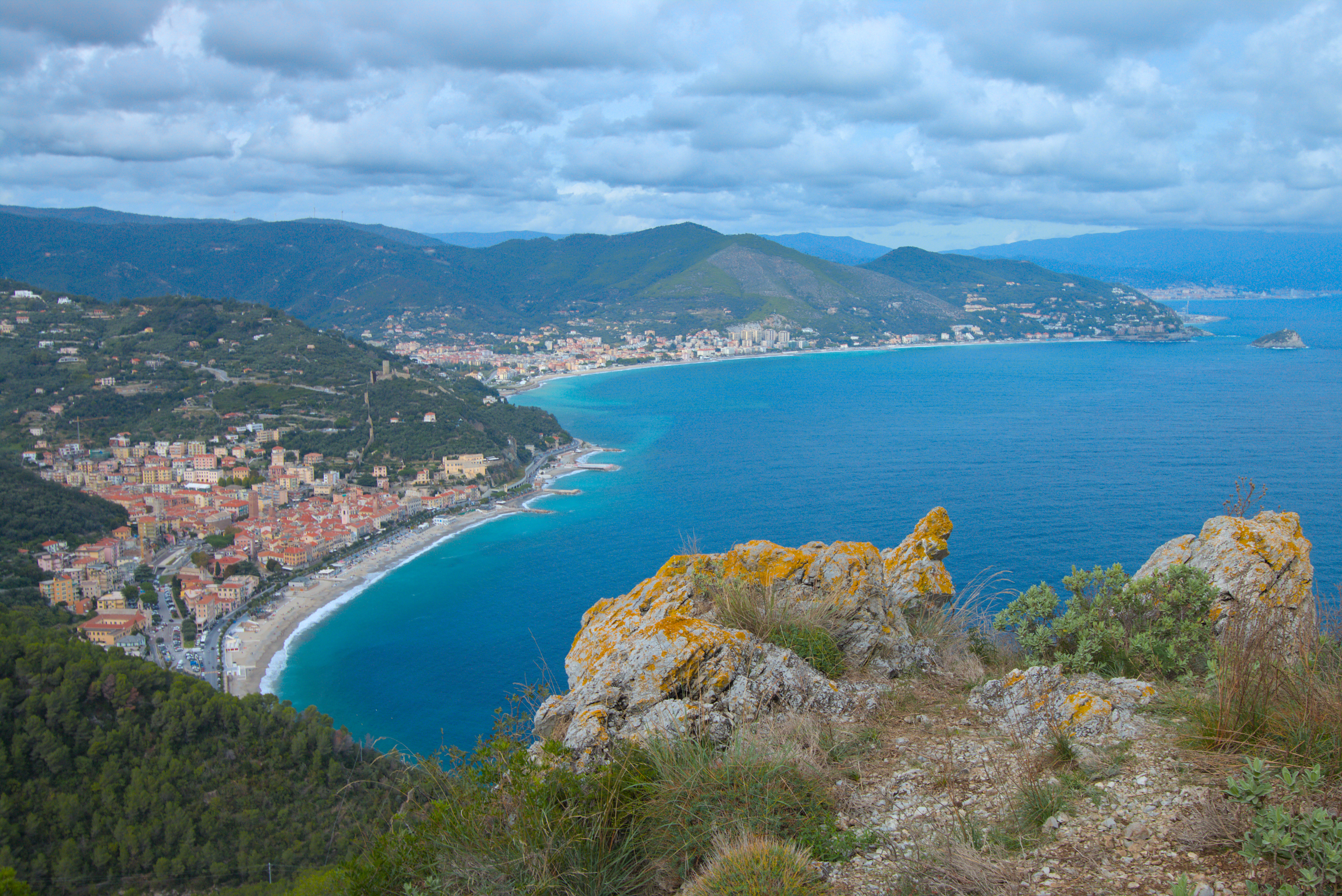
Noli and Spotorno viewed from Capo Noli.

== Twin towns — sister cities ==
Noli is twinned with:

- Langenargen, Germany (2005)

== Personalities ==
- António de Noli, Italian nobleman and explorer, discoverer of some Guinea territories and Cape Verde islands on behalf of the Portuguese crown. Born in Genoa 1419, "family with origins in Noli or the Castle of Noli".
