= Spotorno =

Spotorno Ligurian: Spoturnu
- Comune
- Comune di Spotorno
- Aerial view of Spotorno

- Coat of arms

- Location within Italy Location within Liguria
- Coordinates: 44°13′36″N 8°25′00″E
- Country: Italy
- Region: Liguria
- Province: Savona (SV)

Government
  - Mayor: Mattia Fiorini (Civic list)

Area
  - Total: 8.02 km^{2} (3.10 sq mi)
- Elevation: 7 m (23 ft)

Population (1-1-2017)
  - Total: 3,786
  - Density: 472/km^{2} (1,220/sq mi)
- Demonym: Spotornese(i)
- Time zone: UTC+1 (CET)
  - Summer (DST): UTC+2 (CEST)
- Postal code: 17028
- Dialing code: 019
- Website: Official website

Spotorno (Ligurian: Spoturnu) is a comune (municipality) in the Province of Savona in the Italian region Liguria, located about 45 kilometres (28 mi) southwest of Genoa and about 9 kilometres (6 mi) southwest of Savona. Today the town is an important holiday center of Riviera delle Palme, but in the past fishing and trade were the main economic activities together with the shipyards along the coast which were pretty famous for the building of brigantines.

Spotorno borders the following municipalities: Bergeggi, Noli, Vado Ligure, and Vezzi Portio.

== Twin towns ==
- Bad Dürrheim, Germany
- Høje-Taastrup, Denmark
