= Giovanni Vincenzo Verzellino =

17th-century Italian chronicler

- Born: 1562; Savona, Republic of Genoa
- Died: August 20, 1638 (aged 75–76); Savona, Republic of Genoa

Academic background
- Education: University of Genoa

Academic work
- Notable works: Delle memorie particolari e specialmente degli uomini illustri della città di Savona

Giovanni Vincenzo Verzellino (1562–1638) was an Italian historian, civic official, and chronicler, recognised as a leading figure in the historiography of Savona. His principal work, Delle memorie particolari e specialmente degli uomini illustri della città di Savona, remained unpublished until the late 19th century, but it later became a foundational text for the study of Savona's local history.

== Early life and background ==
Verzellino was born in 1562 into a noble and affluent family in Savona. His father, Giovan Francesco Verzellino, belonged to a family ennobled between the 15th and 16th centuries, with residences in prominent areas of the city such as Via Cassari, Scarzeria, and Pia. Verzellino received a classical humanist education, excelling in philosophy, ancient languages, literature, and mathematics. He later pursued legal studies, likely at the University of Genoa, and obtained a law degree. He married Geronima Onofrii, though some sources identify his wife as Geronima Grossi, both from Savonese noble families. They had four children—two sons and two daughters, the latter of whom became nuns.

== Career ==
As a wealthy citizen, Verzellino held various civic positions in 17th-century Savona. He became a member of the Order of Merchants in 1608, was elected Representative of the Commune in 1613, and served as a Municipal Councillor in 1628. In this capacity, he participated in significant civic events, such as the solemn recognition of Blessed Ottaviano of Savona. His public duties gave him access to administrative records and municipal archives, which proved crucial for his historical research. His involvement in civic life was closely intertwined with his scholarly work.

Verzellino's primary historical contribution is Delle memorie particolari e specialmente degli uomini illustri della città di Savona, a work composed over 25 years. It documented the history of Savona and biographical accounts of its notable citizens including ancestors of Christopher Columbus, drawing on over 300 authors and a wide range of sources including civic statutes, church records, genealogies, and earlier chronicles. His research methodology was unusually exhaustive for the period. The original manuscript, prepared for publication, was stolen shortly before his death, an event some contemporaries believed contributed to his demise. Though unpublished in his lifetime, copies circulated among local scholars and noble families. The complete work was eventually published in two volumes (1885–1891) by Andrea Astengo, a Savonese priest and historian.

Verzellino also compiled Armi di Famiglie Savonesi (1621), cataloguing the coats of arms of 244 local families. Though the original manuscript is lost, a microfilm survives in the Savona State Archives. He also authored Delle memorie di Savona and Avviso ai Lettori intorno a’ Cognomi Rovere, addressing historical and genealogical complexities, particularly in relation to the Della Rovere family. His manuscripts include accounts of contemporary events, such as the 1584 visit by Isabella Andreini or 1601 visit of the Safavid ambassador Huseyn Ali Bey Bayat to Savona.

Verzellino participated in the art historical discussions of his time. Along with Raffaele Soprani, he attempted to distinguish the Savonese sculptor Leonardo Sormani from the "Lionardo Milanese" mentioned by Giorgio Vasari, though modern scholarship suggests these were likely the same individual.

Giovanni Vincenzo Verzellino died on 20 August 1638 in Savona, shortly after the death of his friend Gabriello Chiabrera.

== Friendship with Chiabrera ==
Verzellino lived during a period of diminished autonomy for Savona, following its conquest by Genoa in 1528 and the destruction of its port. Despite Genoese rule, Savona maintained cultural vitality. Verzellino's work, alongside that of his close friend, the poet Gabriello Chiabrera, reflects a local intellectual milieu that persisted under political subjugation. Chiabrera dedicated several works to Verzellino, including his XXVI Sermon and a discourse on a Petrarchan sonnet in which Verzellino is featured as an interlocutor, a common literary device to honor a respected friend or patron. Furthermore, Verzellino is known to have possessed copies of some of Chiabrera's unpublished works, including his Elogi (Eulogies).

== Legacy ==
Giovanni Vincenzo Verzellino's primary impact as a historian of Savona was largely posthumous. Verzellino's reputation was revived in the 19th and 20th centuries. Verzellino's work has been interpreted as an act of cultural preservation, asserting Savona's historical identity in the face of Genoese suppression. His historical project served as a counter-narrative to Genoese historiography. The publication of his Memorie by Andrea Astengo marked a turning point, and further scholarly interest was developed by the Società Savonese di Storia Patria. Carlo Migliardi published a comprehensive biography in 1934, and Filippo Noberasco followed with a detailed study of Verzellino's historical method and sources in 1938. He is commemorated in Savona by a street named in his honour, Via Giovanni Vincenzo Verzellino. His work remains a critical source for the study of the city's history.

== Works ==
Title	Date	Description	Status
Delle memorie particolari e specialmente degli uomini illustri della città di Savona	c.1600s–1630s	Comprehensive history of Savona with biographies of notable citizens	Published posthumously (1885–1891)
Armi di Famiglie Savonesi	1621	Heraldic collection of 244 Savonese families	Manuscript lost; microfilm copy extant
Delle memorie di Savona	Post-1623	Supplementary historical manuscript	Located in Biblioteca Civica di Savona
Avviso ai Lettori intorno a’ Cognomi Rovere	Unknown	Discussion of genealogical issues in the Della Rovere family	Published in Astengo's edition of Memorie
Miscellanea sulla storia di Savona	Unknown	Preparatory notes and research excerpts	Unpublished
