= San Paragorio =

Coordinates: 44°12′12.54″N 8°24′54.28″E

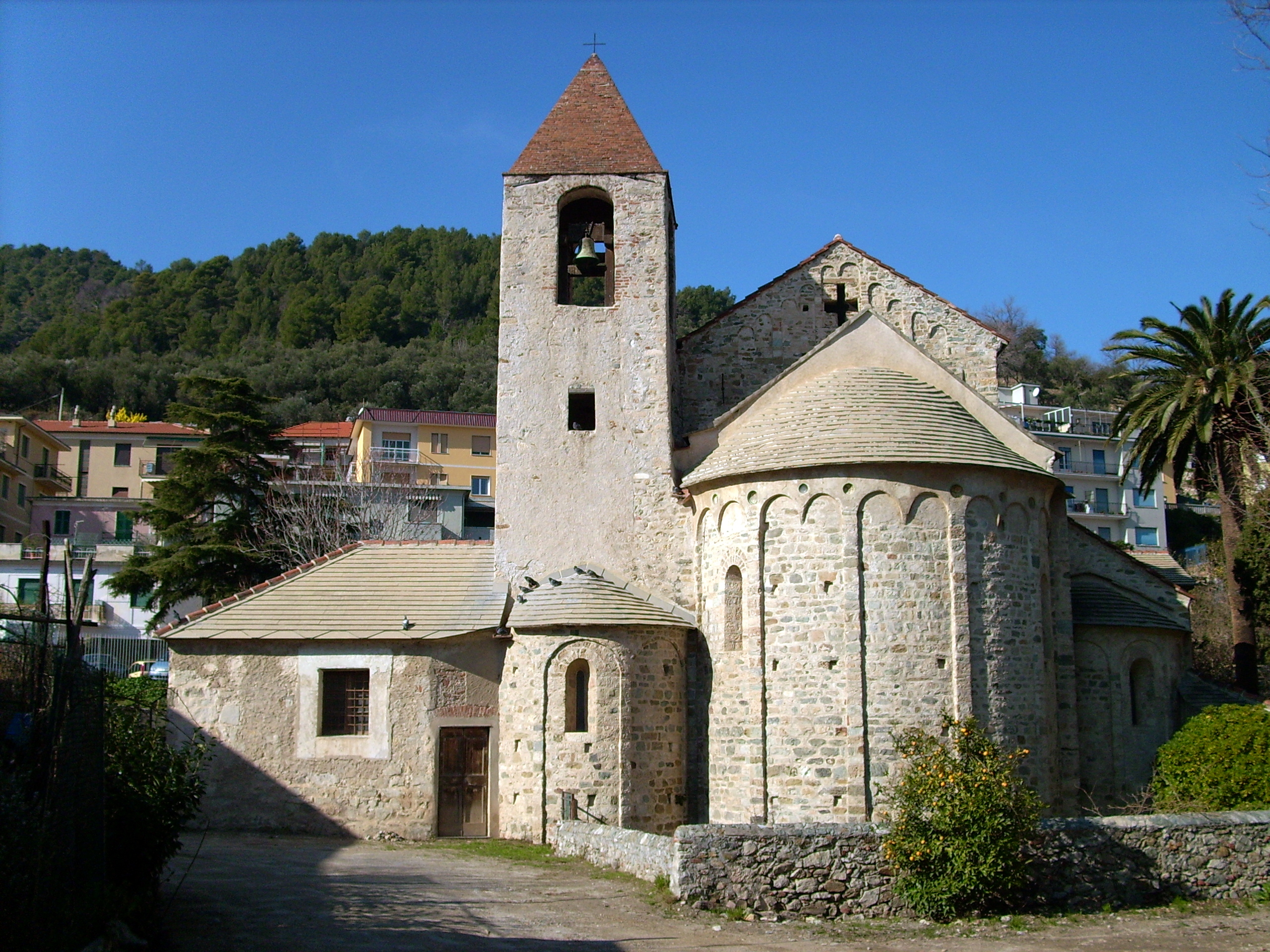
- The central apse and the bell tower

- Location within Italy
- Location: Noli, Savona
- Country: Italy

San Paragorio is a church located outside the Medieval walls of the town of Noli, province of Savona. It is an important monument of Romanesque architecture in Liguria. It is an Italian national monument since 1890.

== Architecture and history of the church ==
The church has two phases of use: Paleochristian (5th–6th century) and Romanesque (11th century). It is dedicated to St. Paragorius, a saint who fled with his companions from Libia, to escape from persecution under Diocletian (end of the 3rd century), took refuge in Corsica, in the town of Calenzana, and there was martyred. In the 5th–6th century his relics were taken to Noli, as the island was threatened with invasions of Vandals. Presence of the remains of the saint resulted in development of the religious complex. It was restored by an architect Alfredo D'Andrade after the earthquake of 1887.

The entrance is found on the left side of the church. The white and black coloring of the portal (from 13th century) matches the gothic protruding porch, made of stone and bricks, supported by two columns. To the left of the entrance are located two monumental arcosolium tombs (13th–14th century). Some traces of frescos attributed to celebrated Lombard artists can still be seen. The tomb of Gandolfo De Gasco (1272), identifiable by its Gothic inscription, is situated on the right of the protruding porch. Between the church and the surrounding wall, can be seen four Paleochristian sarcophagi dating to 5th–7th century, discovered during the archaeological excavations. It is worth noting that the central apse is decorated with eleven Islamic bowls, above the row of small blind arches. These decorative elements (recently taken for restoration; the present ones are copies) are among the most ancient walled bowls in Liguria (from about 1050 AD). Remains of a Paleochristan baptistery and late antique necropolis were found in the archaeological excavations carried out in the 1970's by Nino Lamboglia in the area around the church. Later excavations under the Ligurian Archaeological Superintendence showed also remains of a settlement of craftsmen and of the early church edifices (6th century).

The church is subdivided into three naves with semi-circular apses. The central nave is separated by massive pillars, decorated with different forms, supporting large semi-circular arches. The roof above the central nave rests on decorative wooden trusses (an original piece is exposed on the back wall of the left nave). The presbytery can be reached along a ramp. It is decorated with fifteen tall niches resting on a bench running all along the central apse. In these niches are visible three 15th-century fresco paintings: in the rectangular central niche there is a crucifix, and in the two lateral niches there are the images of St. Peter and St. Paul. On the left wall of the presbytery we can see a marble Renaissance tabernacle carrying the donor's name, the bishop of Noli, Vincenzo Boverio (bishop of years 1506–1519, from family of pope Julian II). To the right of the altar there is a copy of the bishop's cathedra (throne, from 1239). On its wooden back engraved is the crest of the Genoese bishop of Noli, Paolo Giustiniani (bishop of years 1459–1485). The crypt can be reached by descending the stairs to either side of the presbytery. The place became a crypt only in the 11th century, during the erection of the Romanesque church. Previously, in this place stood two little chapels, built in the 4th–5th century directly on the sandy ground (three meters down from present ground level). Inside, it is possible to see Roman monolithic columns, reused as support by Medieval builders. Coming back to the ground floor, in the right nave, can be seen an octagonal baptismal font for full immersion (rebuilt in 1889). Also on the right, closer to the presbytery, is exposed a beautifully painted wooden crucifix, called "Volto Santo" (Holy Visage), with a 12th Century sculpture of oriental origin of martyred Jesus in characteristic long surplice (colobium). Nearby stands the pulpit, also rebuilt in 1889 from several remaining marble panels. Under the pulpit is exposed a round tomb stone, made from slate and marble (decoration style unique to Liguria), that remembers Domino Verdane (nobleman from Noli, 1296). On the walls of the side naves are visible 15th–16th-century paintings, among them one by Teramo Piaggio, representing St. Paragorius on a horse with his three brothers in faith, Parteo, Partenopeo and Severino, with the Virgin and the Child.

== Gallery ==
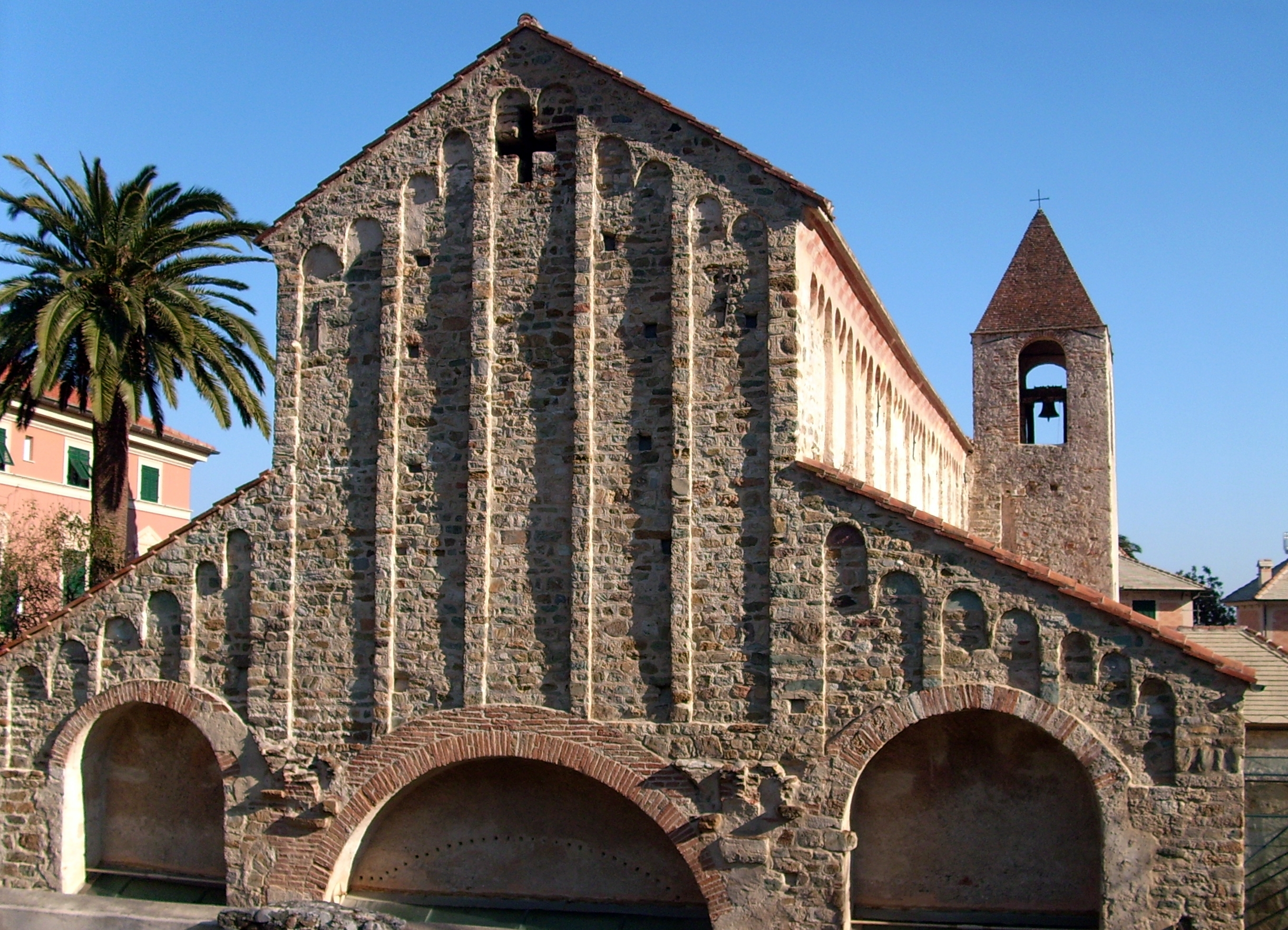
Facade

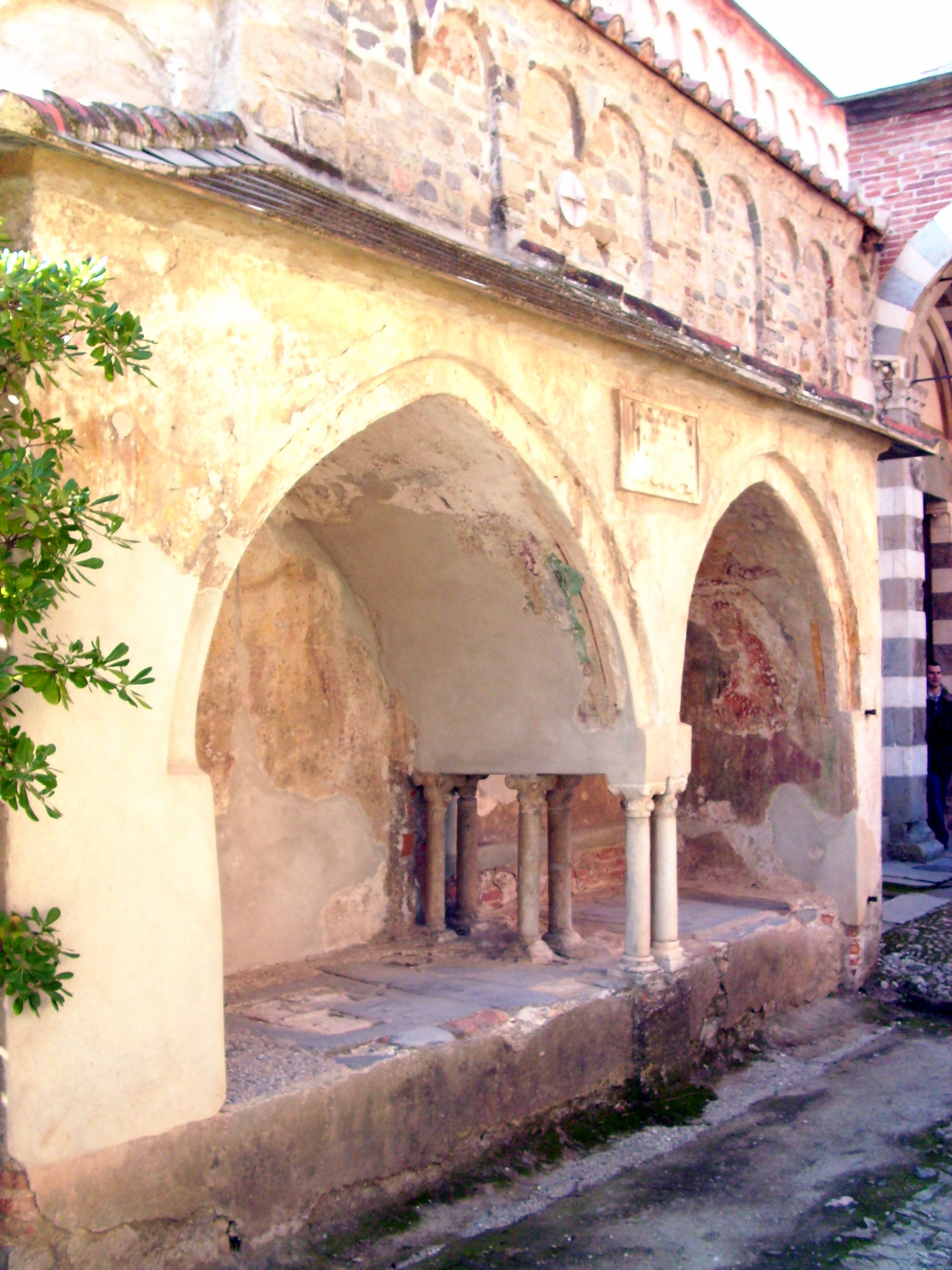
Grave in double arcosolium

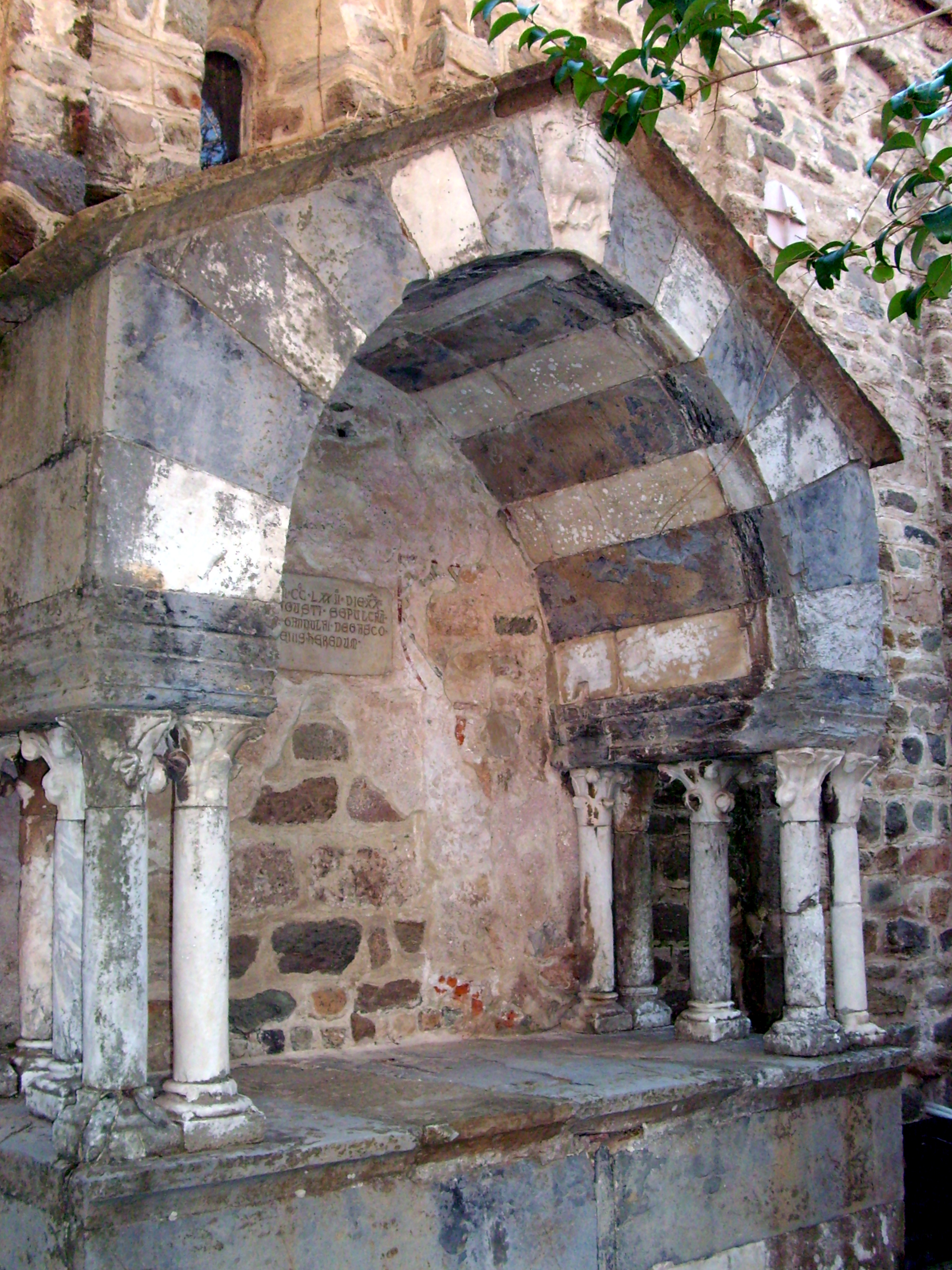
Grave in single arcosolium

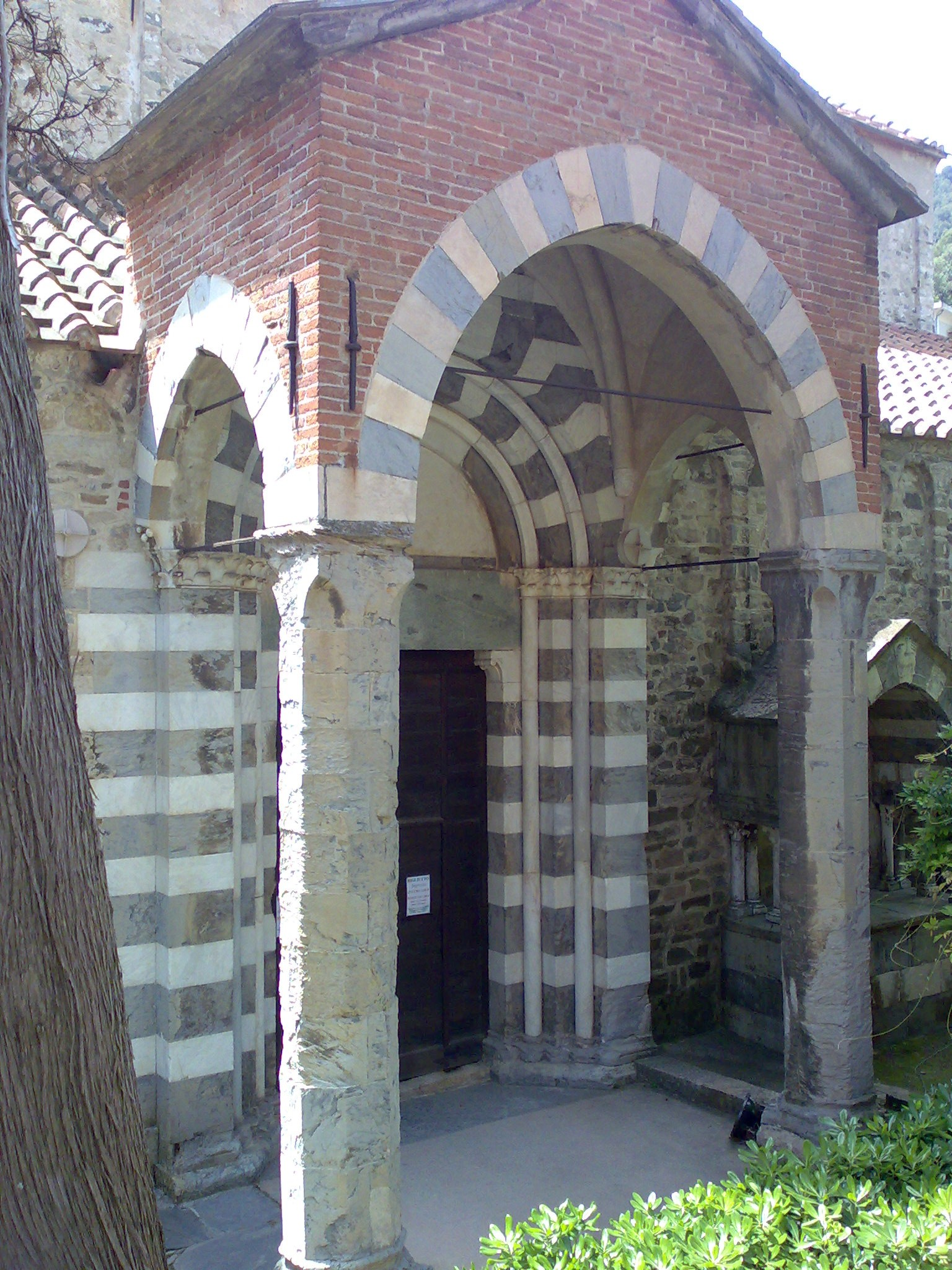
Entrance

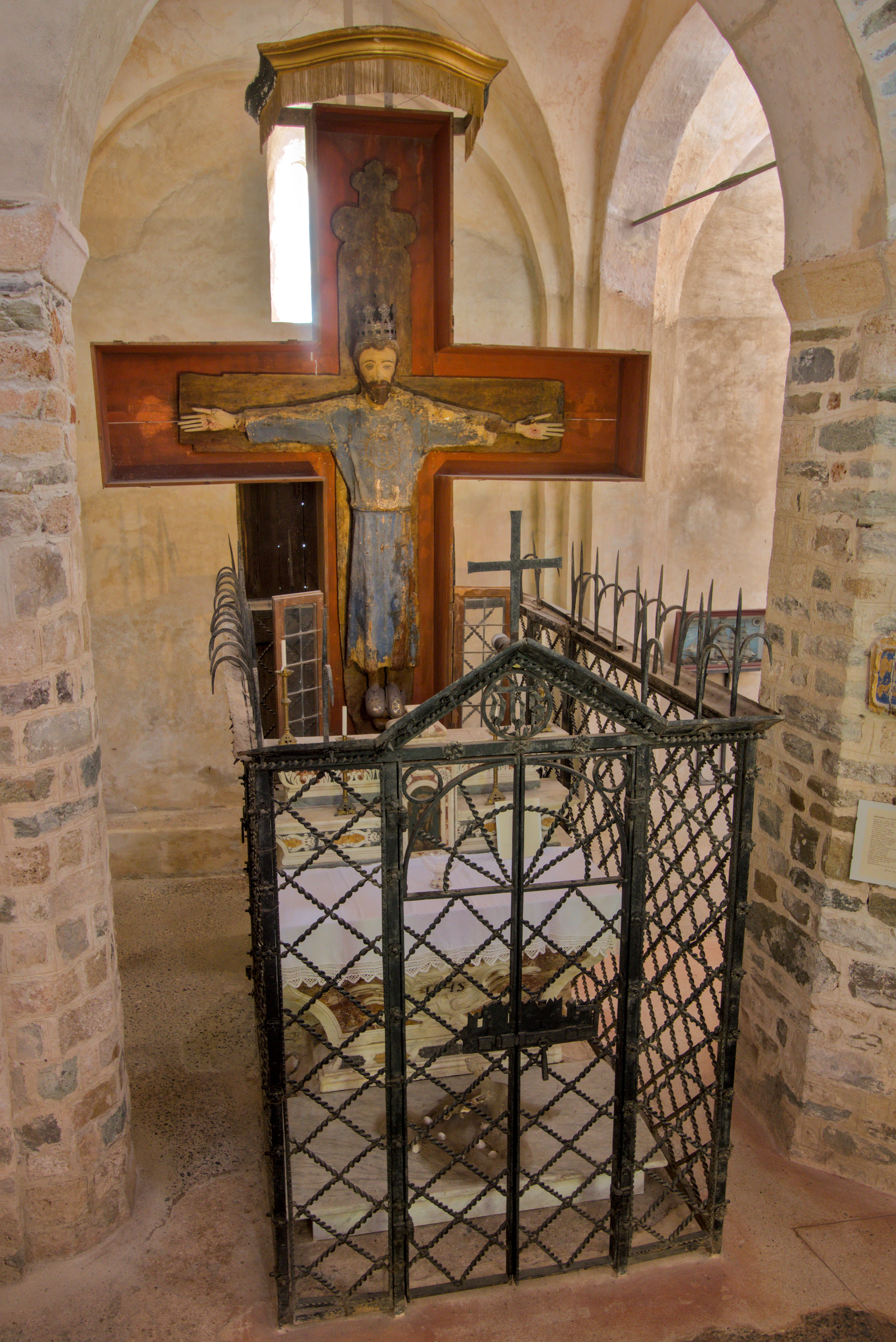
Romanesque wooden Christ

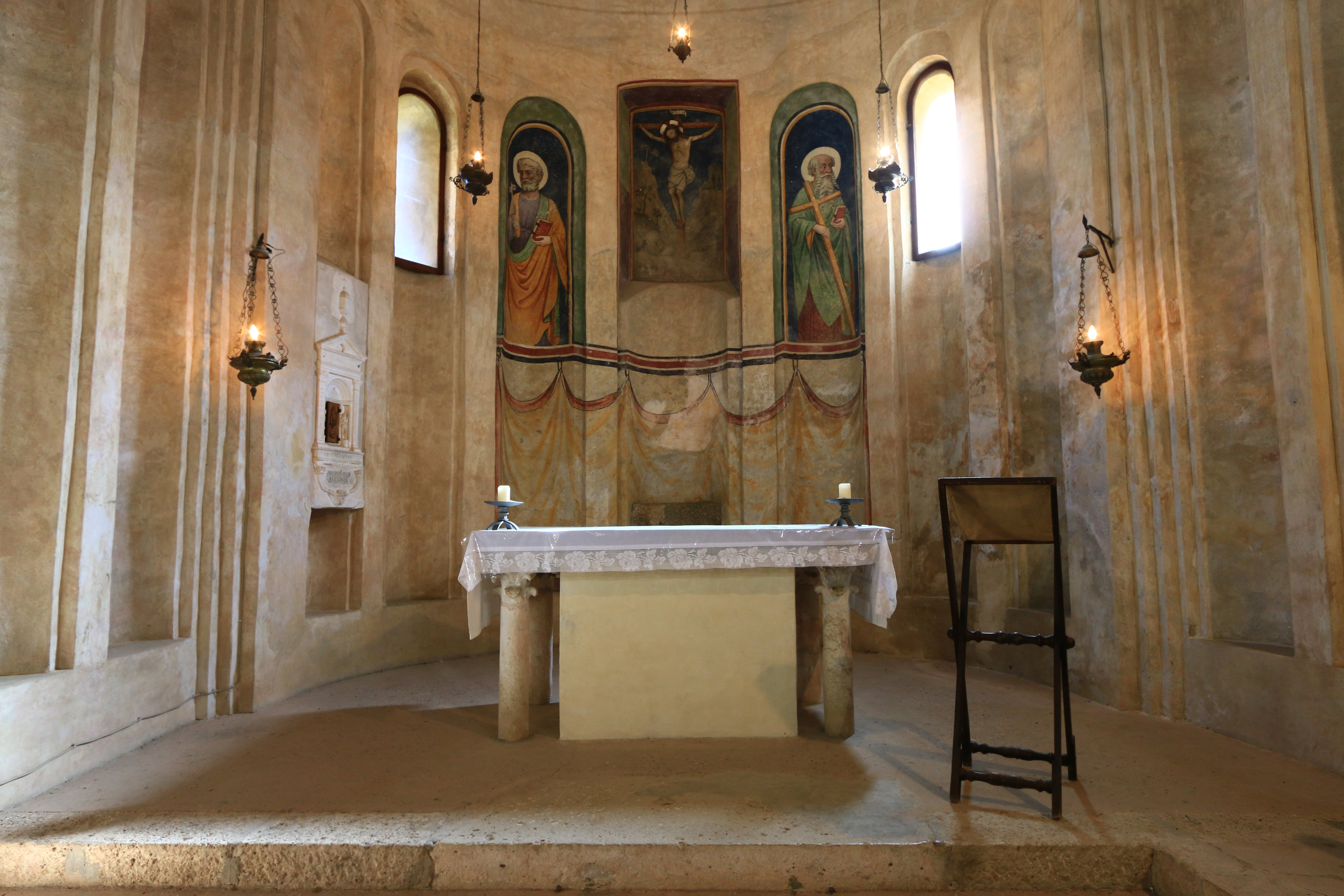
Romanesque choir

== Sources ==
- Lamboglia, N. (1973), "Gli scavi di S. Paragorio e il problema delle origini di Noli," (in Italian) Rivista di Studi Liguri (1973), pp. 64–71.
- Varaldo, C. (1978). La chiesa di S. Paragorio a Noli e la zona archeologica, (in Italian). Savona 1978.

=== External links ===
- Official site of the church
