= Tovo =

Tovo may refer to a pair of Italian municipalities:

- Tovo di Sant'Agata, in the Province of Sondrio, Lombardy
- Tovo San Giacomo, in the Province of Savona, Liguria
