= Rialto (disambiguation) =

Rialto is a neighbourhood in Venice, Italy.

Rialto may also refer to:

== Places ==
=== Ireland ===
- Rialto, Dublin, a neighbourhood

=== Italy ===
- Rialto, Liguria, a town in Liguria, Italy

=== United States ===
- Rialto, California, a city in San Bernardino County, California
- Rialto, Manhattan, a 19th-century theatrical district in New York City
- Rialto Beach, a beach on the Pacific Coast of Washington state

== Buildings, venues and structures ==
- Rialto (Portland, Oregon), a café in Portland, Oregon
- Rialto Bridge, a bridge spanning the Grand Canal in Venice, Italy
- Rialto Cinema, Dunedin, a cinema in Dunedin, New Zealand
- Rialto Theater (disambiguation), various theaters
- Rialto Towers, a skyscraper in Melbourne, Australia

== Businesses ==
- Rialto Channel, a New Zealand television channel
- Rialto Film, a German motion-picture production company
- Event Cinemas (Rialto Cinemas), a New Zealand cinema chain

== Literature ==
- The Rialto (poetry magazine), a poetry magazine in the United Kingdom
- The Rialto Report, a podcast and article series documenting the Golden Age of Porn (1969–1984)

== Other uses ==
- Rialto (band), an English rock band
- Rialto (film), a 2019 film by Peter Mackie Burns
- Reliant Rialto, a three-wheeled car produced by the Reliant Motor Company
- "At the Rialto", a short story by American writer Connie Willis published in 1989
