= Calice Ligure =

- Comune
- Comune di Calice Ligure
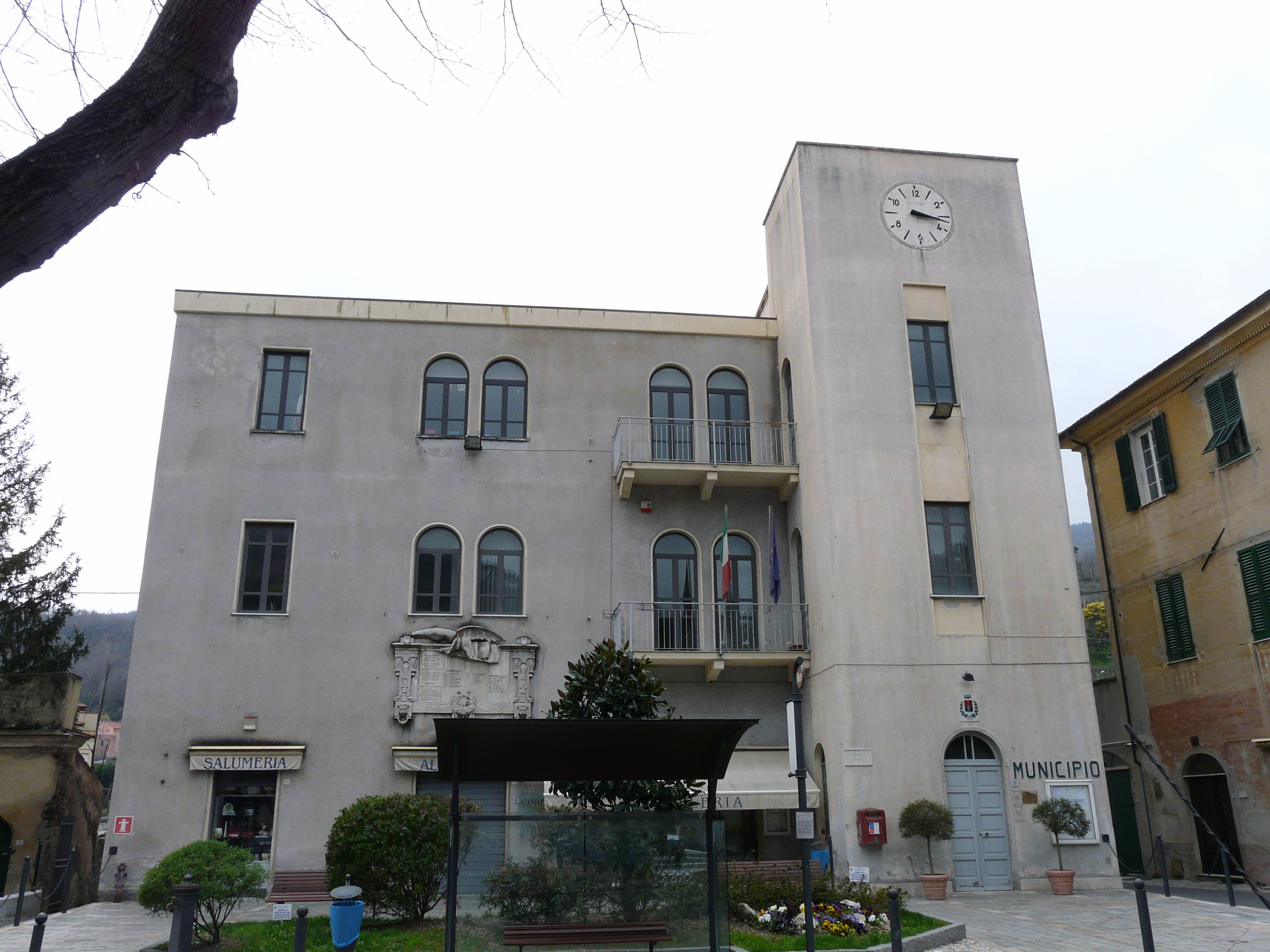
- Town hall

- Coat of arms

- Location within Italy Location within Liguria
- Coordinates: 44°12′N 8°18′E
- Country: Italy
- Region: Liguria
- Province: Savona (SV)

Government
  - Mayor: Alessandro Comi

Area
  - Total: 20.6 km^{2} (8.0 sq mi)
- Elevation: 70 m (230 ft)

Population (30 April 2017)
  - Total: 1,717
  - Density: 83.3/km^{2} (216/sq mi)
- Demonym: Calicesi
- Time zone: UTC+1 (CET)
  - Summer (DST): UTC+2 (CEST)
- Postal code: 17020
- Dialing code: 019
- Website: Official website

Calice Ligure (Ligurian: Carxi or Corxi) is a comune (municipality) in the Province of Savona in the Italian region Liguria, located about 60 kilometres (37 mi) southwest of Genoa and about 20 kilometres (12 mi) southwest of Savona.

Calice Ligure borders the following municipalities: Bormida, Finale Ligure, Mallare, Orco Feglino, Rialto, and Tovo San Giacomo.
