= Richard Oseran =

American lawyer and businessman (born 1945)

- Born: May 8, 1945 (age 81); Phoenix, Arizona, U.S.
- Education: University of Arizona
- Known for: Law; Philanthropy, businessman
- Spouse: Shana Oseran (m. 1979)
- Children: 3

Richard S. Oseran is an Arizona-born Jewish American lawyer and entrepreneur. A third-generation Arizonan, Oseran practiced law for many years, which included arguing before the U.S. Supreme Court. He and his wife Shana have been instrumental in the early 21st-century revitalization of Downtown Tucson, Arizona. Together, they redeveloped the boutique historic Hotel Congress, the Cup Café, Club Congress, and Maynards' Market & Kitchen.

== Early life and family ==
Oseran was born in Phoenix, Arizona, on May 8, 1945, to Alan and Bess Oseran. In 1963, he moved to Tucson, Arizona, to attend the University of Arizona and the University of Arizona James E. Rogers College of Law.

Oseran's grandfather, Jacob Oseransky, started the Arizona Furniture Store in Phoenix, Arizona. His mother, Bess Samuels, was born in Douglas, Arizona, in 1916. The Oseran family sold guns to Pancho Villa during the Mexican revolution and were arrested but the charges later dropped.

== Career ==
In the early 1980s, Oseran practiced civil litigation; he ended his job as public defender for Pima County on July 1, 1981.

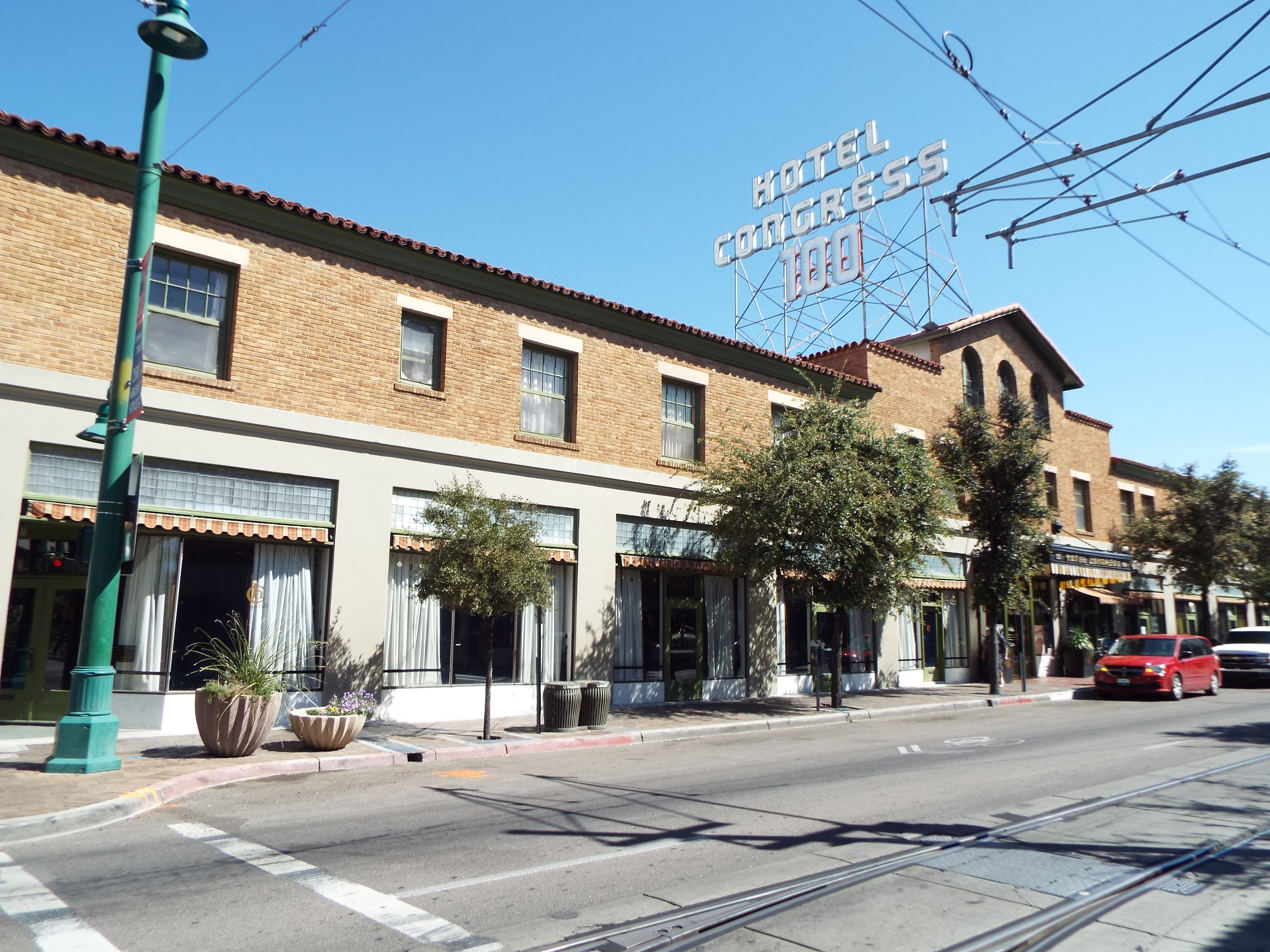
Hotel Congress in 2019

In 1985, Oseran and his wife purchased Hotel Congress with business partners and later become the sole owners. Within the hotel, they created Club Congress as a venue for alternative music and Cup Cafe. The Hotel Congress has become a cultural touchstone in downtown Tucson. In 2008, the Oserans started Maynard's Market & Kitchen at a restored railroad depot across the street; they closed the restaurant, at least for the summer, in 2025.

In 1992, Hotel Congress initiated Dillinger Days, a festival focusing on gangster John Dillinger's capture in relation to a 1934 fire at the hotel. In 2003, Dillinger's great-nephew Jeffery Scalf was the keynote speaker at the event. In 2007, Scalf sued Oseran, saying he owns the use of Dillinger's persona. Oseran got the case moved from Indiana state court to a federal court in Tucson, while he sought to have the lawsuit dismissed.

In 2023, Arizona governor Katie Hobbs appointed Oseran as one of four new directors of the board for Tucson's Rio Nuevo business district.

== Personal life ==
Richard and Shana were married in 1979, after which they visited New Zealand for a year. They have three daughters.

From 2002 through 2020, Oseran made political contributions consistently to Democratic campaigns.
