= Rialto Theater =

Rialto Theatre may refer to:

== Canada ==
- Rialto Theatre (Montreal), a former theatre that is a National Historic Site of Canada
- Rialto Theatre (Ottawa), 1943–1991; demolished 1991, within one year of acquisition by Cineplex Odeon and renaming as "The Phoenix"

== Netherlands ==
- Rialto (theater), a theatre in Amsterdam's De Pijp neighborhood.

== United States ==
=== Arizona ===
- Rialto Theatre (Tucson, Arizona), a performing arts venue in Tucson, Arizona, listed on the NRHP in Arizona

=== Arkansas ===
- Rialto Theatre (El Dorado, Arkansas), listed on the NRHP in Arkansas
- Rialto Theater (Morrilton, Arkansas)
- Rialto Theater (Searcy, Arkansas), listed on the National Register of Historic Places (NRHP) in Arkansas

=== California ===
- Rialto Theater (Los Angeles), part of the historic Broadway Theater District
- Rialto Cinemas, three California movie theaters in Berkeley, El Cerrito, and Sebastopol
- Rialto Theatre (South Pasadena, California), listed on the NRHP in California

=== Colorado ===
- Rialto Theater (Loveland, Colorado), listed on the NRHP in Colorado

=== Florida ===
- Rialto Theatre (Tampa, Florida), built in 1926 and part of the NRHP listed Upper North Franklin Street Commercial District

=== Georgia ===
- Rialto Center for the Arts, a theatre at Georgia State University, Atlanta
- Rialto Theater (Augusta, Georgia), opened September 23, 1918.

=== Illinois ===
- Rialto Square Theatre, Joliet, Illinois, known also as Rubens Rialto Square Theater, listed on the NRHP in Illinois

=== Indiana ===
- Rialto Theater (Fort Wayne, Indiana)

=== Kentucky ===
- Rialto Theater (Louisville, Kentucky)

=== Louisiana ===
- Dixie Center for the Arts, formerly the Rialto Theater in Ruston

=== Montana ===
- Rialto Theater (Deer Lodge, Montana), listed on the NRHP in Montana
- Rialto (Bozeman, MT), a live music and community event venue in Bozeman, MT.

=== Nebraska ===
- Rialto Theater (Omaha, Nebraska)

=== New Jersey ===
- Rialto (Westfield, New Jersey)

=== New York ===
- Rialto Theater (Monticello, New York), listed on the NRHP in New York
- Rialto Theatre (New York City) was a movie palace and later a theatrical performance space at 1481 Broadway that operated from 1916 to 2002

=== North Carolina ===
- The Rialto (Raleigh, North Carolina)

=== Texas ===
- Rialto Theater (Aransas Pass, Texas), a performing arts and music venue on the south Texas Coast
- Rialto Theater (Beeville, Texas), listed on the NRHP in Texas
- Rialto Theater (San Antonio, Texas)

=== Washington ===
- Rialto Theater (Tacoma, Washington), listed on the NRHP in Washington

=== Wyoming ===
- Rialto Theater (Casper, Wyoming), listed on the NRHP in Wyoming

== See also ==
- Rialto (disambiguation)
