= Giustenice =

- Comune
- Comune di Giustenice
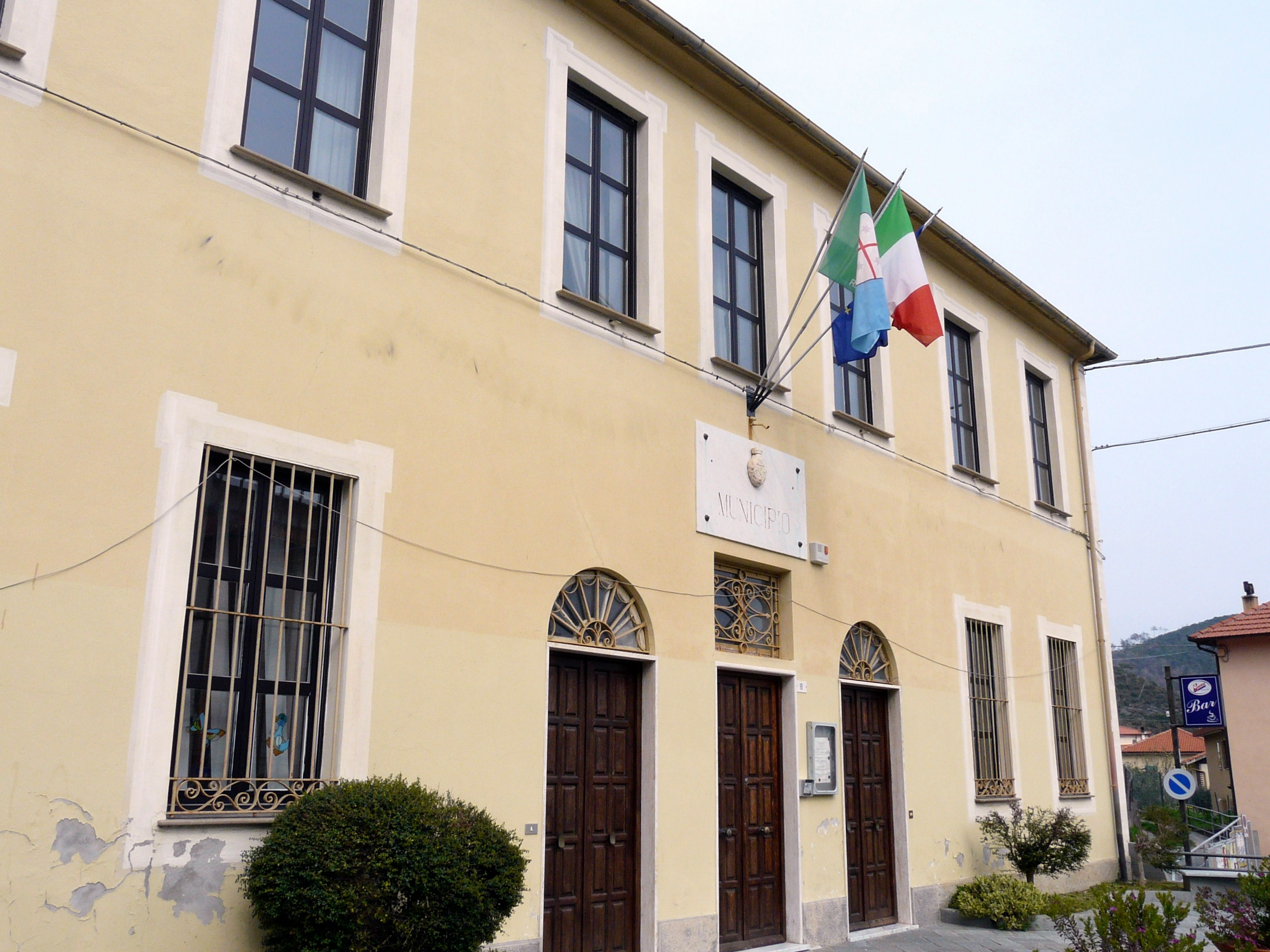
- Town hall

- Location within Italy Location within Liguria
- Coordinates: 44°10′N 8°15′E
- Country: Italy
- Region: Liguria
- Province: Savona (SV)

Government
  - Mayor: Mauro Boetto

Area
  - Total: 17.22 km^{2} (6.65 sq mi)
- Elevation: 140 m (460 ft)

Population (31 August 2017)
  - Total: 989
  - Density: 57.4/km^{2} (149/sq mi)
- Demonym: Giusteniesi
- Time zone: UTC+1 (CET)
  - Summer (DST): UTC+2 (CEST)
- Postal code: 17020
- Dialing code: 019
- Website: Official website

Giustenice (Ligurian: Giustexine or Giüstexine) is a comune (municipality) in the Province of Savona in the Italian region Liguria, located about 60 kilometres (37 mi) southwest of Genoa and about 25 kilometres (16 mi) southwest of Savona.

Giustenice borders the following municipalities: Bardineto, Magliolo, Pietra Ligure, and Tovo San Giacomo.

== Geography ==
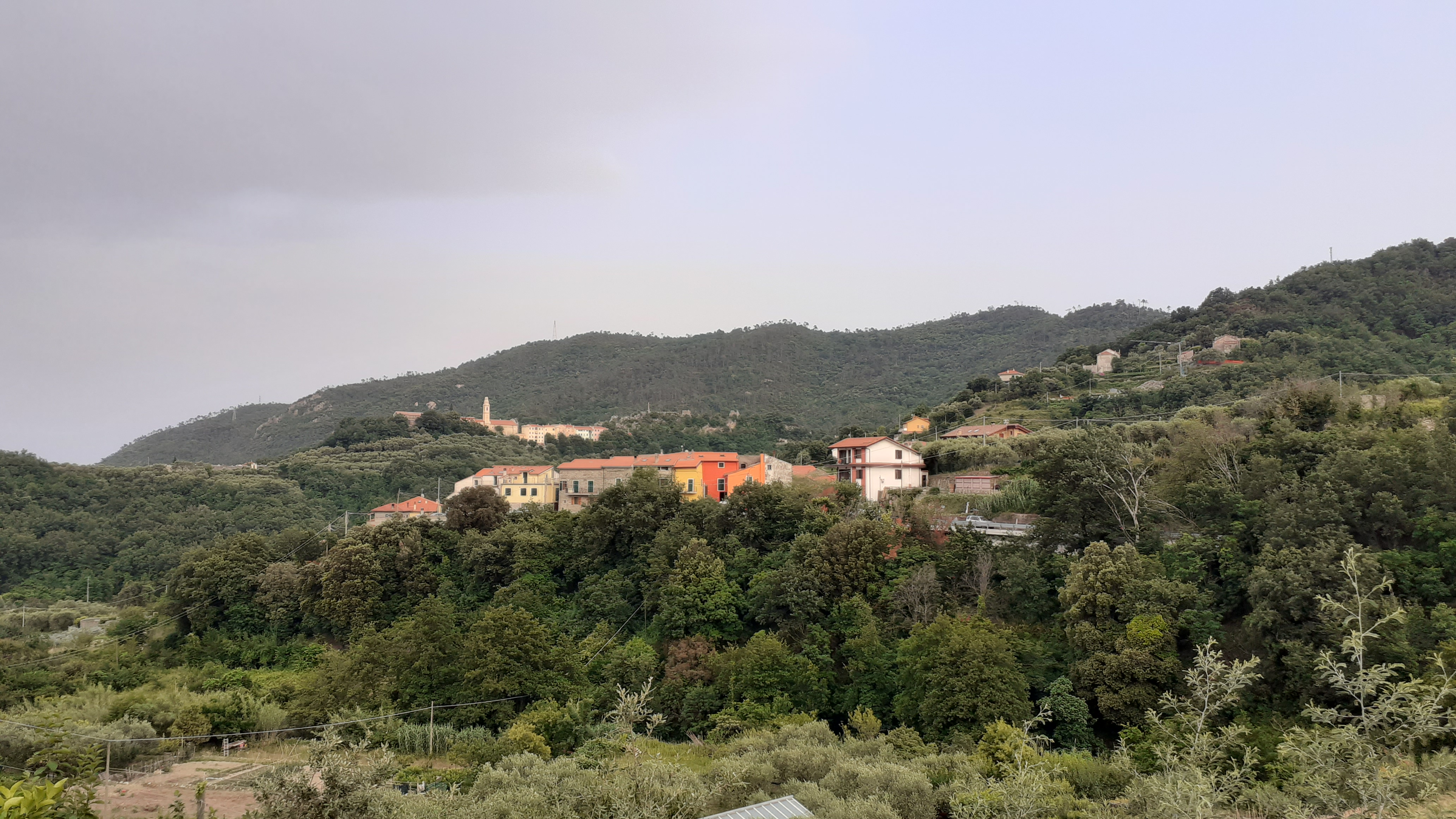
View of San Michele historic centre

The territory of Giustenice it's located in the Maremola Valley, along Scaincio stream. The highest mountains around the town are Monte Carmo (1389 meters), Bric Agnellino (1335 m) and Giovo di Giustenice (1200 m).

Giustenice is composed of a lot of small localities: San Lorenzo and San Michele are the most importants, the others are Besso, Vìlla, Vilétta (linked to San Lorenzo) and Costa, Valsorda, Foresto, Pianazzo e Serrati (linked to San Michele).
