= Magliolo =

- Comune
- Comune di Magliolo
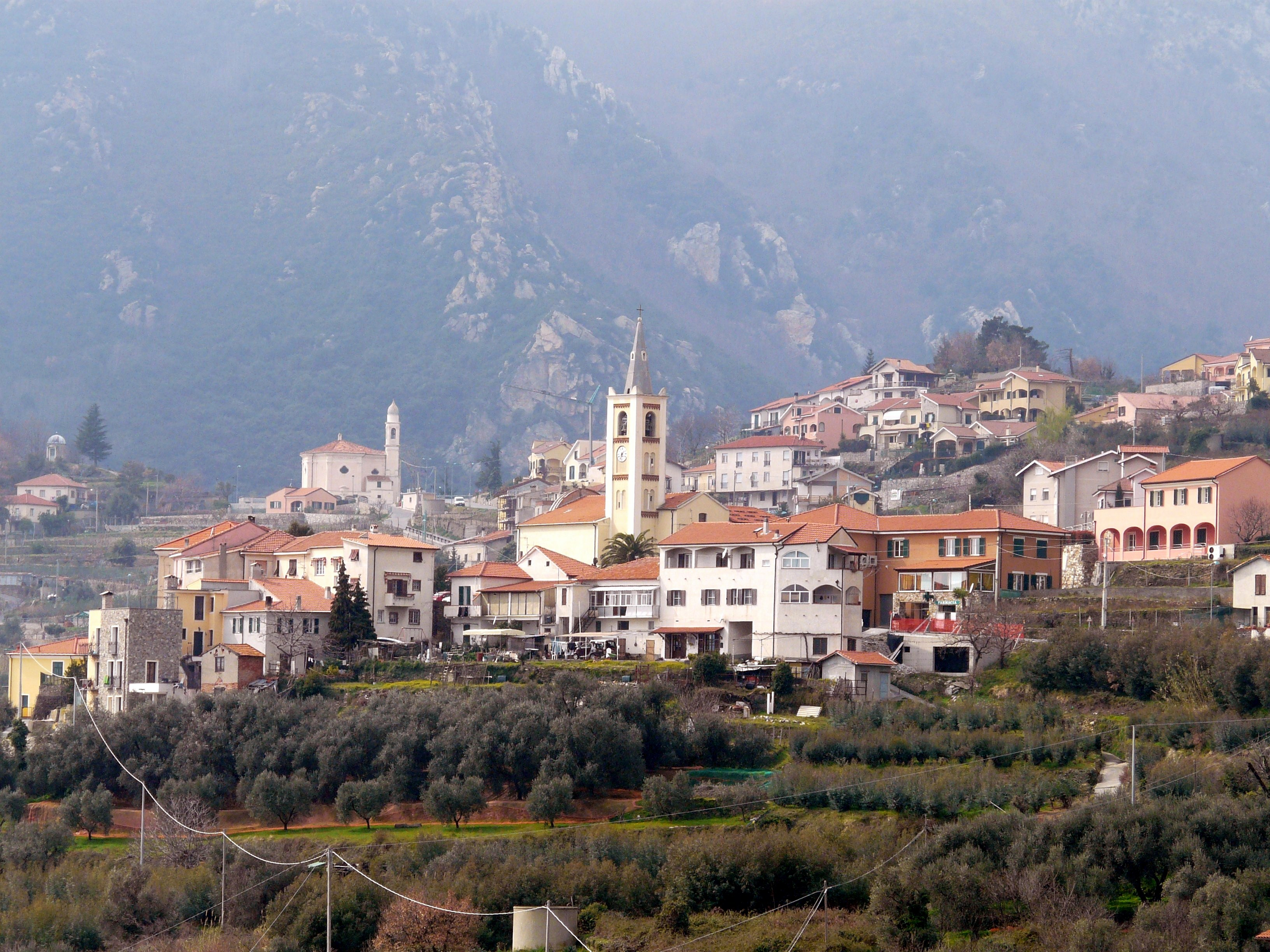
- Magliolo

- Coat of arms

- Location within Italy Location within Liguria
- Coordinates: 44°12′N 8°15′E
- Country: Italy
- Region: Liguria
- Province: Savona (SV)

Government
  - Mayor: Enrico Lanfranco

Area
  - Total: 19.2 km^{2} (7.4 sq mi)
- Elevation: 270 m (890 ft)

Population (30 September 2017)
  - Total: 972
  - Density: 50.6/km^{2} (131/sq mi)
- Demonym: Magliolesi
- Time zone: UTC+1 (CET)
  - Summer (DST): UTC+2 (CEST)
- Postal code: 17020
- Dialing code: 019
- Website: Official website

Magliolo (Ligurian: Majeu) is a comune (municipality) in the Province of Savona in the Italian region Liguria, located about 60 kilometres (37 mi) southwest of Genoa and about 20 kilometres (12 mi) southwest of Savona.

Magliolo borders the following municipalities: Bardineto, Calizzano, Giustenice, Rialto, and Tovo San Giacomo.
