= Fox Tucson Theatre =

Historic performance space in Tucson, Arizona, US

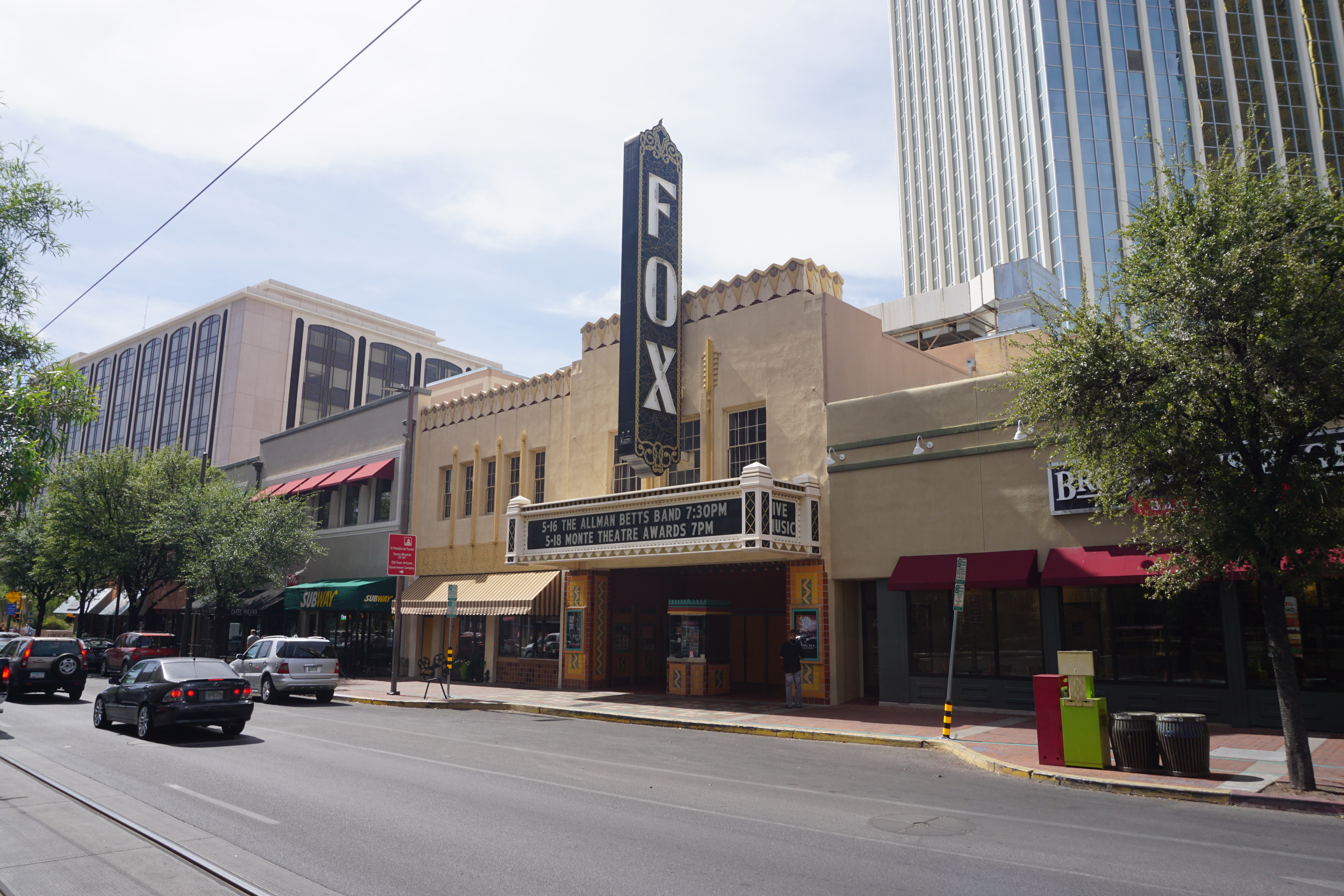
- Fox Theatre in 2019
- Interactive map of Fox Tucson Theatre
- Address: 17 W. Congress St. Tucson, Arizona; United States
- Owner: Fox Tucson Theatre Foundation
- Operator: Fox West Coast Theatres (1930–1970), National General Corporation (1970–1973), Mann Theatres (1973–1974), City Of Tucson (2005–present)
- Capacity: 1,197
- Type: Movie palace
- Screen: 1
- Public transit: Tucson Sun Link at Congress & Stone and Broadway & Stone

Construction
- Opened: April 11, 1930
- Reopened: 2005

Website
- www.foxtucsontheatre.org
- Fox Theatre
- U.S. National Register of Historic Places
- Location within Arizona Location within the United States
- Coordinates: 32°13′25″N 110°58′18″W
- Area: 0.8 acres (0.32 ha)
- Built: 1929
- Architect: M. Eugene Durfee
- Architectural style: Art Deco
- MPS: Downtown Tucson, Arizona MPS
- NRHP reference No.: 03000905
- Added to NRHP: September 12, 2003

The Fox Tucson Theatre is located in downtown Tucson, Arizona, United States. The theater opened on April 11, 1930 as a performance space in downtown Tucson. It hosts a wide spectrum of events and concerts featuring a variety of performing talent, ranging from ballets, to jazz, contemporary pop, world music and rock acts.

== History ==
The Fox, originally to be called "The Tower", was built in 1929 by The Diamos Family for their Southern Arizona "Lyric Amusement" chain of theaters. Other theaters owned by the Diamos family included the Plaza Theater in Tucson and the Grand Theatre in Douglas. Before the Tower's completion, Fox offered to buy the theater, threatening to build a larger theatre and make its films exclusive to that theatre if the Diamos's did not sell. Diamos sold the theatre but was given a contract to manage it.

The Fox Tucson Theatre is located in the heart of downtown Tucson, Arizona. The theater, a 1,200 seat 30,000-square-foot (2,800 m^{2}) structure, is the only known example of a Southwestern Art Deco movie palace.

The Fox Theatre was originally designed to be a dual vaudeville/movie house that would include a stage, a full fly loft, and dressing rooms underneath the stage. Due to the Great Depression and the up-and-coming "talkies", there were limited opportunities to hold live plays and performances, and as such, the dressing rooms were never completed. By the time the Fox Theatre's construction was completed, the overall budget increased from $200,000 to $300,000, including the furnishings.

It opened on April 11, 1930, and closed on June 18, 1974. Original programming at the theater included; movies, community events, vaudeville performances and the Tucson chapter of the Mickey Mouse Club. Although the popular Mickey Mouse Club was open to all children of Tucson, all other theater programming was segregated and African American theatergoers were required to sit in the back balcony, as recalled by Tucsonian Flyod Thompson. The building, listed on the National Register of Historic Places as a "Nationally Significant Structure" is so listed due to its unique decor and special acoustical treatment, 'Acoustone', designed due to the advent of "Talkie" movies, and is the only known example of the material in existence.

On opening night, April 11, 1930, 3,000 people were privileged with Congress Street closed and waxed for dancing, four live bands, a live radio broadcast and free trolley rides downtown. Films inside the Fox Theater were also played. Chasing Rainbows, a Movietone short, and a Mickey Mouse cartoon were well received by both audiences that evening.

Competition from other venues, drive-ins and television conspired to end the run of popularity the Fox had enjoyed. Partial remodels of the theater left it with most of its original details, but vanishing retail and housing downtown spelled the end in 1974. Various efforts to revive the theatre were unsuccessful, but the property was spared the wrecking ball.

== Restoration ==
After sitting empty for 25 years, the theater, which had become home to over 40 homeless people, was nearly beyond restoration. Extensive water damage, vandalism, and neglect had conspired to keep the building dark. The owners, who had planned to demolish the Fox for a future office building, had decided to let the building slowly decay and had little interest in selling the property to anyone. Following a two-year negotiation with the property owner, the non-profit Fox Tucson Theatre Foundation was able to purchase the building in 1999 for $250,000. Stabilization and planning for the rehabilitation/restoration began at once with a new roof being installed to stop further damage from the elements. Small restoration projects such as the repair and relighting of the original chandeliers kept the community engaged—through bi-annual open houses and special event fund-raisers. Following a six-year, $13 million rehabilitation the theatre reopened on December 31, 2005.

Elements of the restoration/rehabilitation included:

- Decorative plaster and mural restoration throughout the building
- Repair to the unique original 'Acoustone' acoustic material
- Recreation of original seat fabric, carpet pattern and light fixtures from surviving examples and photographs
- New theatrical systems (light, sound, projection) to better serve the performing arts community both locally and for touring productions
- As the theater fills an important niche in the community due to its seating capacity, the local and national performing arts community were eager for its return. Programming at the theatre includes performances of Dance, Theater, Music and Film, children's activities and community events as well as private corporate rentals.

=== Project funding ===
The Fox Tucson Theatre restoration was funded by a partnership of public and private dollars, and was the second historic theater in the country to utilize the combined Historic Preservation Tax Credits and New Markets Tax Credits. Additional funding came from the City of Tucson, the United States Government, the State of Arizona, TIF funding, as well as private donations and grants. This unique combination of funding became a model for other historic properties to follow, and the key players involved in the restoration offer their experience to other projects through workshops and one-on-one consultations.

=== Community support ===
The community support for the project was another key aspect of its success. Over 200 volunteers were involved, and the all-volunteer Board of Directors of the Fox Tucson Theatre Foundation worked tirelessly to complete the project in support of a small paid professional staff (three full-time positions). Faced with stiff competition from other local, worthy charity activities, and, National/International philanthropy needs, the project managed to raise just under $1 million annually towards its goal for five years. Rising construction cost escalated the cost by nearly $500,000 annually, at which point the final City of Tucson Bond funding package was completed and approved by a 6–0 vote by the Mayor and Council in order to finish the Fox in 2005.

=== Impact ===
The impact of the reopened Fox Tucson Theatre in downtown Tucson, as well as the impact on Southern Arizona as a whole, is profound. The Fox is on track to host over 100 events annually, and will see over 100,000 patrons each year. Associated sales tax revenue, increases in retail and restaurant business as well as parking revenue to the downtown area will be unmatched by any other preservation project to date.

Key personnel in the project included:

- John A Hill – Architect-Project Lead
- Herb Stratford – Original Fox Tucson Theatre Foundation Executive Director, Fox Tucson Theatre Foundation Founder
- Fox Tucson Theatre Foundation Board of Directors
- City of Tucson, Arizona Mayor and Council
- Rio Nuevo Multipurpose Facilities District (City of Tucson TIF project)
- Congressman Jim Kolbe
- B.C. McKinney – Technical Director during reconstruction

The Fox Tucson Theatre Foundation (FTTF) was incorporated in July 1999 and was formed for the express purpose of returning the theatre to the community. The Foundation is an Arizona 501(c)(3) non-profit organization formed out of the citizen's group known as the Fox Theatre Revival Committee, which began looking at ways to save the theater in 1997. This group was composed of people who wanted to see the theater restored, and re-opened. The stated mission of the Foundation is the purchase, restoration, renovation, and operation of the historic Fox Tucson Theatre. The Foundation is guided by a professional staff and is overseen by a volunteer Board of Directors.

== Gallery ==
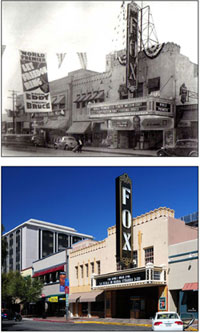
Fox Theatre, then and now

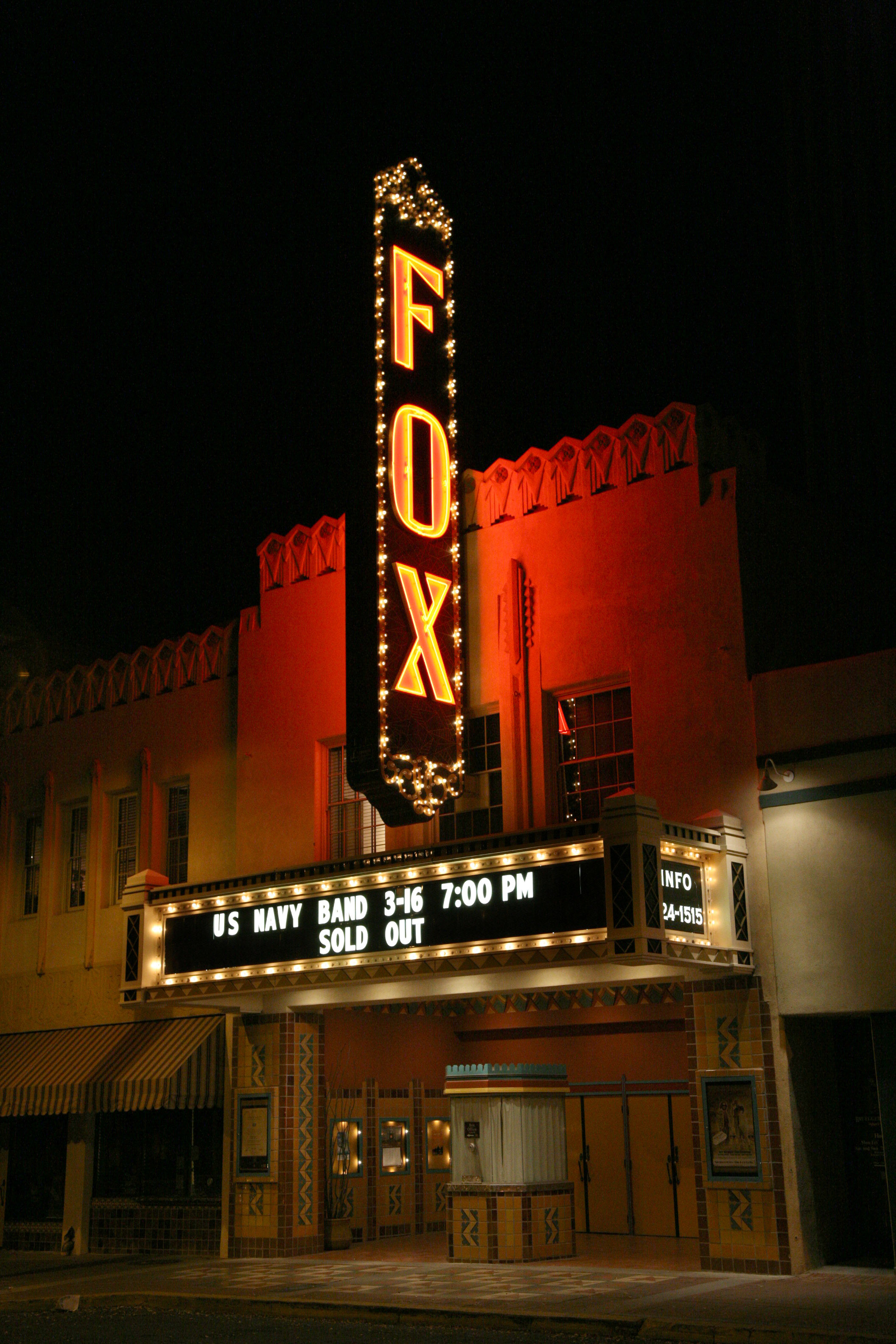
The theatre at night in 2007

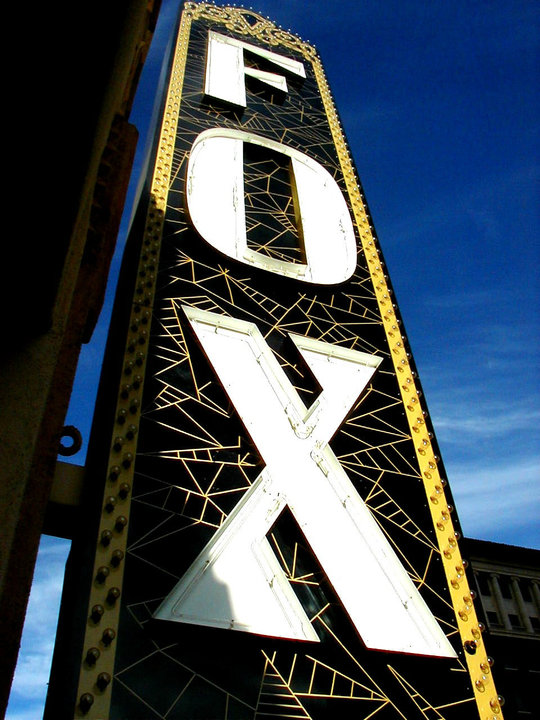
Fox Theatre Marquee

== See also ==
- Rialto Theatre (Arizona)
- Plaza Theater (Tucson)
