= Pietra Ligure =

- Comune
- Comune di Pietra Ligure
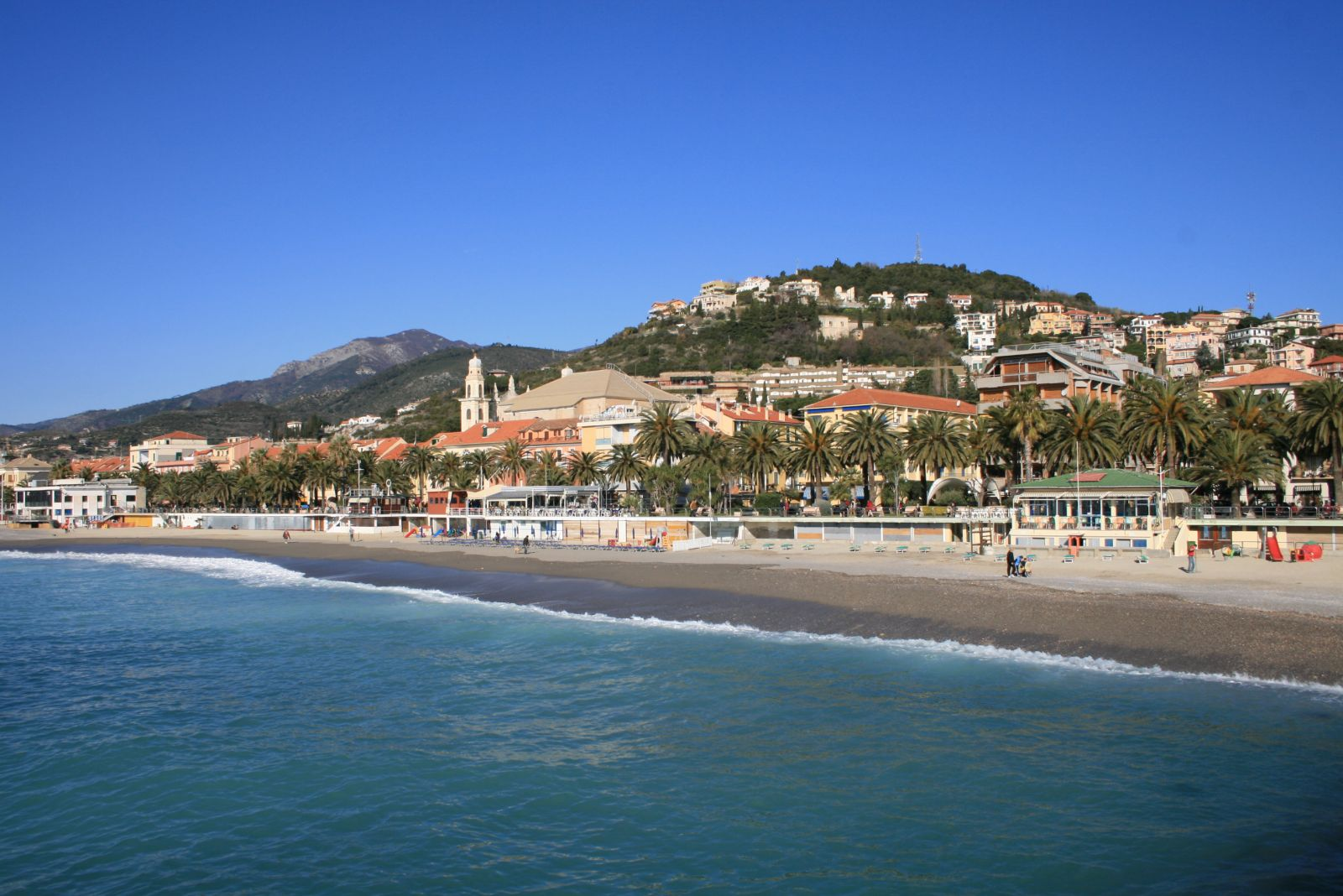
- Pietra Ligure

- Coat of arms

- Location within Italy Location within Liguria
- Coordinates: 44°9′N 8°18′E
- Country: Italy
- Region: Liguria
- Province: Savona (SV)
- Frazioni: Ranzi

Government
  - Mayor: Luigi De Vincenzi

Area
  - Total: 9.88 km^{2} (3.81 sq mi)
- Elevation: 3 m (9.8 ft)

Population (31 May 2022)
  - Total: 8,277
  - Density: 838/km^{2} (2,170/sq mi)
- Demonym: Pietresi
- Time zone: UTC+1 (CET)
  - Summer (DST): UTC+2 (CEST)
- Postal code: 17027
- Dialing code: 019
- Website: Official website

Pietra Ligure (Ligurian: A Prïa) is a resort town and comune (municipality) in the Province of Savona in the Italian region Liguria, located about 60 kilometres (37 mi) southwest of Genoa and about 20 kilometres (12 mi) southwest of Savona. It is mainly a touristic city.

Pietra Ligure borders the following municipalities: Bardineto, Boissano, Borgio Verezzi, Giustenice, Loano, and Tovo San Giacomo.

== Twin towns ==
Pietra Ligure is twinned with:

- Offenburg, Germany, since 2007

== History ==
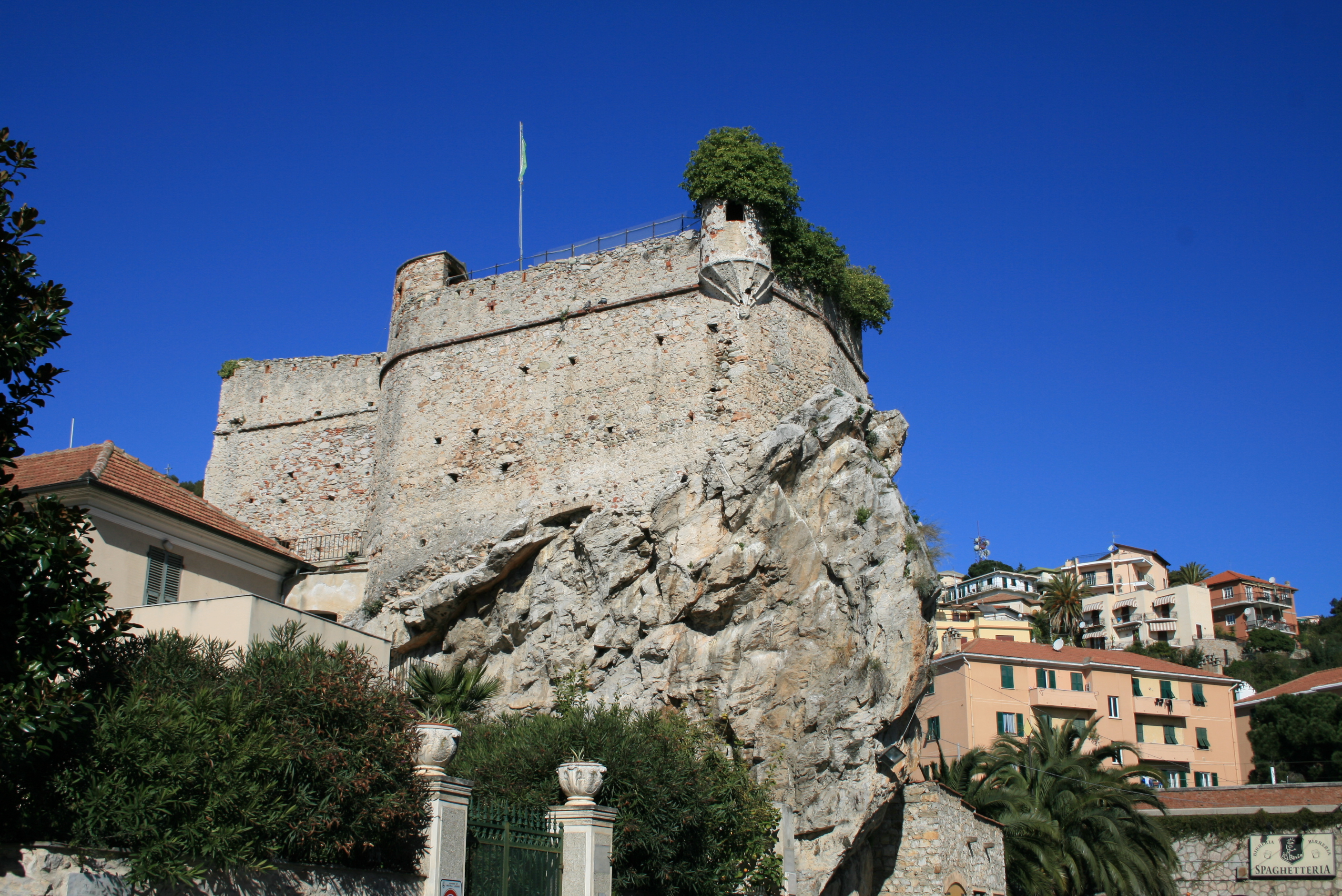
Pietra Ligure's castle

Pietra Ligure is named after its castle, Castrum et Oppidum Petrae, il "castello di pietra" (stone castle), built between the 7th and 8th century.
