= Plaza Theater (Tucson) =

Former theater in Arizona

Coordinates: 32.221890°N 110.973131°W

The Plaza Theater was the crowning jewel of 1920s development on West Congress Street in Tucson and the only indoor Spanish language theater in Southern Arizona. The theater was designed by renowned local Tucson architect Roy Place in 1930 for A. Kaufman a local commercial developer and pioneer merchant and leased to Los Angeles theater operator Joe Gross. Kaufman declared the night before opening that he;

"regarded the Plaza as Tucson's own theater, since all local employes [sic] had been hired for the construction of the building with equipment and contracting coming from Tucson sources whenever possible."

Built on the corner of West Congress and Plaza Streets (later Court Avenue) the exterior was constructed in a Spanish Revival style with cast ornamental details framing the upper windows and red clay barrel roof tiles. The ground floor included two commercial storefronts. By the 1940s the original marquee had been enlarged and the lower level window and door configuration changed. The decorative cast terracotta Spanish revival details and original neon sign remained intact.

The interior decorations were described at the time of opening as "being typical of the old southwest motif. The auditorium will have seating capacity of 650 and will be modern in every respect with ample heating, ventilating and cooling systems. Acoustic plastering will be used throughout and is designed along the most modern methods for the projection of sound pictures." When constructed the building had a state-of-the-art RCA projector and sound equipment, "the walls lined with a highly absorbent material to insure perfect acoustics."

The theater was purchased by Arizona 'theater czar' Nick Diamos, also the owner of the Tucson Lyric Theater and involved in the development of Tucson's Fox Theatre. Artist Ted DeGrazia was the theater manager for three years in the late 1930s.

At the time of demolition the Plaza was owned by Abelardo M. Campillo and Jesus M. Granillo. The last owners were forced from their property by the City of Tucson and its urban renewal program. The owners reminded the city "that if the Plaza goes, nothing of the Old City will be left in the area."

The plaza was demolished on May 15, 1969.

== See also ==
- Rialto Theatre (Arizona)
- Fox Theatre (Tucson, Arizona)
