= Rialto Theatre (Tucson, Arizona) =

Historic performance venue

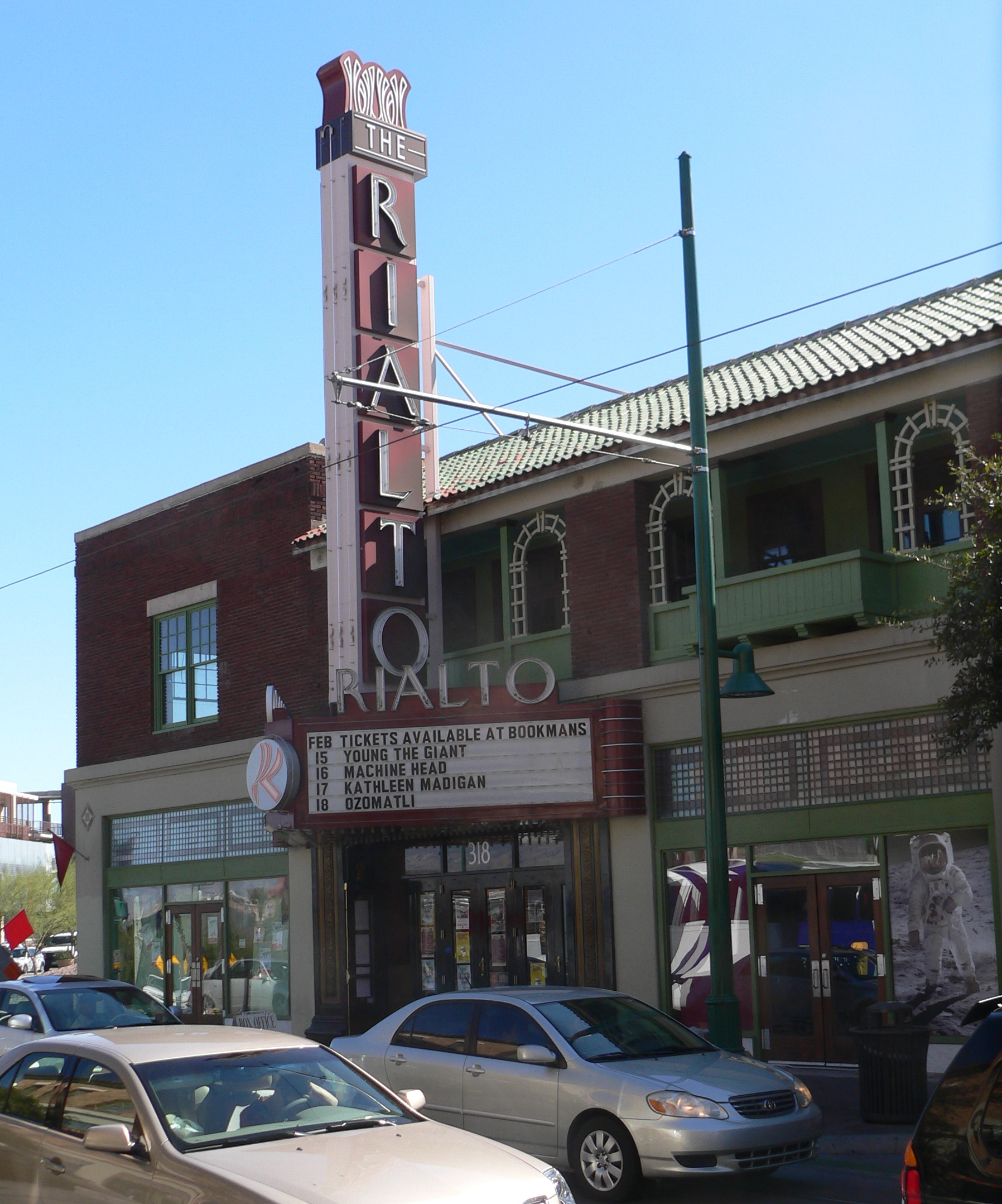
- The Rialto's marquee, facing Congress Street
- Interactive map of Rialto Theatre
- Address: 318 East Congress Street; Tucson, Arizona; United States
- Owner: City of Tucson
- Operator: Independent (1922–1929); (1971–1984); (1995–2004), Paramount Nace Theatres (1929–1949), AP Theatres (1949–1963), The Rialto Theatre Foundation (2004–present)
- Capacity: 1,400

Construction
- Opened: 1922

Website
- www.rialtotheatre.com
- Rialto Theatre
- U.S. National Register of Historic Places
- Location within Arizona Location within the United States
- Coordinates: 32°13′19″N 110°57′59″W
- Architect: Alexander Curlett; William Curlett & Son
- Architectural style: Art Nouveau
- MPS: Downtown Tucson, Arizona MPS
- NRHP reference No.: 03000909
- Added to NRHP: September 12, 2003

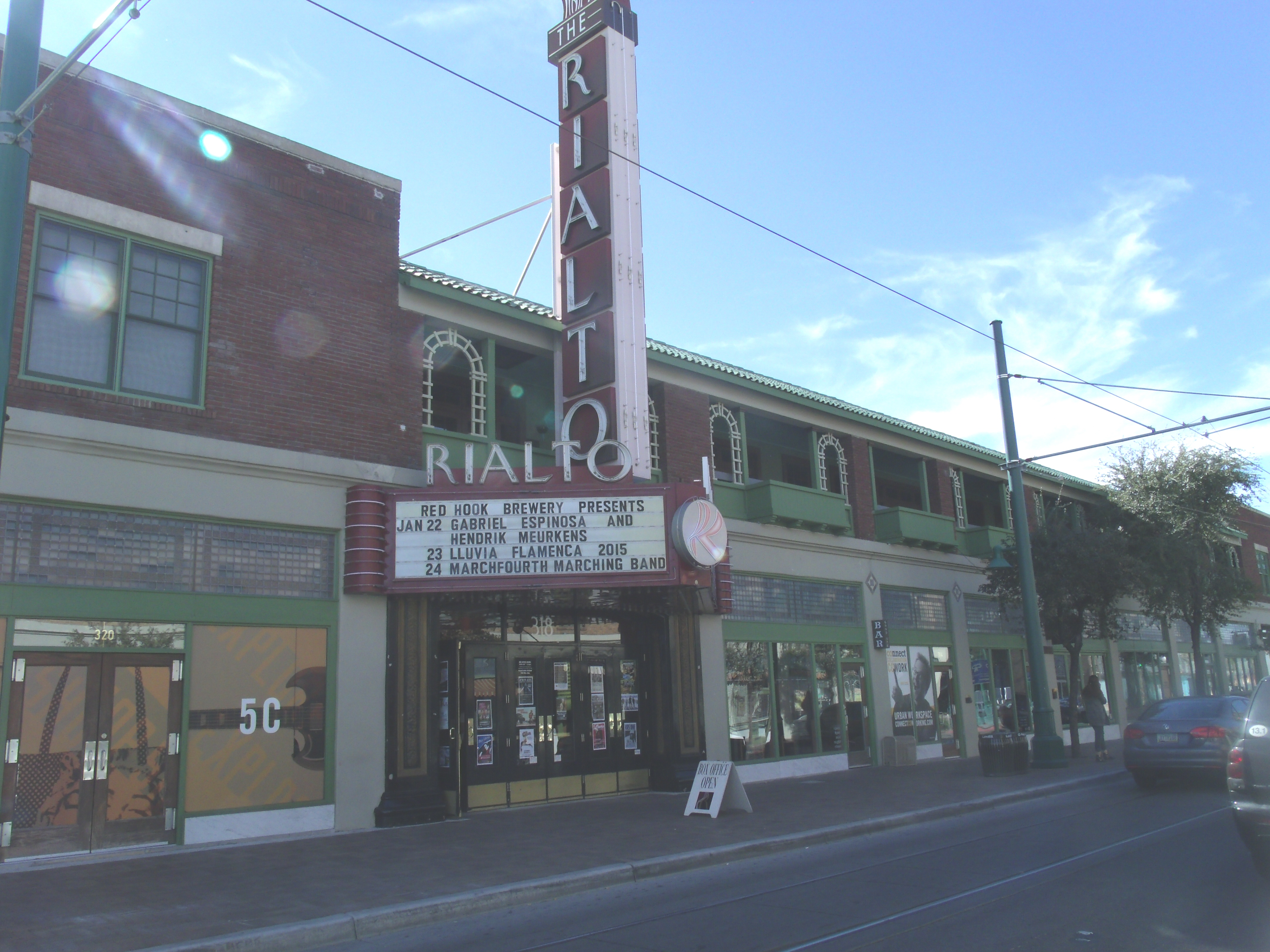
The Rialto Theater, and Rialto Building commercial block.

The Rialto Theatre is a performance theater and concert venue located on Congress Street in downtown Tucson, Pima County, southern Arizona. The cinema−theater and surrounding Rialto Building commercial block were listed on the National Register of Historic Places in 2003.

== Movie theater ==
First conceived of in the early-to-mid-1910s, The Rialto Theatre was built by William Curlett & Son, jointly with the neighboring Hotel Congress across the street. Upon its opening in 1920, The Rialto Theatre was one of Tucson's first movie theaters, playing primarily silent films per the time period. In addition, the theater was host to Vaudeville shows, another popular form of entertainment at the time. The first full-length film to play on the Rialto's screen was 'The Toll Gate'.

In 1929, the theater was bought out by Paramount-Publix, a theater-owning consortium that controlled a significant number of American movie theaters. By the 1930s, the Rialto was hosting talking pictures in addition to weekly Vaudeville shows and plays. During the Paramount-Publix period of ownership, the cinema was significantly revamped. This included buying new seating, new interior decorating, and the installation of evaporative cooling, a fixture which lasted in the theater until the early 21st century.

Around 1947 the theater's name was changed to The Paramount, reflecting its corporate ownership. Though the studio-movie theater monopoly was broken up by the Paramount Decree of the Supreme Court in 1948, it took many more years for Paramount Pictures to comply. Hence, the ownership would remain the same for at least another decade.

== Decline ==
In 1963, while downtown Tucson suffered a recession, The Paramount was closed as a motion-picture house, citing lack of sales, first-rate films, and a general demographic move away from downtown Tucson. From 1963 to 1971, the vacant theater served as storage for a furniture store.

In 1971, the Rialto suffered another name change, this time being re-christened El Cine Plaza. For a while, the theater was transformed into a strictly Spanish movie house, until 1973.

In 1973 it was resold again and re-opened as an adult theater, initially showing Deep Throat. Though the city of Tucson attempted to block The Rialto in its capacity as a venue showing adult films, and Annie Sprinkle had to appear in court as a witness. They were initially unsuccessful, and it remained in this capacity for five years.

During its run as an adult theater, there were several incidents of attempted arson, purportedly stemming from one offended local woman; she succeeded at one point in burning the balcony stairs in 1978, and was never caught.

In 1978, the theater was transformed once again into a Spanish-language cinema, still under the name El Cine Plaza, and continued showing Latino films until 1984, when a boiler explosion devastated the theater, collapsing the stage and resulting in the theater's condemnation.

== Concert venue ==
The theatre remained closed until 1995, when it was purchased by Paul Bear and Jeb Schoonover. The enterprising duo re-opened the theatre as a concert venue under the original name.

Bear and Schoonover hosted over 700 shows featuring a diverse range of acts such as The Black Crowes, Linkin Park, The White Stripes, Maroon 5, Dave Chappelle, Morrissey, Fugazi, Government Mule, Sam Butera, The Afro-Cuban Allstars, King Sunny Ade, Cesária Évora, Arturo Sandoval, Dwight Yoakam, Merle Haggard, The Vagina Monologues, Quest for Fire and even the Jim Rose Side Show.

In September 2004, Bear and Schoonover sold the theatre to the City of Tucson, as part of Rio Nuevo, a downtown revitalization project. The Rialto Theatre Foundation was founded in April 2004 by Tucson Weekly co-founder Douglas Biggers, who spearheaded the acquisition by the city and was the executive director of the project from mid-2004 until December 2011. During his tenure, the Rialto Theatre was listed on the National Register of Historic Places, more than $2 million in renovation and equipment improvements were made, and the theater was completely re-branded and re-launched in April 2005. The Rialto Theatre is now owned and operated by the Rialto Theatre Foundation. Curtis McCrary, who was the first employee hired by Biggers, became executive director when Biggers left at the end of 2011. McCrary resigned in August 2020.

The Rialto Theatre is one of several historic theater and concert venues built along Congress Street, the others being Club Congress (directly across the street) and the newly renovated Fox Theatre several blocks to the west.

Both structures were listed in the National Register of Historic Places in 2003.

== Description ==
The Rialto Theatre is located in one of the more urban districts of downtown Tucson, across the street from Club Congress. It bears much similarity to the neighboring Hotel Congress, being built in the same year and by the same contractors.

In its capacity as a concert venue since 1995, The Rialto was in need of many repairs, as it still sported a swamp cooler (rather than more modern air conditioning) and a dilapidated interior. Since its latest revitalization in 2004, the theater still boasts some of its original historic interior with a nod to an Art Nouveau motif, along with new and much-needed air conditioners. Substantial improvements in the venue's acoustics was a primary objective of the 2005 renovation.

Primarily holding music concerts from all genres, The Rialto hosts other shows and events as well, from dance, performance, and occasional film screenings. Approximately 150 events occur at the Rialto annually, with reported attendance of more than 100,000 patrons.

== See also ==
- Plitt Theatres
- Rialto Theater
- Plaza Theater (Tucson)
- Fox Tucson Theatre
