= Hotel Congress =

Historic building in Tucson, Arizona

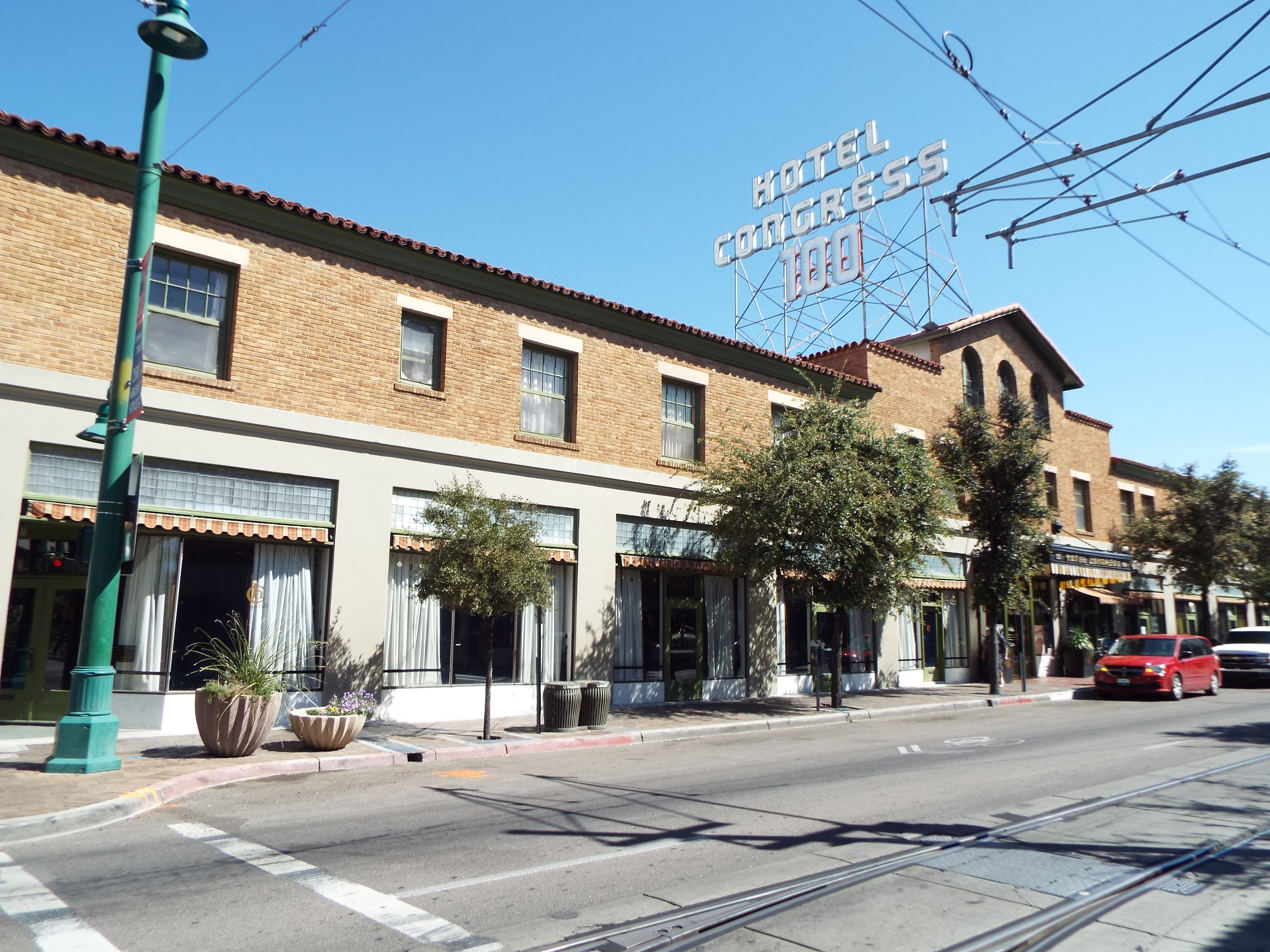
- Historic Hotel Congress

General information
- Location: 311 E Congress St., Tucson, Arizona, United States, 85701
- Coordinates: 32.222245°N 110.966099°W
- Opening: November 18, 1918
- Owner: Richard and Shana Oseran

Website
- hotelcongress.com

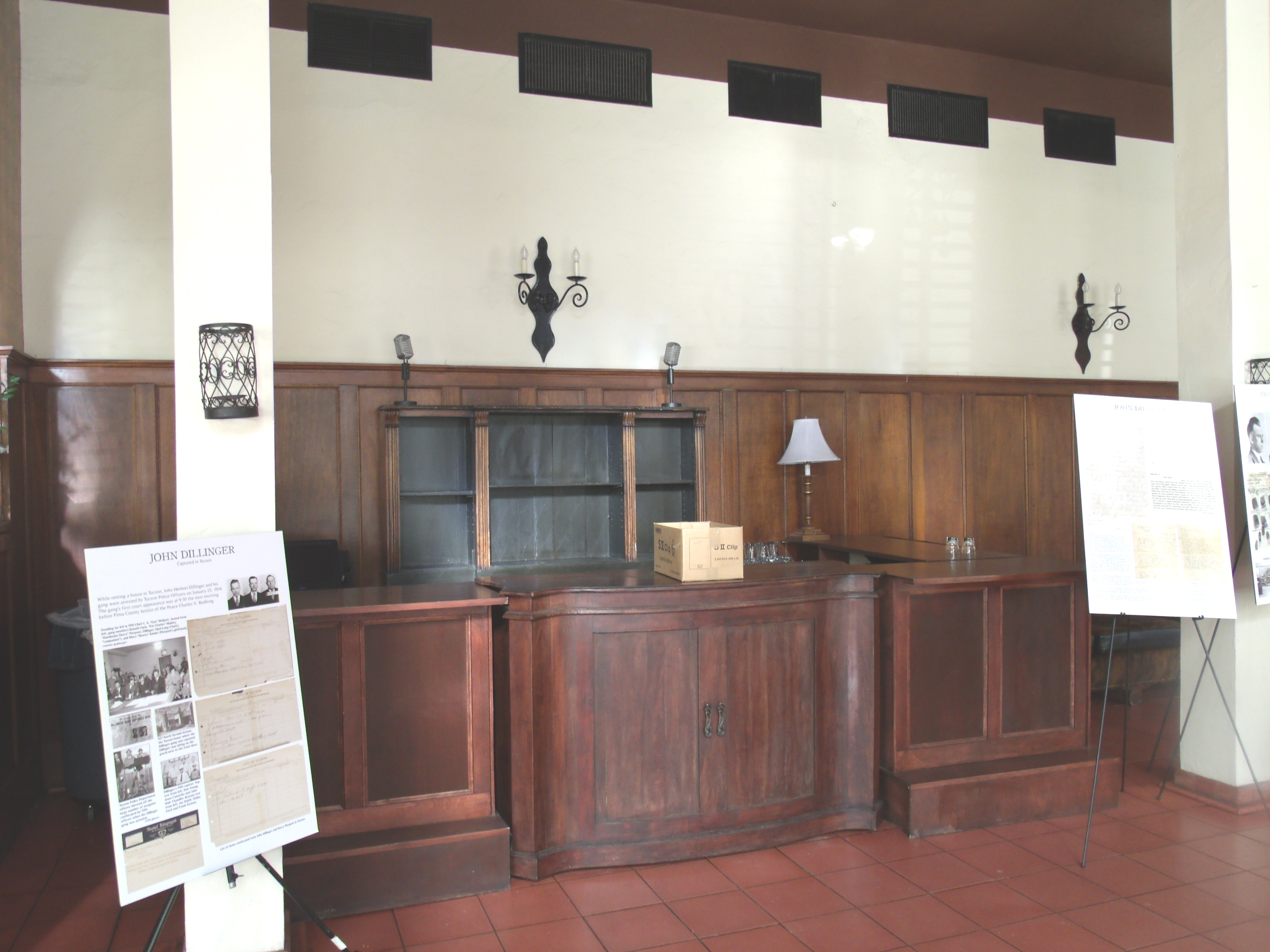
The old lobby of the Hotel Congress which was built in 1919 and associated with John Dillinger

The Hotel Congress is a federally recognized historic building located in downtown Tucson, Arizona. It was built in 1918 and designed by the Los Angeles architectural firm William and Alexander Curlett as part of an expansion of Congress Street and in conjunction with the theatrical venue Rialto Theatre, which sits north of Congress Street. The rear of the building faces the historic Amtrak Southern Pacific train station, built by Southern Pacific in 1907. In addition to being a hotel, the Hotel Congress building also houses a restaurant, bar and music venue. The name "The Congress Hotel" was chosen through a naming competition organized by the Arizona Daily Star newspaper in 1918. The winning suggestion was announced on April 30, 1918, and it was submitted by Dorit Dinkel, who won $15 worth of baby bonds for having their name chosen. The Hotel Congress and its owners since 1985, Richard Oseran and Shana Oseran, have been a key cultural institution and boosters in the early 21st-century redevelopment of Downtown Tucson.

The hotel is known for being the site of the capture of gangster and bank robber John Dillinger's gang in 1934. After a series of bank robberies, the Dillinger Gang arrived in Tucson to hide out. On January 22, 1934, a fire started in the basement and spread up to the third floor, where the gang resided under aliases. After the desk clerk contacted them through the switchboard the gang escaped by aerial ladders. On the request of the gang, two firemen retrieved their luggage, identifying who they were. After being transferred to a jail in Crown Point, Indiana, Dillinger escaped again and was eventually shot down in Chicago, Illinois. Local Tucson architect Roy Place rebuilt the upper floor in the same style as the original. A historic plaque on the south entrance of the hotel bears Place's name so it is often believed to be of his original design.

The Hotel Congress building was added to the National Historic Register in 2003. The Hotel Congress received a Fodor's Choice distinction award in 2006 and again in 2008. According to the National Registration listing, Alexander and William Curlett, Curlett and Son Architects of Los Angeles were the actual designers/architects. A newspaper article from the Arizona Daily Star, dated April 23, 1920, reported:

"A. E. Carlette (Curlett), architect of Los Angeles, was a visitor in Tucson yesterday stopping at the Santa Rita. Mr Carlette (Curlett) was the designer of the new Rialto Theatre and the Congress Hotel."

== Club Congress ==
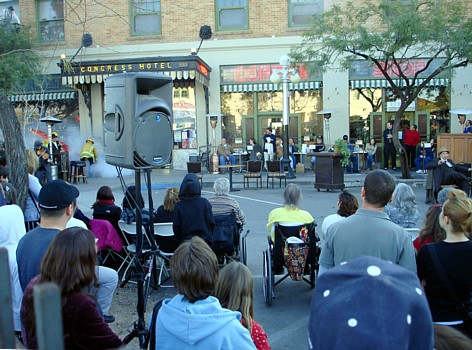
Reenactment of the fire at the Hotel Congress during Dillinger Days, January 2008.

In 1985, a music venue was opened in the hotel, and has become a venue for touring bands playing in Tucson. In February 2005, the stage was completely redesigned by local Latino artist Daniel Martin Diaz, and it was named Best Functional Art Installation by Tucson Weekly in 2006. ZZ Top guitarist Billy Gibbons has said that the Tap Room at Hotel Congress is his favorite bar.

Club Congress is regarded as being the longest-running venue of its kind west of the Mississippi, and, in part because of this distinction, Arizona Governor Janet Napolitano issued a proclamation on July 25, 2005, that Labor Day Weekend would be known as "Club Congress Weekend". In 2004, the hotel's entertainment director David Slutes started a three-day, three-night live music event known as "HOCO Fest".

== The Cup Cafe ==
The Cup Cafe, colloquially known as The Cup, can be found just off the Hotel Congress lobby and offers breakfast, lunch, and dinner.

== The Century Room ==
The Century Room is Tucson's one and only jazz club. It was started in 2022 by Arthur Vint after his experience working the Blue Note Jazz Club and Dizzy's Club in New York. The space that the Century Room occupies formerly was home to the Copper Banquet Hall. The Century Room also plays a big part in the Tucson Jazz Festival where it acts as a main event space alongside the Fox & Rialto Theaters.

The Century Room also hosts a big band on monday nights inspiried by the Village Vanguard Jazz Orchestra. The ensemble features many local jazz music educators and musicians playing the music of Duke Ellington and Count Basie among others. Bassist Ed Friedland has also performed jazz at the Century Room.

== Hotel Interior ==
The hotel has basically maintained the inside decor as it was during the 1930s when the notorious gangster John Dillinger and his gang were arrested in 1934.

Interior of the historic Hotel Congress

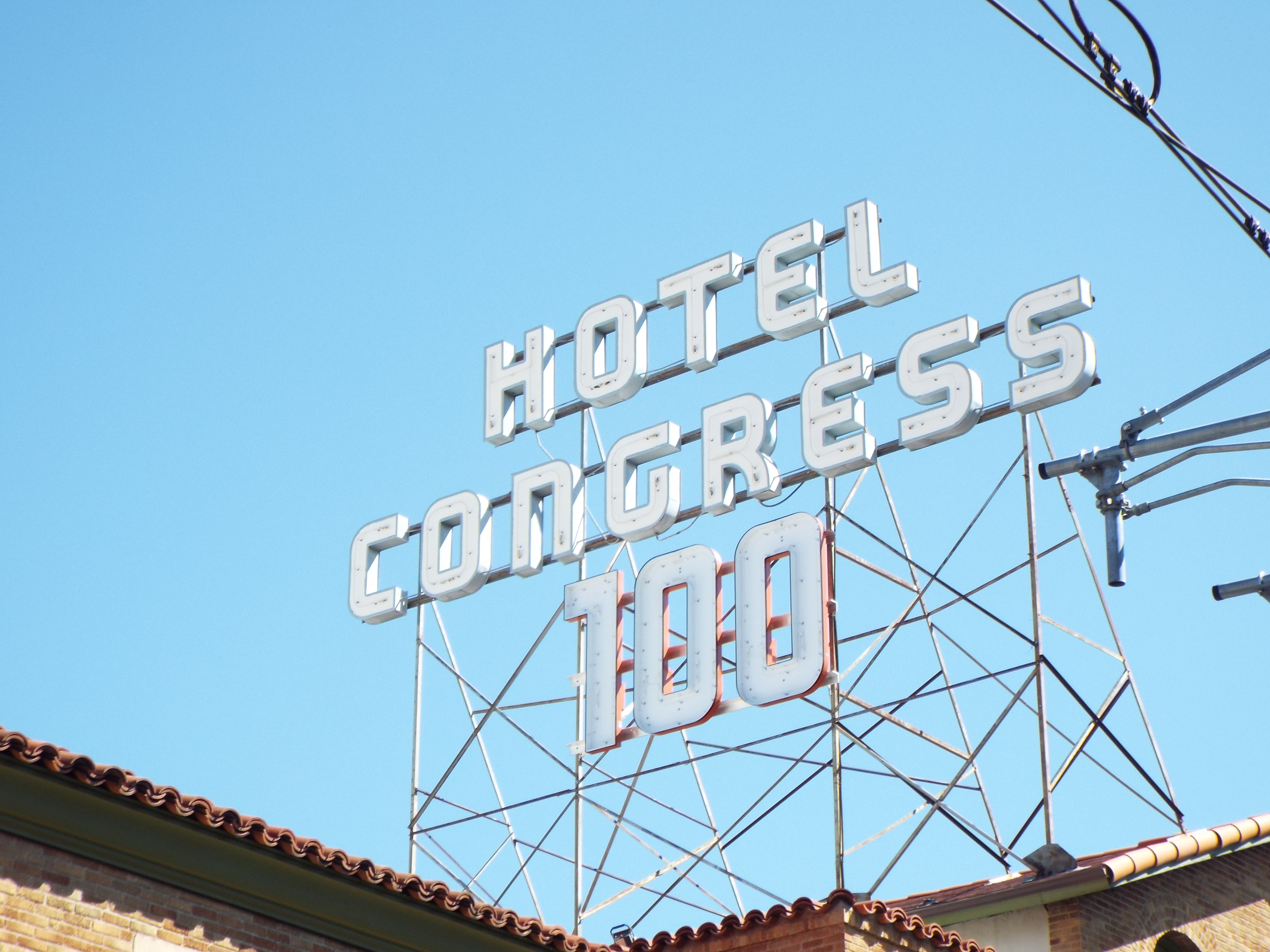
Hotel Congress 100th Anniversary

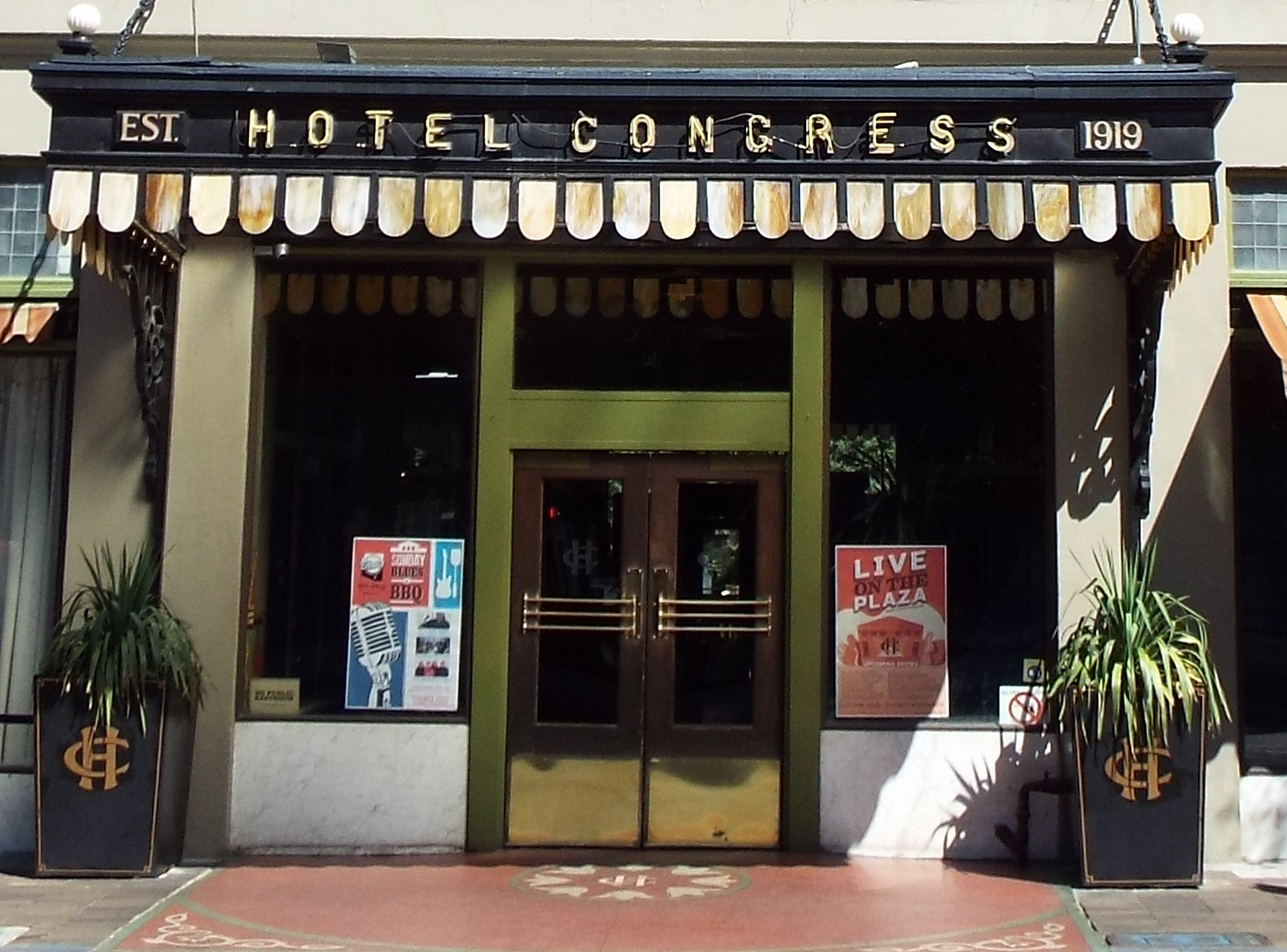
Hotel entrance

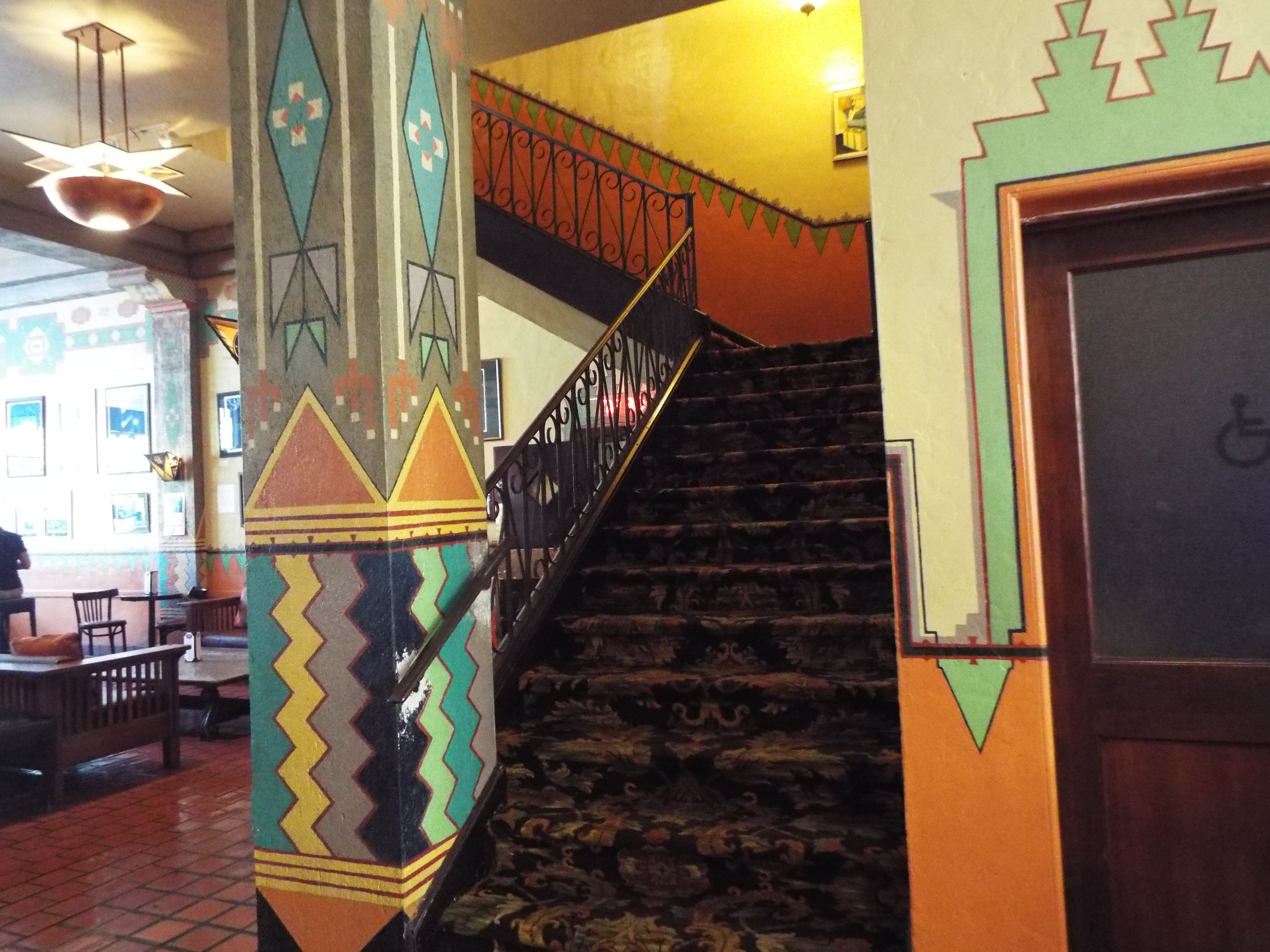
Inside the hotel

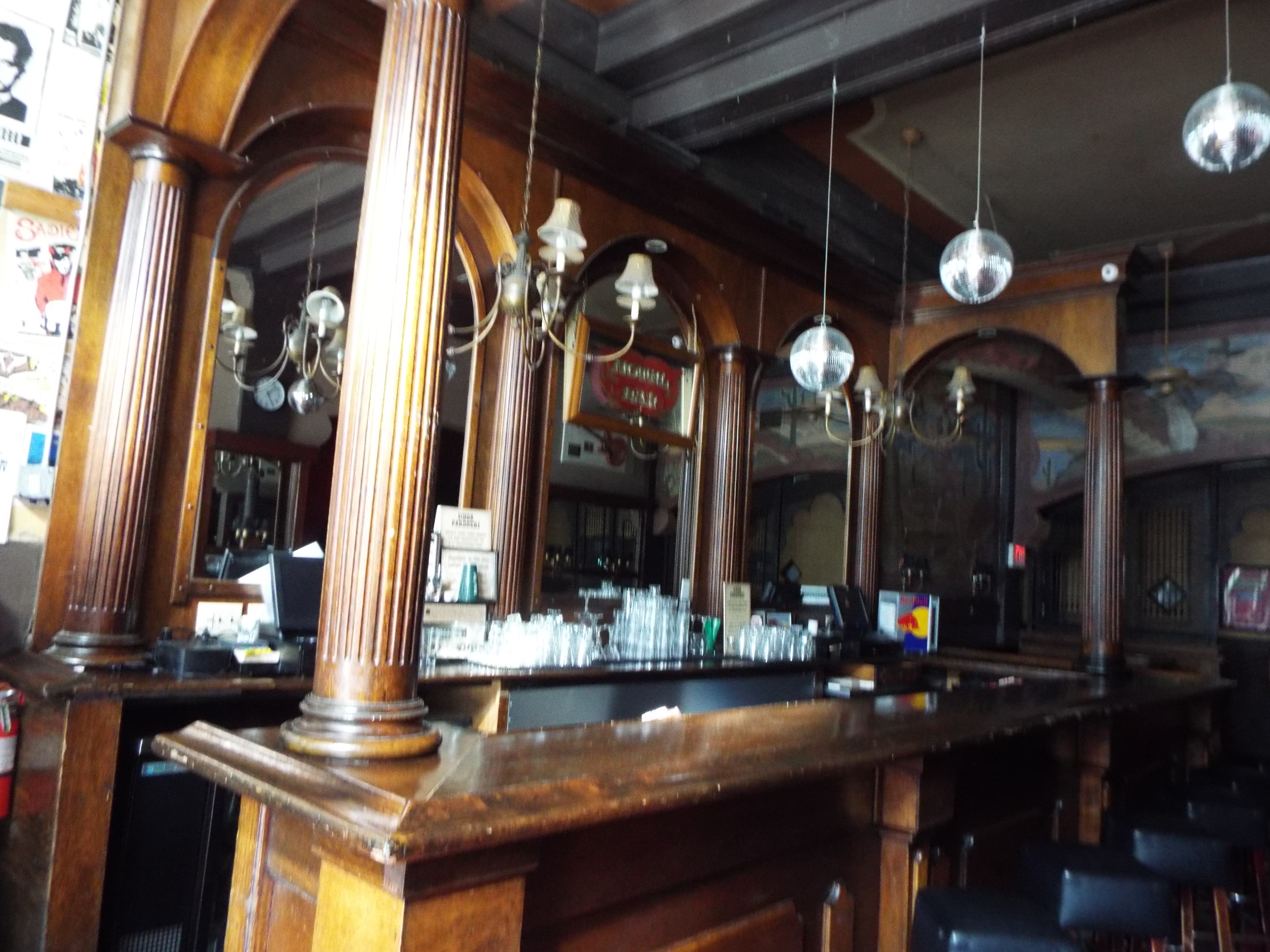
One of the Club Congress hotel bars

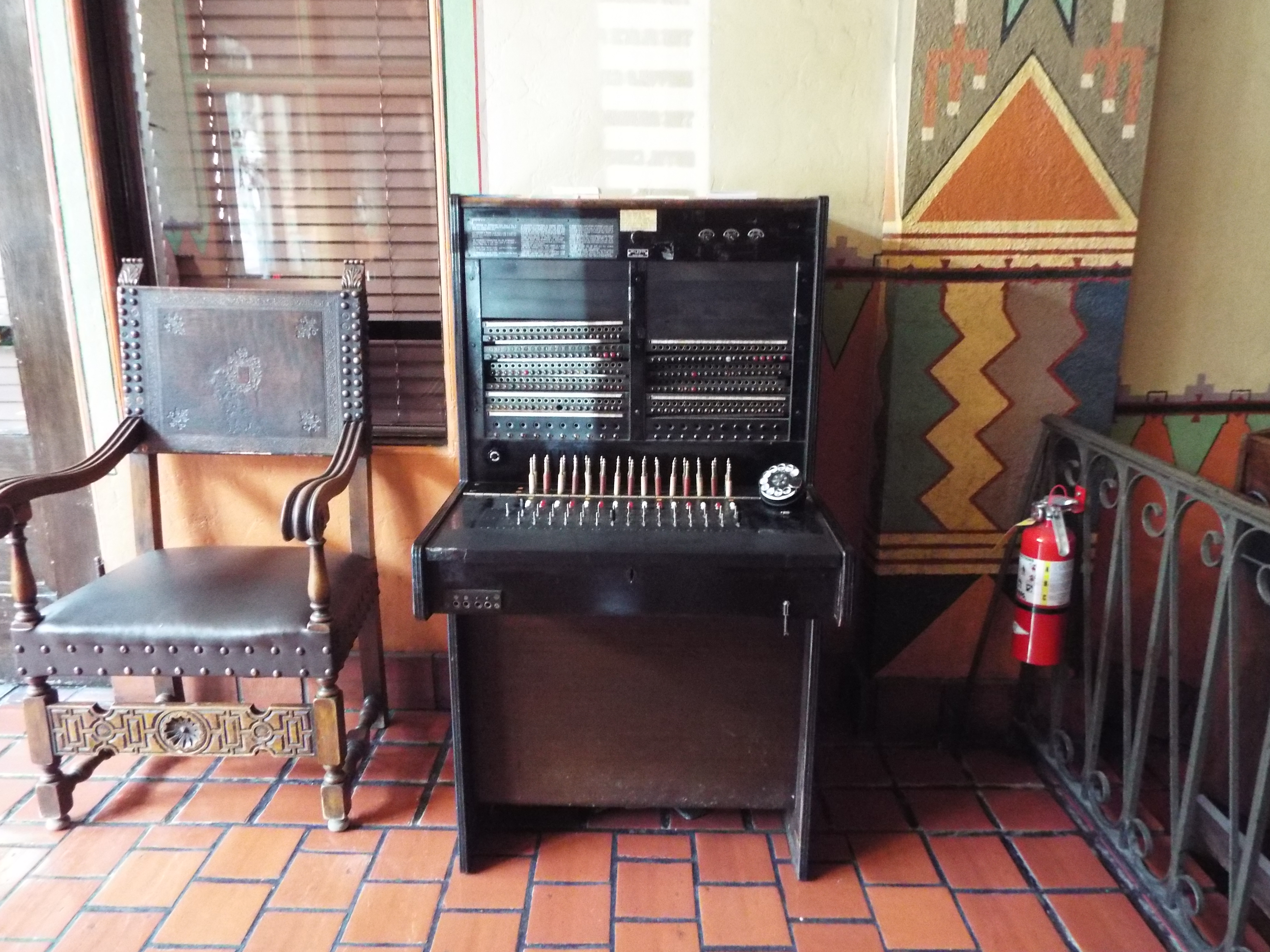
Early hotel switchboard

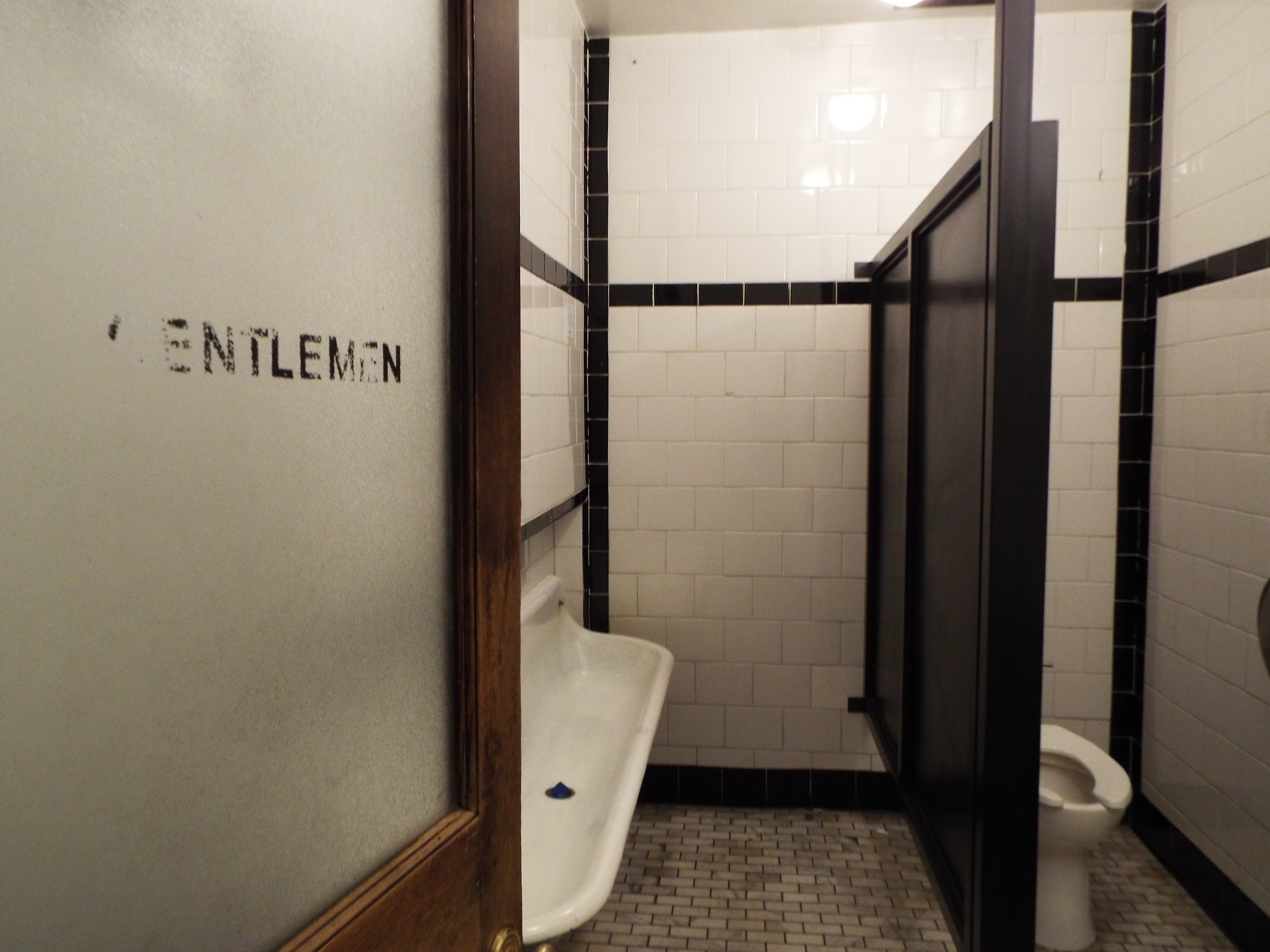
Gentlemen's Restroom

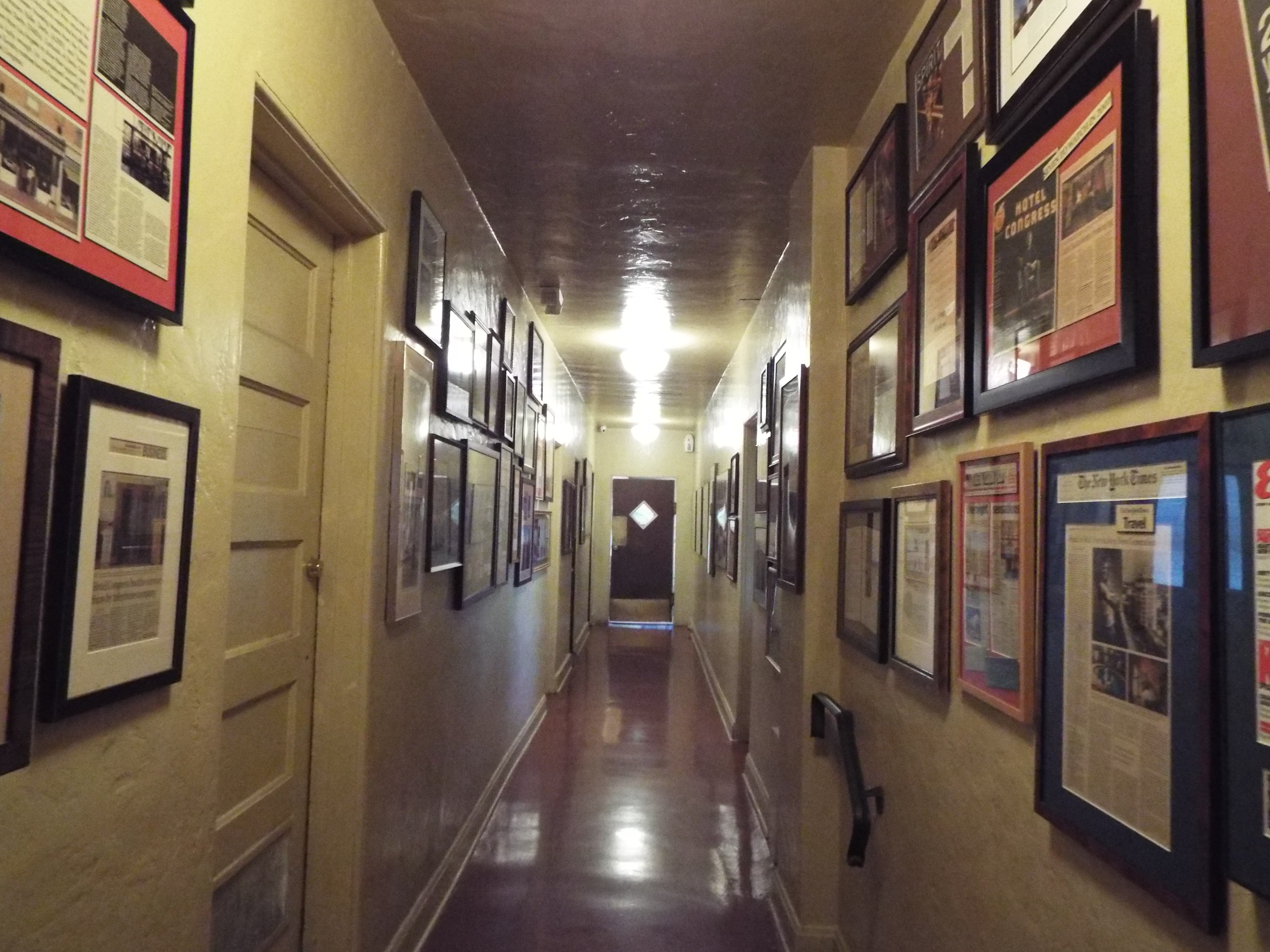
Hotel hallway

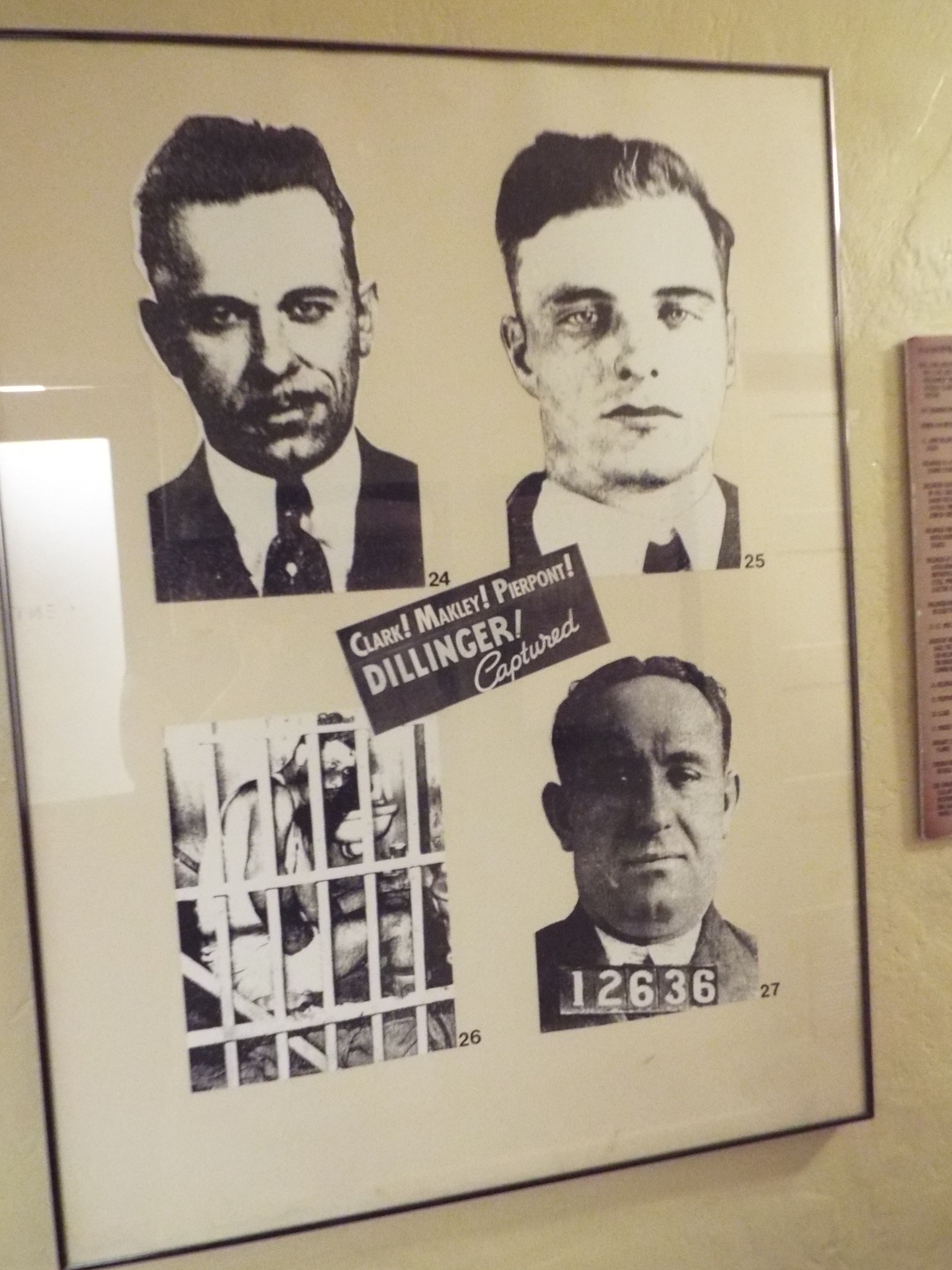
Poster of John Dillinger and two gang members in the hotel hallway

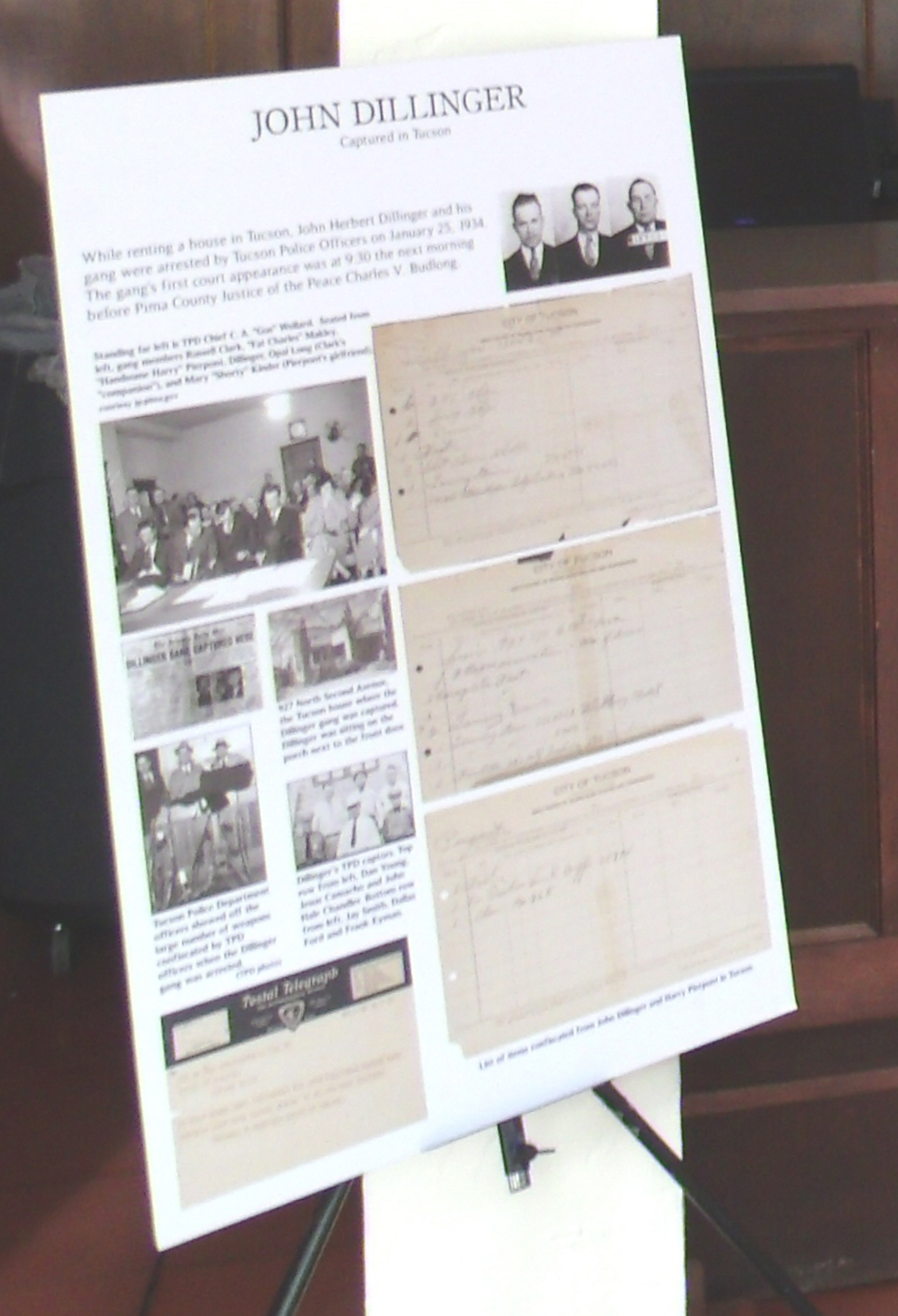
Display of newspaper clippings of the capture of John Dillinger and his gang in the old lobby of the Congress Hotel.
