= Rialto, Liguria =

Rialto
- Comune
- Comune di Rialto
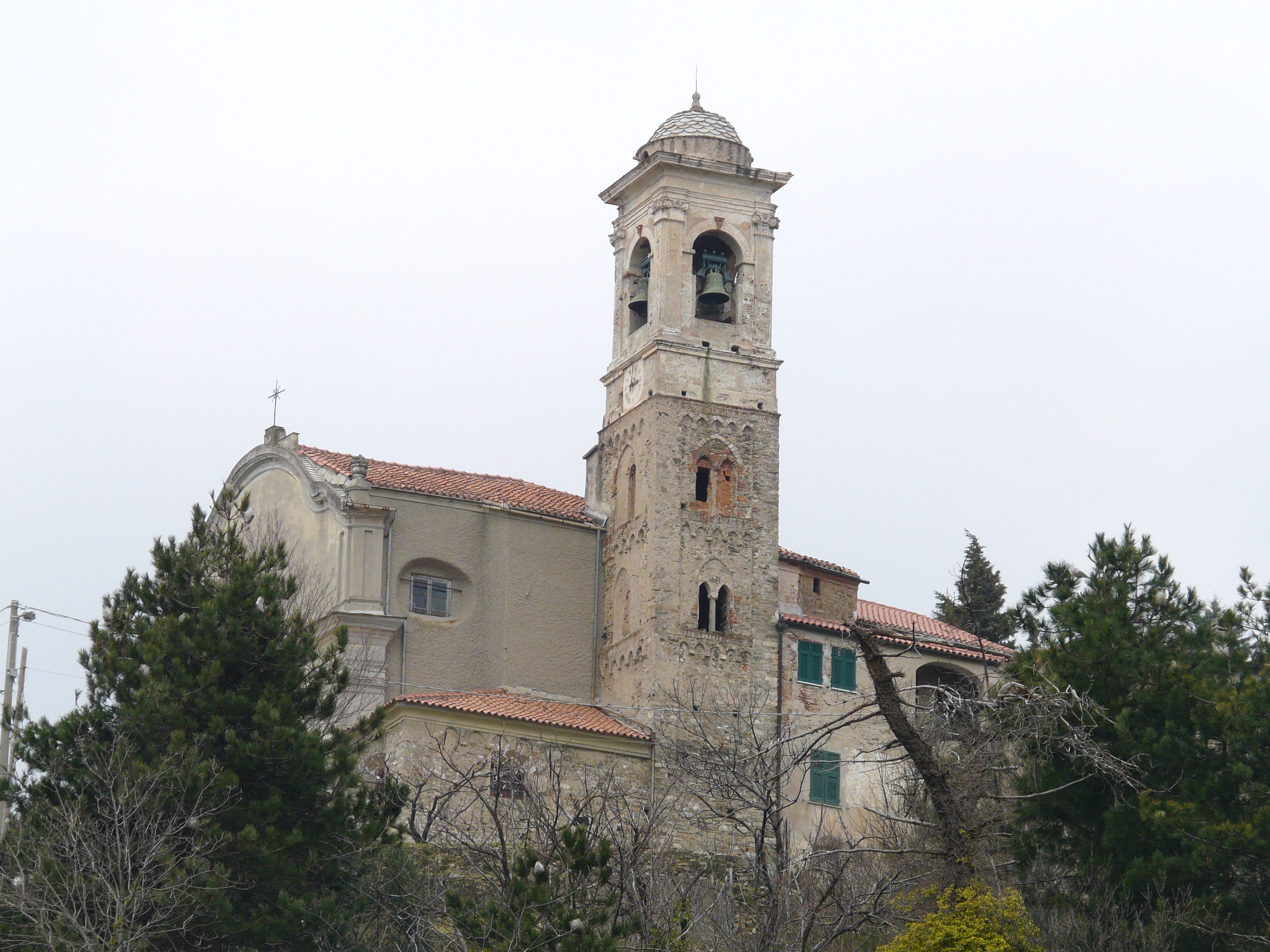
- Saint Peter Church

- Coat of arms

- Location within Italy Location within Liguria
- Coordinates: 44°14′N 8°15′E
- Country: Italy
- Region: Liguria
- Province: Province of Savona (SV)

Area
  - Total: 19.9 km^{2} (7.7 sq mi)

Population (Dec. 2004)
  - Total: 570
  - Density: 29/km^{2} (74/sq mi)
- Time zone: UTC+1 (CET)
  - Summer (DST): UTC+2 (CEST)
- Postal code: 17020
- Dialing code: 019

Rialto (Ligurian: Riätu) is a comune (municipality) in the Province of Savona in the Italian region Liguria, located about 60 kilometres (37 mi) southwest of Genoa and about 20 kilometres (12 mi) southwest of Savona. As of 31 December 2004, it had a population of 570 and an area of 19.9 square kilometres (7.7 mi^{2}).

Rialto borders the following municipalities: Bormida, Calice Ligure, Calizzano, Magliolo, Osiglia, and Tovo San Giacomo.

== Demographic evolution ==
Historical population

Year	Pop.	±%
1861	838	—
1871	975	+16.3%
1881	1,021	+4.7%
1901	1,033	+1.2%
1911	1,004	−2.8%

Year	Pop.	±%
1921	830	−17.3%
1931	707	−14.8%
1936	706	−0.1%
1951	638	−9.6%
1961	566	−11.3%

Year	Pop.	±%
1971	532	−6.0%
1981	539	+1.3%
1991	520	−3.5%
2001	542	+4.2%

Source: Data from ISTAT

== Twin towns and sister cities ==
Rialto is twinned with:

- Cauto Cristo, Cuba

== See also ==
- Bric Gettina
