= Tovo San Giacomo =

- Comune
- Comune di Tovo San Giacomo
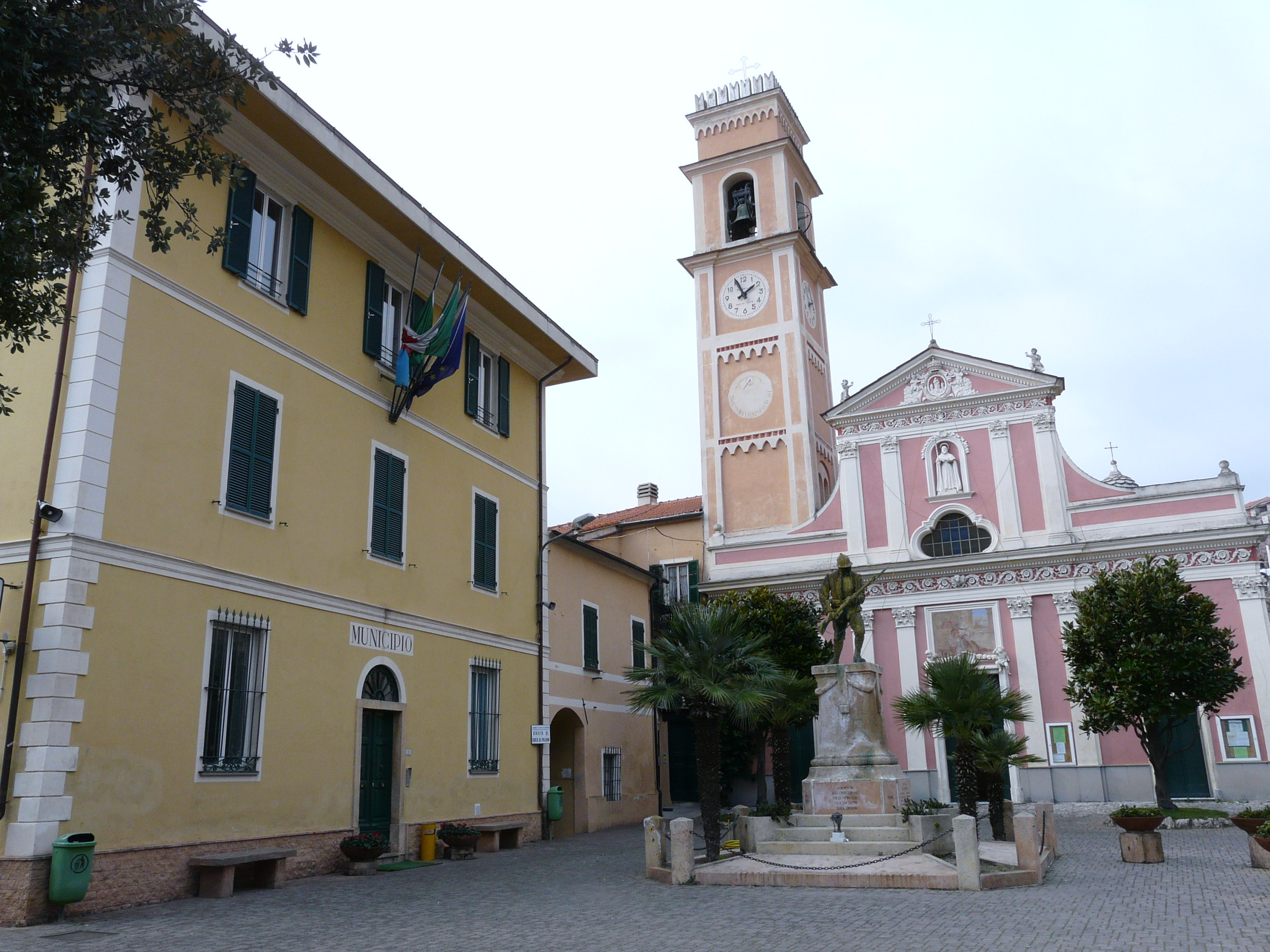
- Town square

- Coat of arms

- Location within Italy Location within Liguria
- Coordinates: 44°10′N 8°16′E
- Country: Italy
- Region: Liguria
- Province: Savona (SV)

Government
  - Mayor: Alessandro Oddo

Area
  - Total: 9.45 km^{2} (3.65 sq mi)
- Elevation: 47 m (154 ft)

Population (31 December 2015)
  - Total: 2,583
  - Density: 273/km^{2} (708/sq mi)
- Demonym: Tovesi
- Time zone: UTC+1 (CET)
  - Summer (DST): UTC+2 (CEST)
- Postal code: 17020
- Dialing code: 019
- Website: Official website

Tovo San Giacomo (Ligurian: U Tu) is a comune (municipality) in the Province of Savona in the Italian region Liguria, located about 60 kilometres (37 mi) southwest of Genoa and about 25 kilometres (16 mi) southwest of Savona.

Tovo San Giacomo borders the following municipalities: Borgio Verezzi, Calice Ligure, Finale Ligure, Giustenice, Magliolo, Pietra Ligure, and Rialto.
