= Bormida, Liguria =

Bormida
- Comune
- Comune di Bormida
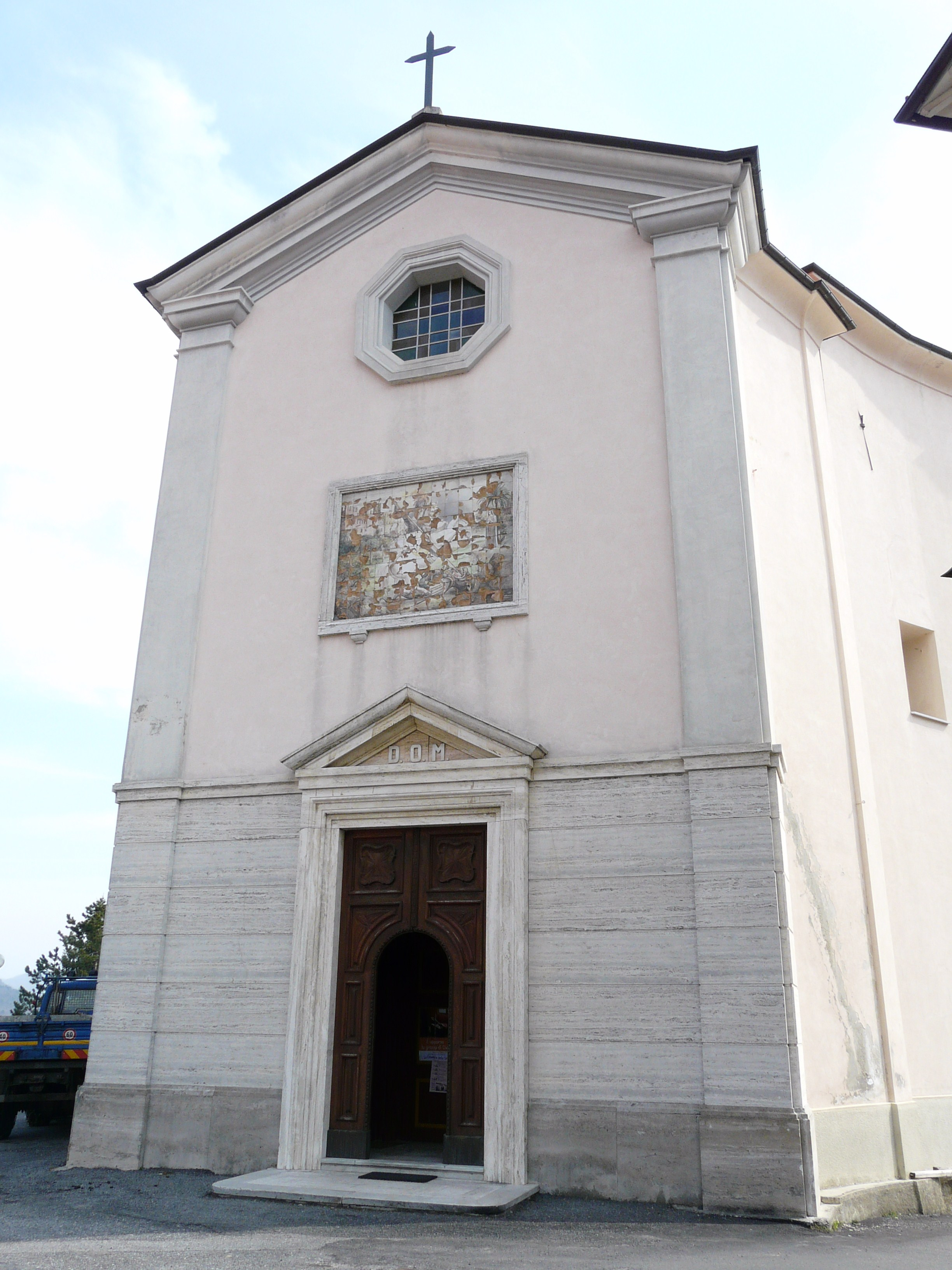
- Church of Saint George

- Location within Italy Location within Liguria
- Coordinates: 44°17′N 8°14′E
- Country: Italy
- Region: Liguria
- Province: Savona (SV)
- Frazioni: Chiesa, Fornelli, Piano Soprano, Piano Sottano, Resi, Costa, Pirotti, Navoni-Balteria, Romano

Government
  - Mayor: Bruna Cambise In Falciani (elected June 13, 2004)

Area
  - Total: 22.43 km^{2} (8.66 sq mi)
- Elevation: 485 m (1,591 ft)

Population (31 December 2006)
  - Total: 453
  - Density: 20.2/km^{2} (52.3/sq mi)
- Demonym: Bormidesi
- Time zone: UTC+1 (CET)
  - Summer (DST): UTC+2 (CEST)
- Postal code: 17040
- Dialing code: 019
- Patron saint: Saint George
- Saint day: 23 April

Bormida (Ligurian: Bormia or Burmia; Piedmontese: Bormia), with a population of 453 spread over an area of 22.4 square kilometres (8.6 mi^{2}), is a rural municipality of the Province of Savona in the Italian region Liguria. The municipality is a member of the Comunità Montana Alta Val Bormida. On May 11, 2017 it was reported that due to a declining population the town's mayor Daniele Galliano recommended a proposal to the Ligurian regional government, and not a confirmed measure, but that it hopes to enact the bonus in 2018 of offering €2,000 ($2,175) and very low rents starting at $50 per month for anyone willing to move there.

== Location ==
Location of the municipality within the Province of Savona

Bormida is about 20 kilometres (12 mi) west of Savona (as the crow flies) in the upper Val Bormida between the mountain peaks of Settepani, elevation 1,386 metres (4,547 ft), and Ronco di Maglio, elevation 1,108 metres (3,635 ft). The Bormida di Pallare, a tributary of the Bormida di Spigno, flows through its territory.

Bormida borders the villages of Calice Ligure, Calizzano, Mallare, Osiglia, Pallare, and Rialto.

== History ==
Bormida probably came into existence in the medieval period. However it does not appear in the documentary record until 1549 when Alfonso Del Carretto, lord of Finale Ligure, conceded certain privileges to the local population in a notarized deed.

In 1713, following a period of domination by the Spanish army, Bormida fell under the jurisdiction of the Republic of Genoa. Later in that century it acquired the status of a municipality in its own right, rather than being a part of the municipality of Osiglia, and was almost completely destroyed by the French army of Napoleon Bonaparte during his first Italian campaign.

From 1815 it followed the fortunes of the Kingdom of Sardinia, becoming part of the Kingdom of Italy in 1860.

== Architecture ==
The parish church of San Giorgio, dating back to the year 1200, contains praiseworthy frescos and a wooden Madonna attributed to the sculptor Anton Maria Maragliano. The fifteenth-century campanile was remodelled in the Baroque style.

The palazzo "la Ferriera" ("the Iron-works") is surrounded by a large and interesting park. Its name recalls the fact that iron working was the main economic activity of the area in centuries past.

== Festivals ==
The feast of the Madonna del Carmine is celebrated on 16 July in the locality Piano Sottano, where a small church is dedicated to her.

== Economy ==
The principal bases of the local economy are timber and agriculture. Cereals are grown, livestock is raised and cheese is produced.

== Roads and railways ==
Bormida is situated on the Strada Provinciale 339 di Cengio which connects Cengio to Cortemilia. There is no direct link to any autostrada, but from the Autostrada A6 Verdemare, which links Turin to Savona, the Altare exit is the most convenient.

The nearest railway station is at Altare on the Turin–Savona line.

== Demographic evolution ==
Historical population

Year	Pop.	±%
1861	1,029	—
1871	971	−5.6%
1881	978	+0.7%
1901	1,009	+3.2%
1911	942	−6.6%

Year	Pop.	±%
1921	912	−3.2%
1931	878	−3.7%
1936	841	−4.2%
1951	803	−4.5%
1961	718	−10.6%

Year	Pop.	±%
1971	637	−11.3%
1981	577	−9.4%
1991	505	−12.5%
2001	453	−10.3%

Source: Data from ISTAT

In May 2017, the mayor of Bormida, Daniele Galliano, announced a scheme to attract more residents to the village. New inhabitants would be offered €2,000 to take up residence, as well as subsidised rent for between €50 - €120 per month. After a flood of inquiries, the mayor clarified that the offer was a proposal to the Ligurian regional government.
