= Alta Via dei Monti Liguri =

Hiking trail in Liguria, Italy

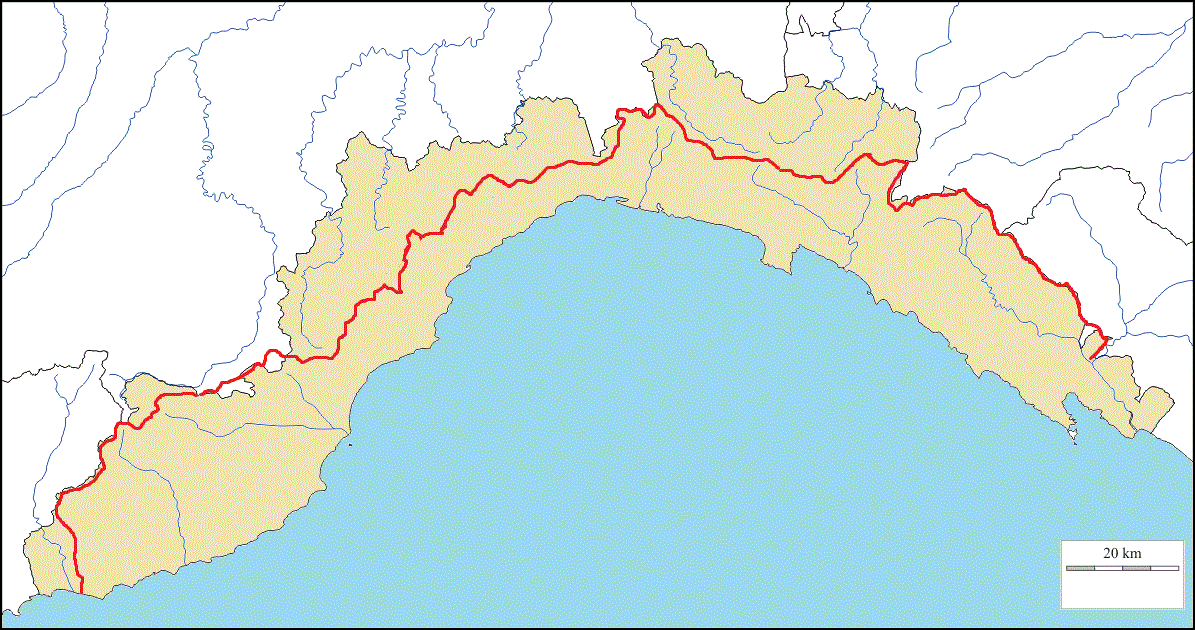
- AV map
- Length: 440 km
- Location: Liguria (Italy)
- Established: 1983
- Use: Hiking
- Highest point: 2201
- Lowest point: 0
- Website: http://www.altaviadeimontiliguri.it/

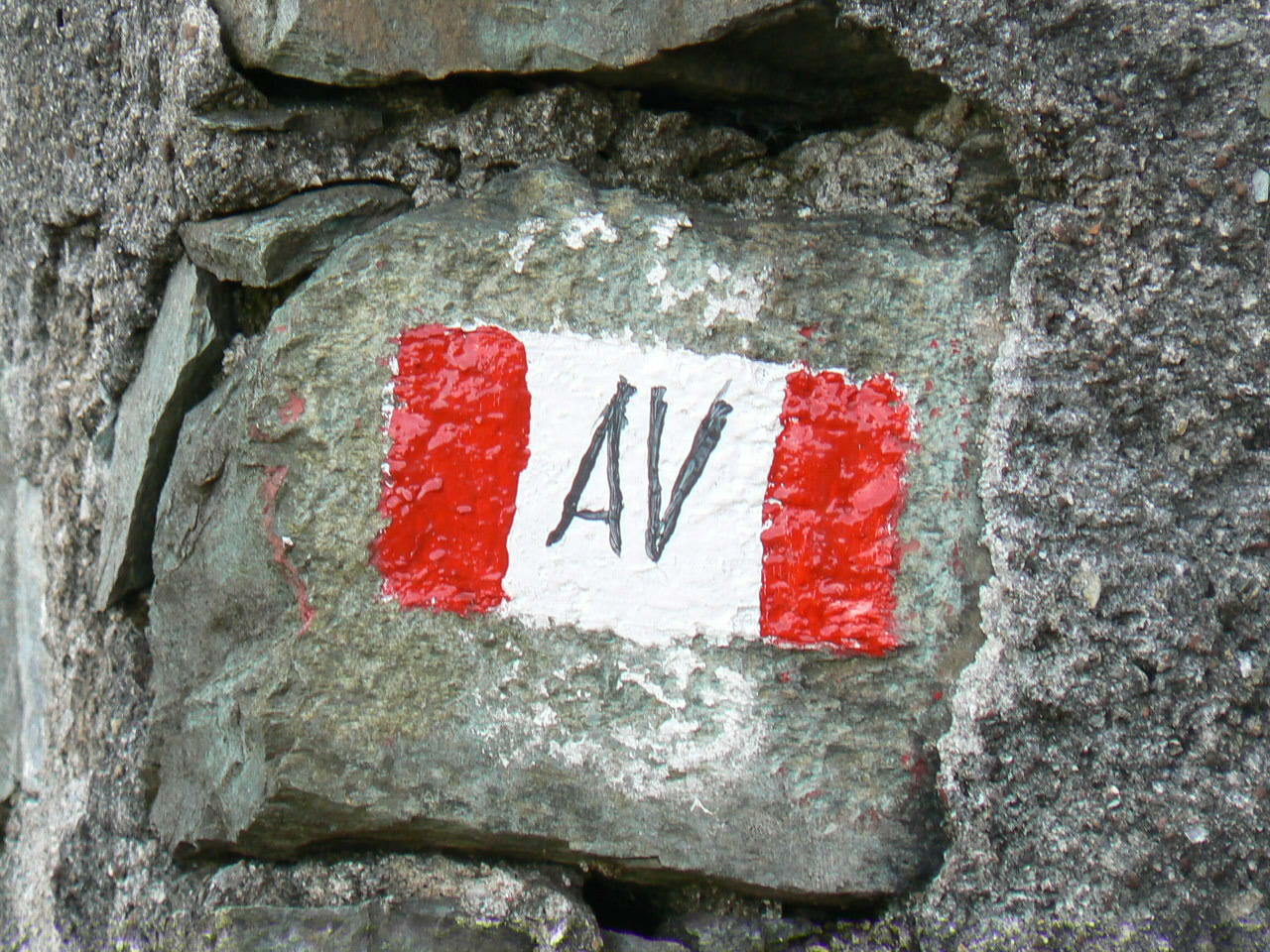
AV trail marker

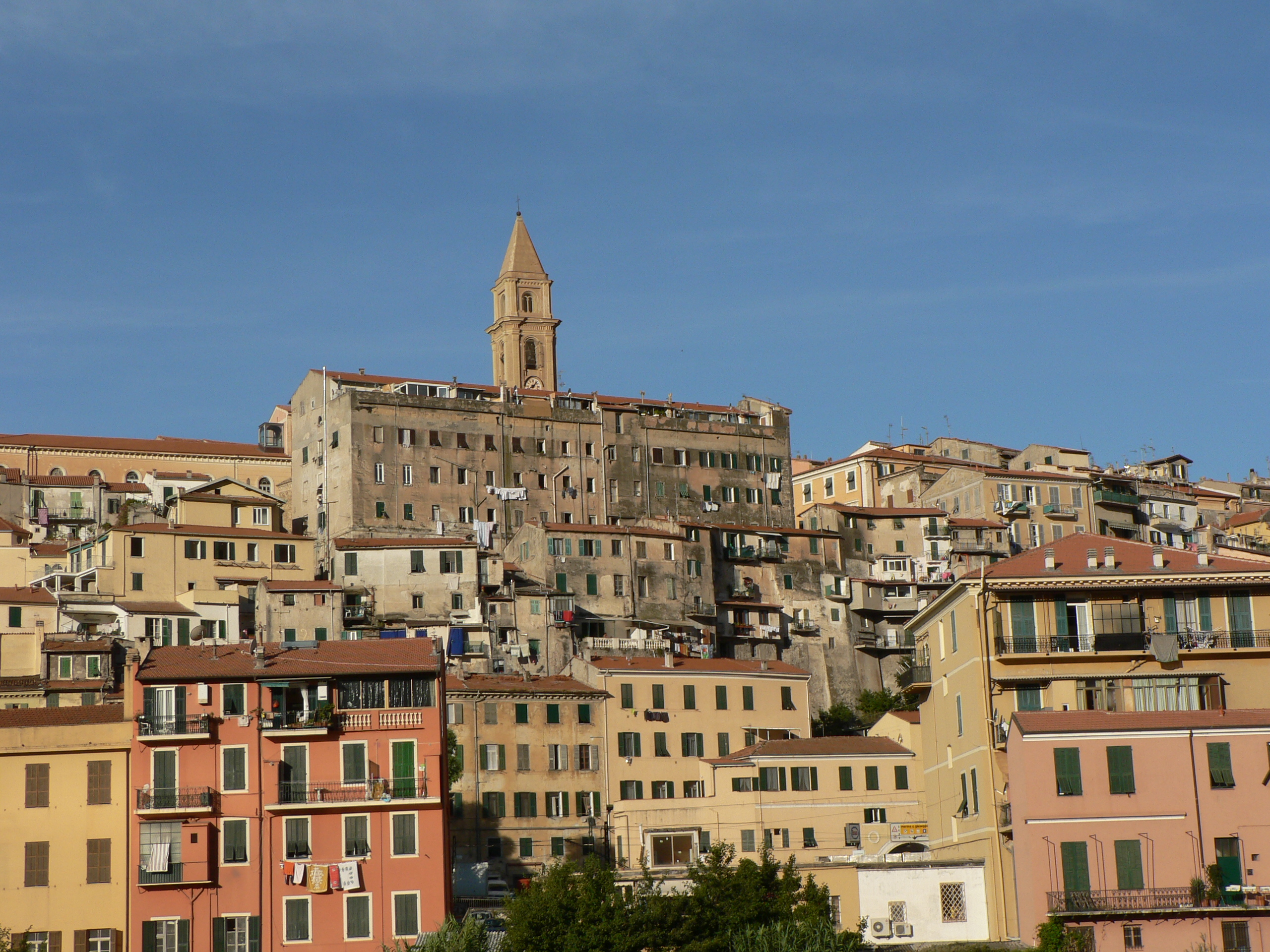
Panorama of Ventimiglia

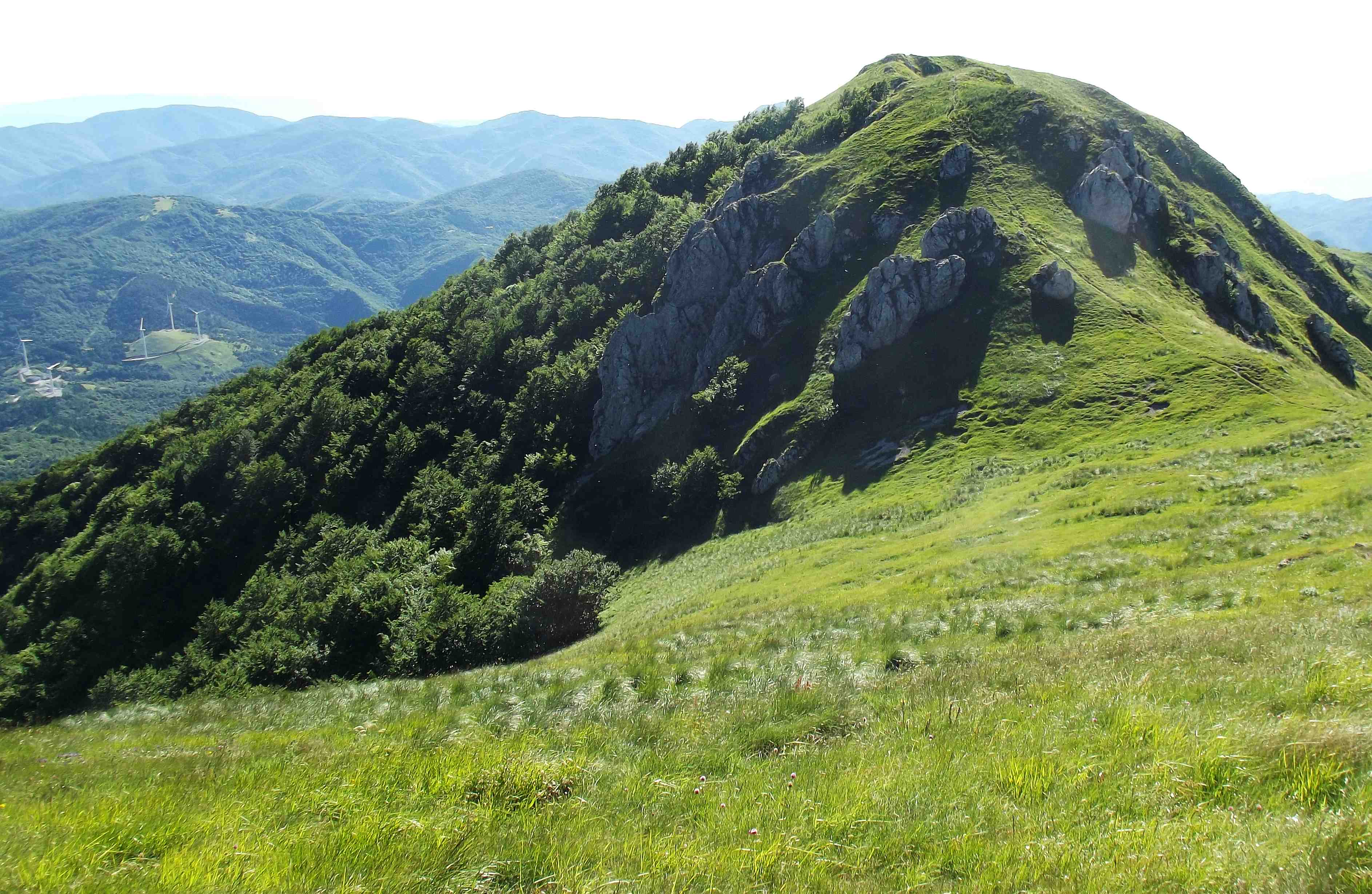
Monte Galero

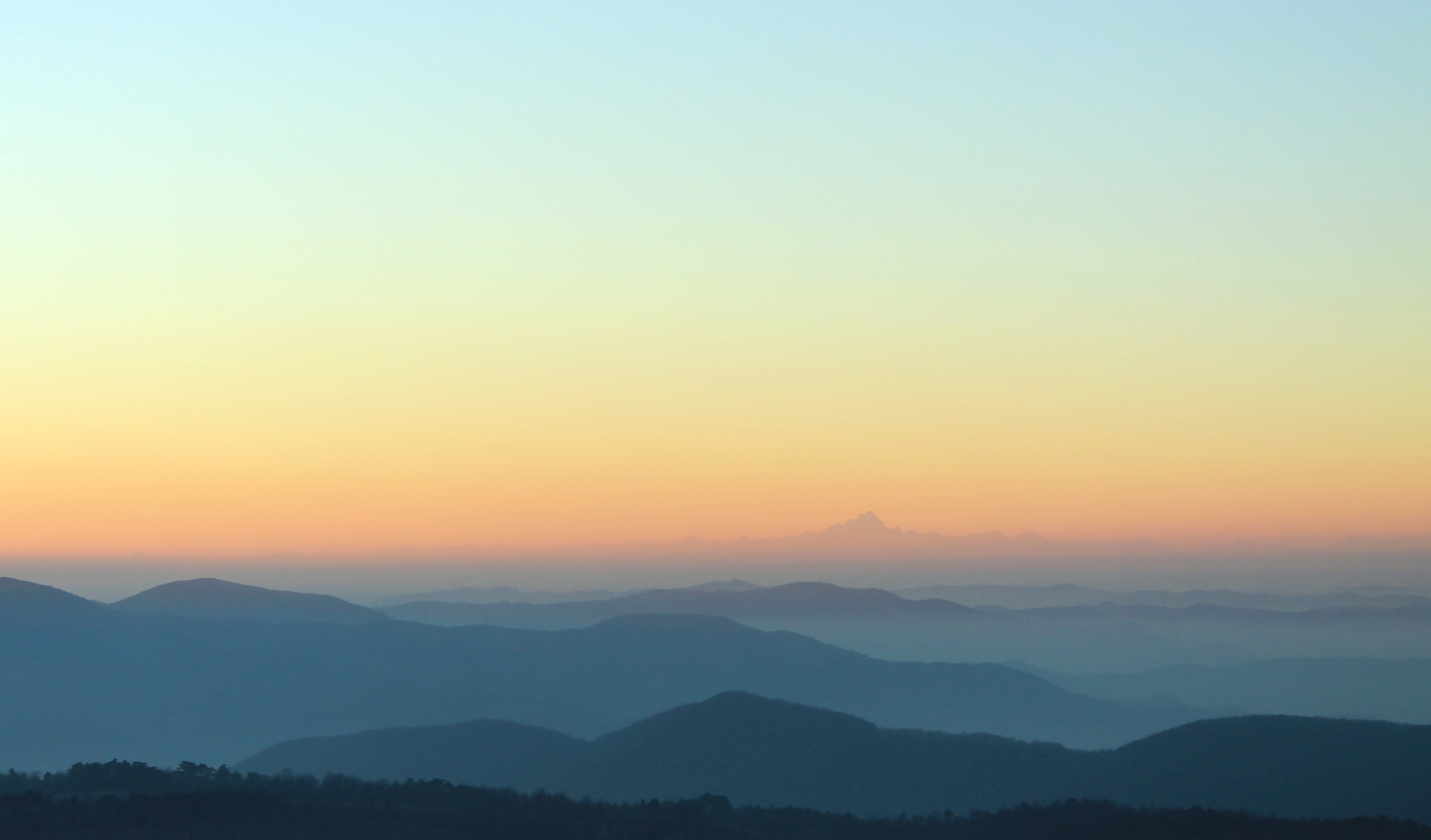
Sunset from Piani di Praglia

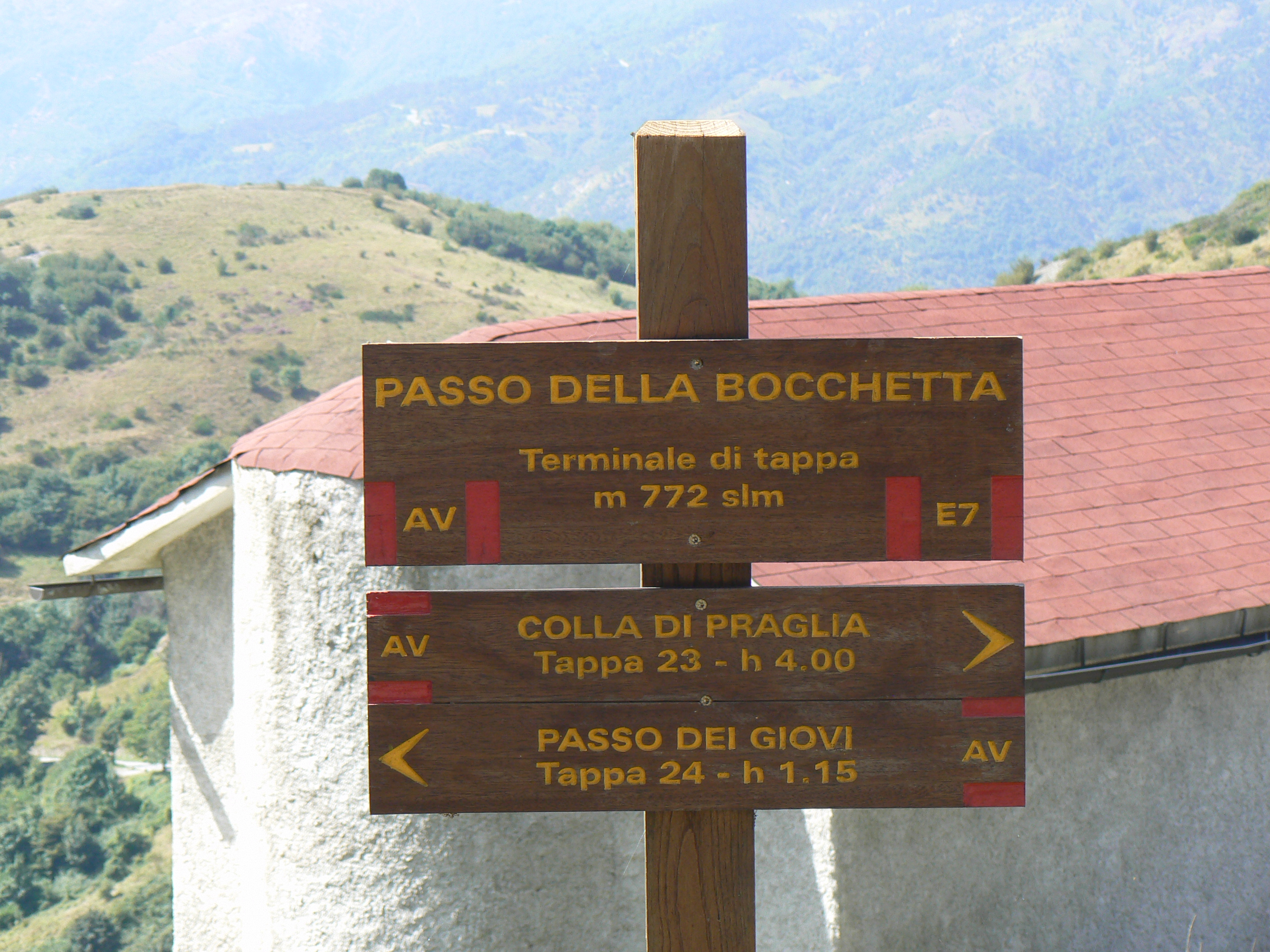
Section 23: passo della Bocchetta.

The Alta Via dei Monti Liguri (AV, literally "High Route of the Ligurian Mountains") is a long-distance waymarked hiking trail in the Italian region of Liguria. In about 440 kilometres (270 mi) and 44 day hikes, it runs through the arc formed by Ligurian Alps and Ligurian Apennines from Ventimiglia (IM, in the westernmost part of the region) to Ceparana (Bolano, SP, on its east side).

== History ==
The Alta Via has officially born in 1983 from a joint project of Centro Studi Unioncamere Liguri, Club Alpino Italiano and Federazione Italiana Escursionismo. The trekking path is upheld by the legge regionale (regional law) nr. 5 of 25 January 1993 - Individuazione dell' itinerario escursionistico denominato "Alta Via dei Monti Liguri" e disciplina delle relative attrezzature.

== Route ==
n.	section	distance (km)	maximum height (m)
1	Ventimiglia (IM) - La Colla	10	510 - Monte Baraccone
2	La Colla - Colla Sgora	9	1063 - Colla Sgora
3	Colla Sgora - Colla Scarassan	12.2	1587 - Testa d'Alpe
4	Colla Scarassan - Sella d'Agnaira	13	1909 - Passo della Valletta
5	Sella d'Agnaira - Sella della Valletta	15	2201 - Monte Saccarello (IM-CN-F)
6	Sella della Valletta - Colle San Bernardo di Mendatica (IM)	10	2085 - Monte Cimonasso
7	Colle San Bernardo di Mendatica - Colle di Nava (IM)	10.5	1356 - Poggio dei Preti
8	Colle di Nava - Passo di Pralè	6	1258 - Passo di Pralè
9	Passo di Pralè - Colle San Bartolomeo d'Ormea (CN)	8.8	1739 - Monte Armetta
10	Colle San Bartolomeo d'Ormea - Colle San Bernardo di Garessio (CN)	13.5	1708 - Monte Galero
11	Colle San Bernardo di Garessio - Colle Scravaion	9.4	1084 - Bric Schenasso
12	Colle Scravaion - Giogo di Toirano (SV)	5.7	971 - Sella Nord Monte Sebanco
13	Giogo di Toirano - Giogo di Giustenice (SV)	7	1389 - Monte Carmo
14	Giogo di Giustenice - Colle del Melogno	9	1335 - Bric Agnellino
15	Colle del Melogno - Colle San Giacomo	15	1028 - Colle del Melogno
16	Colle San Giacomo - Colle di Cadibona (SV)	13	821 - Monte Baraccone
17	Colle di Cadibona - Le Meugge	11.4	720 - Le Meugge
18	Le Meugge - Colle del Giovo (SV)	11.7	883 - Bric Sportiole
19	Colle del Giovo - Prà Riondo	13	1287 - Monte Beigua
20	Pra Riondo - Passo del Faiallo (SV)	8.8	1145 - Cima Frattin
21	Passo del Faiallo - Passo del Turchino (GE)	8.8	1061 - Passo del Faiallo
22	Passo del Turchino - Colla di Praglia (GE)	11.5	960 - Colle Sud Monte Foscallo
23	Colla di Praglia - Passo della Bocchetta (AL-GE)	13	1065 - Sella Nord Monte Taccone
24	Passo della Bocchetta - Passo dei Giovi (GE)	6	785 - Pian di Reste
25	Passo dei Giovi - Crocetta d'Orero (GE)	7.4	680 - Sella Sud Monte Vittoria
26	Crocetta d'Orero - Colle di Creto (GE)	7.8	795 - Sella Sud Monte Carossino
27	Colle di Creto - Passo dello Scoffera (GE)	14	978 - Passo del Fuoco
28	Passo della Scoffera - Sella della Giassina	8.2	1080 - Valico Monte Lavagnola
29	Sella della Giassina - Barbagelata (GE)	6.5	1120 - Barbagelata
30	Barbagelata - Passo di Ventarola	9.2	1120 - Barbagelata
31	Passo di Ventarola - Passo della Forcella (GE)	9.7	1345 - Monte Ramaceto
32	Passo della Forcella - Passo delle Lame	7.2	1300 - Passo delle Lame
33	Passo delle Lame - Passo della Spingarda	7.6	1701 - Monte Aiona
34	Passo della Spingarda - Passo del Bocco (GE-PR)	13.8	1623 - Sella del Monte Nero
35	Passo del Bocco - Colla Craiolo	9	1404 - Monte Zatta
36	Colla Craiolo - Passo di Centocroci (SP-PR)	16	1177 - Monte Ventarola
37	Passo di Centocroci - Passo della Cappelletta	5	1102 - Passo Scassella
38	Passo della Cappelletta - Passo dei Due Santi	17	1640 - Monte Gottero
39	Passo dei Due Santi - Passo Calzavitello	11.6	1583 - Monte Tecchione
40	Passo Calzavitello - Passo del Rastello	5.6	1161 - Monte Antessio
41	Passo del Rastello - Passo dei Casoni	10.2	1093 - Monte Fiorito
42	Passo dei Casoni - Passo Alpicella	8.6	1062 - La Conchetta
43	Passo Alpicella - Valico del Solini	5.4	720 - Monte Belvedere
44	Valico del Solini - Ceparana (SP)	11.3	575 - Valico del Solini

The Alta Via crosses several nature reserves: Parco naturale regionale del Beigua, Parco naturale regionale delle Alpi Liguri, Parco naturale delle Capanne di Marcarolo and Parco naturale regionale dell'Aveto. Its highest point is monte Saccarello (2201 m).

== Similar Treks ==
- Alta Via 1
- Alta Via 2
- Grand Italian Trail
- Selvaggio Blu (Sardinia)
- Strada delle 52 Gallerie
- Caminito del Rey
- Tofana di Rozes

== See also ==
- Monte Baraccone
