= Taccone =

Taccone is an Italian surname. Notable people with the surname include:

- Asa Taccone (born 1983), American musician
- Innocenzio Taccone (17th century), Italian baroque painter
- Jorma Taccone (born 1977), American actor, comedian, musician, and writer
- Luciano Taccone (born 1989), Argentine Olympic triathlete
- Tony Taccone (born 1951), American theatre director
- Vito Taccone (1940–2007), Italian cyclist
- Fredric Taccone (born 1955) American Electronics Manufacturer

== See also ==
- Monte Taccone, Italian mountain
