= Passo del Faiallo =

Mountain pass in Italy

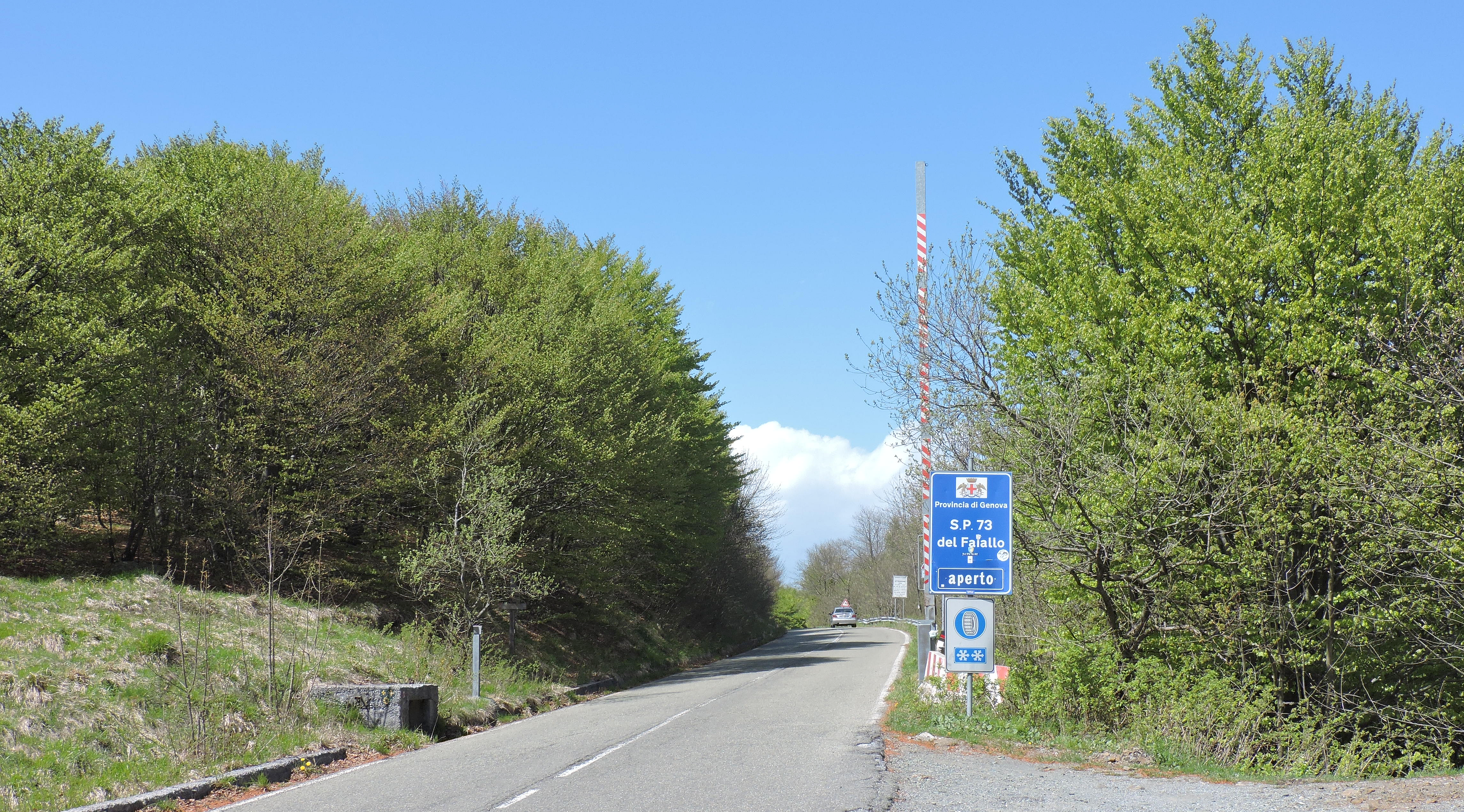

- Location within Italy
- Elevation: 1,044 metres (3,425 ft)
- Traversed by: Provincial roads nr. 73 and nr. 40

Third Approach
- Location: Liguria, Italy
- Range: Ligurian Apennine
- Coordinates: 44°27′44″N 8°40′04″E

Passo del Faiallo (1044 m) is a mountain pass between the Province of Savona (SV) and the Metropolitan City of Genoa (GE). It connects Urbe (SV) with Passo del Turchino (GE), both in Liguria.

== Etymology ==
The name Faiallo indirectly comes from Latin fagus (beech in English) through the equivalent Ligurian and Piedmontese terms. The woodland surrounding the pass is still mainly composed by beech trees.

== Geography ==
Passo del Faiallo is located in the Ligurian Apennine, on the water divide between the basins of Ligurian Sea (south of the pass) and Po. It can be reached from San Pietro d'Urbe (SV) by the provincial road nr. 40 and from Passo del Turchino (GE) by the provincial road n.73, both asphalted. On its northern side at 1055 metres stands a hotel.

== Hiking ==
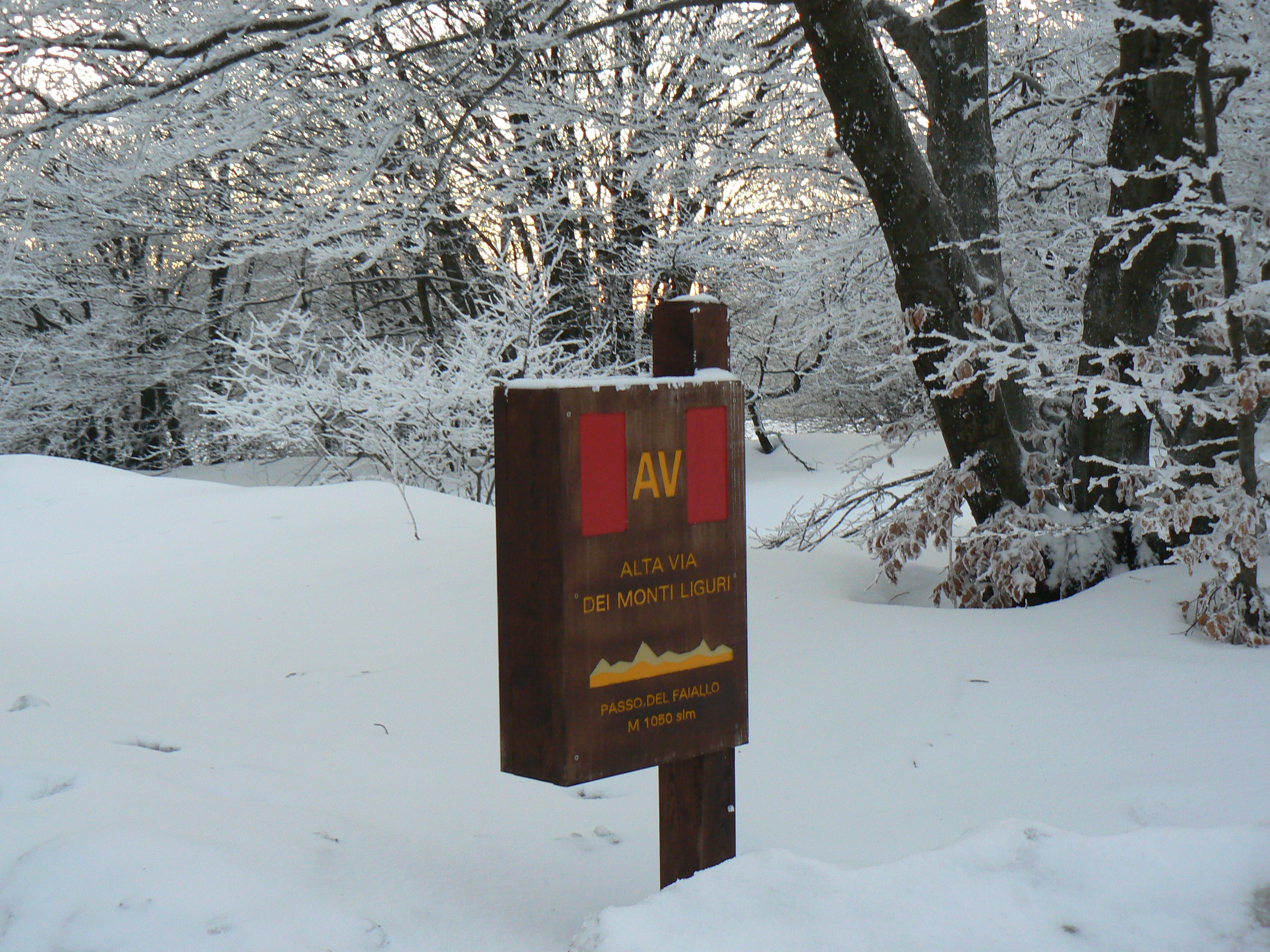
Alta Via dei Monti Liguri sign at the pass

The pass is also accessible by off-road mountain paths and is crossed by the Alta Via dei Monti Liguri, a long-distance trail from Ventimiglia (province of Imperia) to Bolano (province of La Spezia).

== See also ==
- List of mountain passes
