= Monte Taccone =

Mountain in Italy

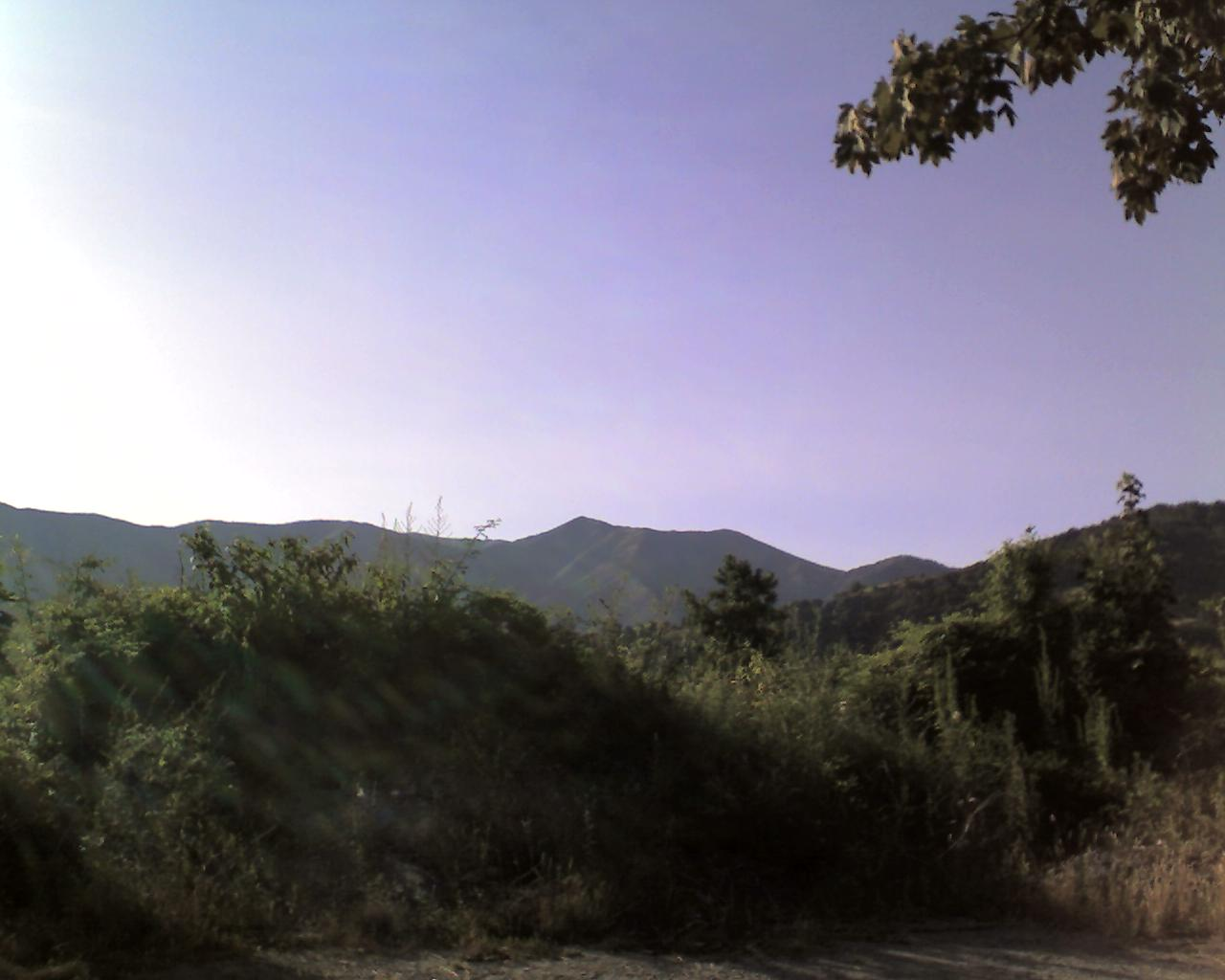

Highest point
- Elevation: 1,113 m (3,652 ft)
- Coordinates: 44°33′38″N 08°51′00″E

Geography
- Location within Italy
- Location: Liguria and Piedmont, Italy
- Parent range: Ligurian Apennines

Climbing
- First ascent: ancestral
- Easiest route: hike

Monte Taccone is a mountain located between Liguria and Piedmont in north-western Italy. It is part of the Ligurian Apennines.

== Access to the summit ==
The mountain is accessible by signposted footpaths departing from Bocchetta Pass or Isoverde (municipality of Campomorone).

The Alta Via dei Monti Liguri, a long-distance trail from Ventimiglia (province of Imperia) to Bolano (province of La Spezia), passes very close to the mountain's summit.

== Nature conservation ==
The northern slopes of Monte Taccone are included in the Capanne di Marcarolo natural park.
