= Lago dell'Antenna =

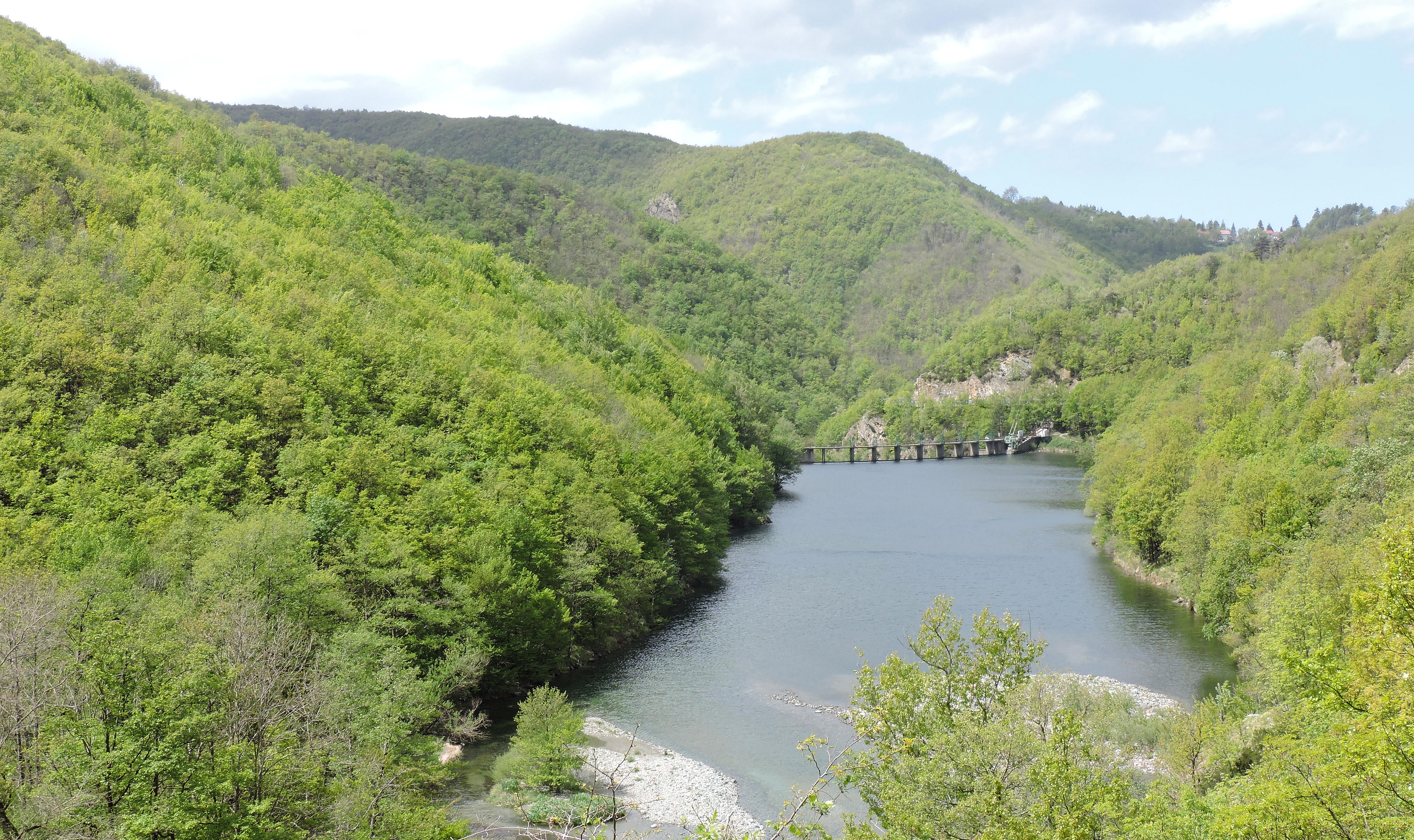
- The lake from provincial road nr. 40

- Location within Italy
- Location: Province of Genova, Liguria
- Coordinates: 44°28′52.25″N 8°35′49.13″E
- Type: artificial lake
- Primary inflows: Orba
- Primary outflows: Orba
- Basin countries: Italy
- Built: 1922 - 1946
- Surface area: 0.0225 km^{2} (0.0087 sq mi)
- Max. depth: 14.3 m (47 ft)
- Water volume: 0.000082 km^{3} (2.0×10^{−5} cu mi)
- Surface elevation: 557 m (1,827 ft)

Lago dell'Antenna is an artificial lake in north-west Italy, located in the Genoa (Liguria). Concerned comunes are Urbe and Sassello.

== Geography ==
The lake was created by blocking the Orba with a dam about two kilometres upstream of San Pietro d'Urbe, in order to produce electricity. Its name comes from Monte Antenna (821 m), a mountain which overlooks the left banks of the lake. The right banks of the reservoir are flanked by the provincial road nr. 40 Urbe - Vara - Passo del Faiallo and from Bric del Sozzo (650 m). The lake is located on the northern border of Parco naturale regionale del Beigua, which encompasses its left shore.

== History ==
Antenna lake was realised in 1922 in order to provide water to the hydroelectric power plant of the Cotonificio Ligure, located in San Pietro d'Orba. During the 1940s the reservoir capacity was considered insufficient and started dam extension works which ended in 1946, bringing the reservoir capacity up to around 50.000 m³. Present-day dam is a masonry arch-gravity dam; it finally inspection took place in February 1952. Nowadays the reservoir capacity is restricted by the sedimentation on the lake bed and is estimated to be around 30,000 m³.

== Fishing ==
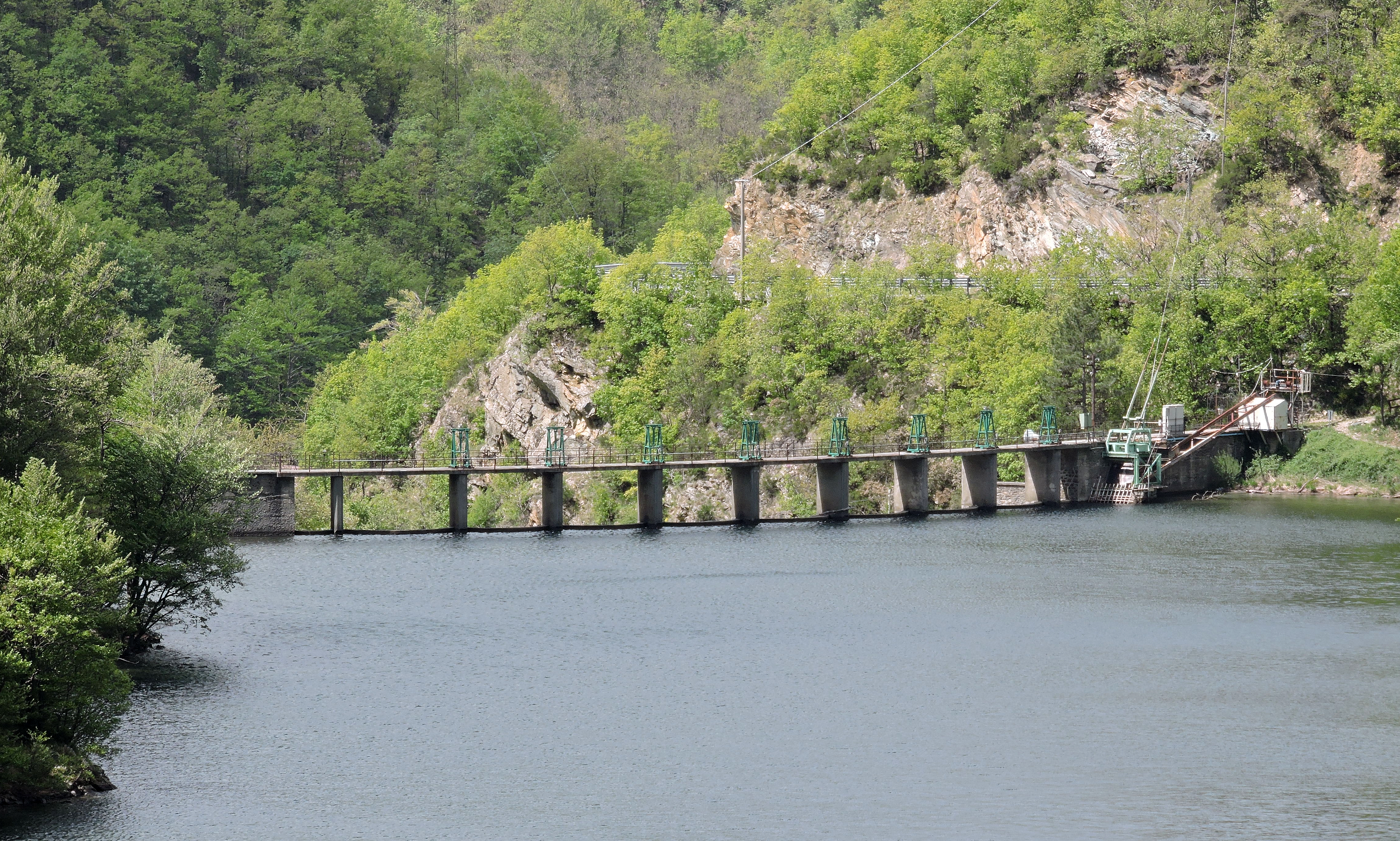
Antenna dam

Lake Antenna is classified, following Province of Savona fishing map, as a B category water body (Acque di categoria B), thus mixed population water. The lake is also defined as touristic fishing reserve (riserva di pesca turistica), and is restocked with rainbow trouts when authorised by Parco del Beigua. Restocking with brown trouts is not permitted because they are not considered native fish. The lake is the subject of a yearly fauna survey. Access rules are defined by Provincia di Savona administration.
