= Monte Ramaceto =

Mountain in Italy

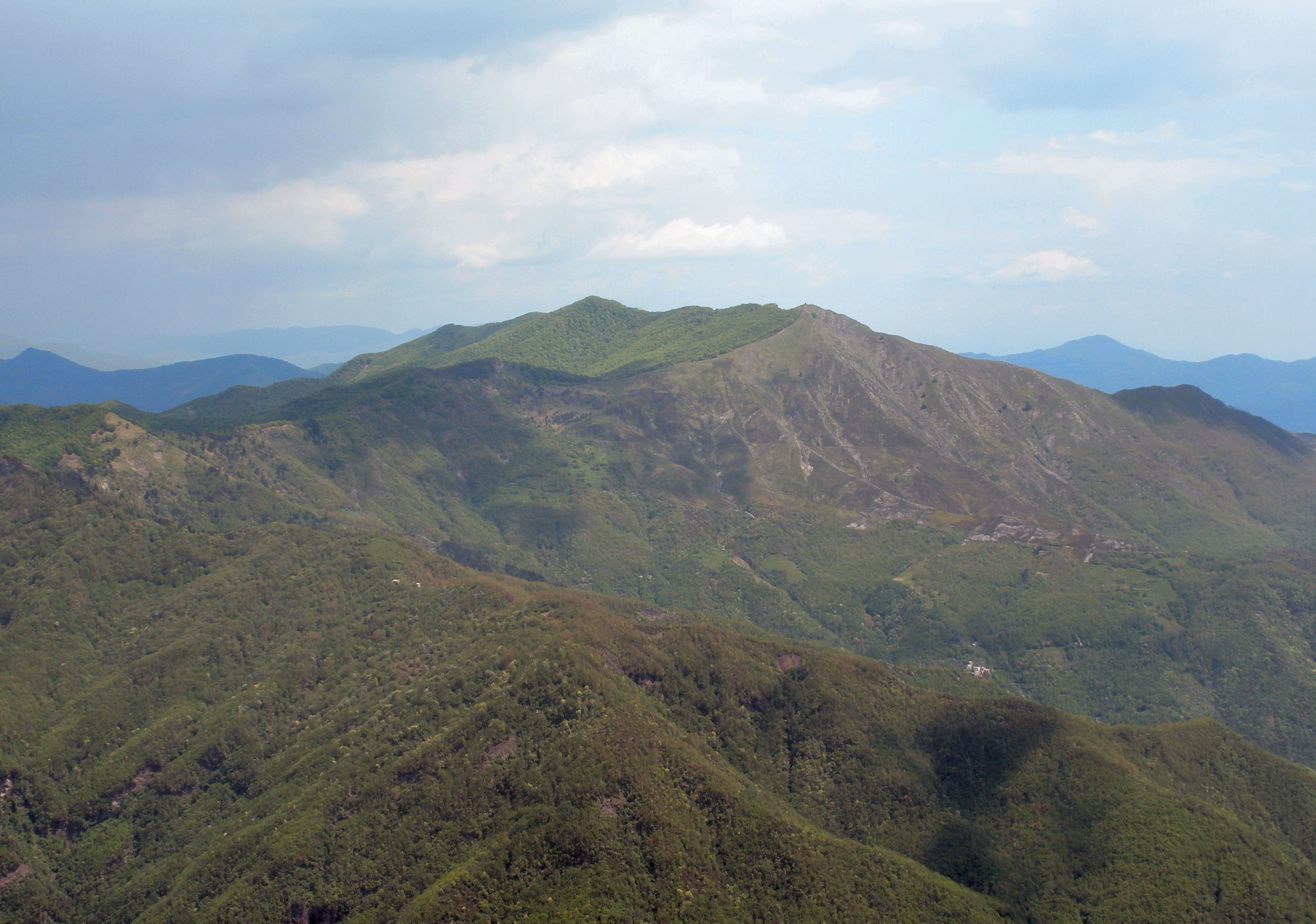

Highest point
- Elevation: 1,345 m (4,413 ft)
- Prominence: 470 m (1,540 ft)
- Coordinates: 44°25′N 9°22′E

Geography
- Location within Italy
- Location: Liguria, Italy
- Parent range: Ligurian Apennines

Monte Ramaceto is a mountain in Liguria, northern Italy, part of the Ligurian Apennines.

== Hiking ==
The mountain is accessible by off-road mountain paths and is crossed by the Alta Via dei Monti Liguri, a long-distance trail from Ventimiglia (province of Imperia) to Bolano (province of La Spezia).

== Nature conservation ==
The mountain and its surrounding area are part of a SIC (Site of Community Importance) called Monte Ramaceto (code: IT1331810 ).
