= Podenzana =

- Comune
- Comune di Podenzana
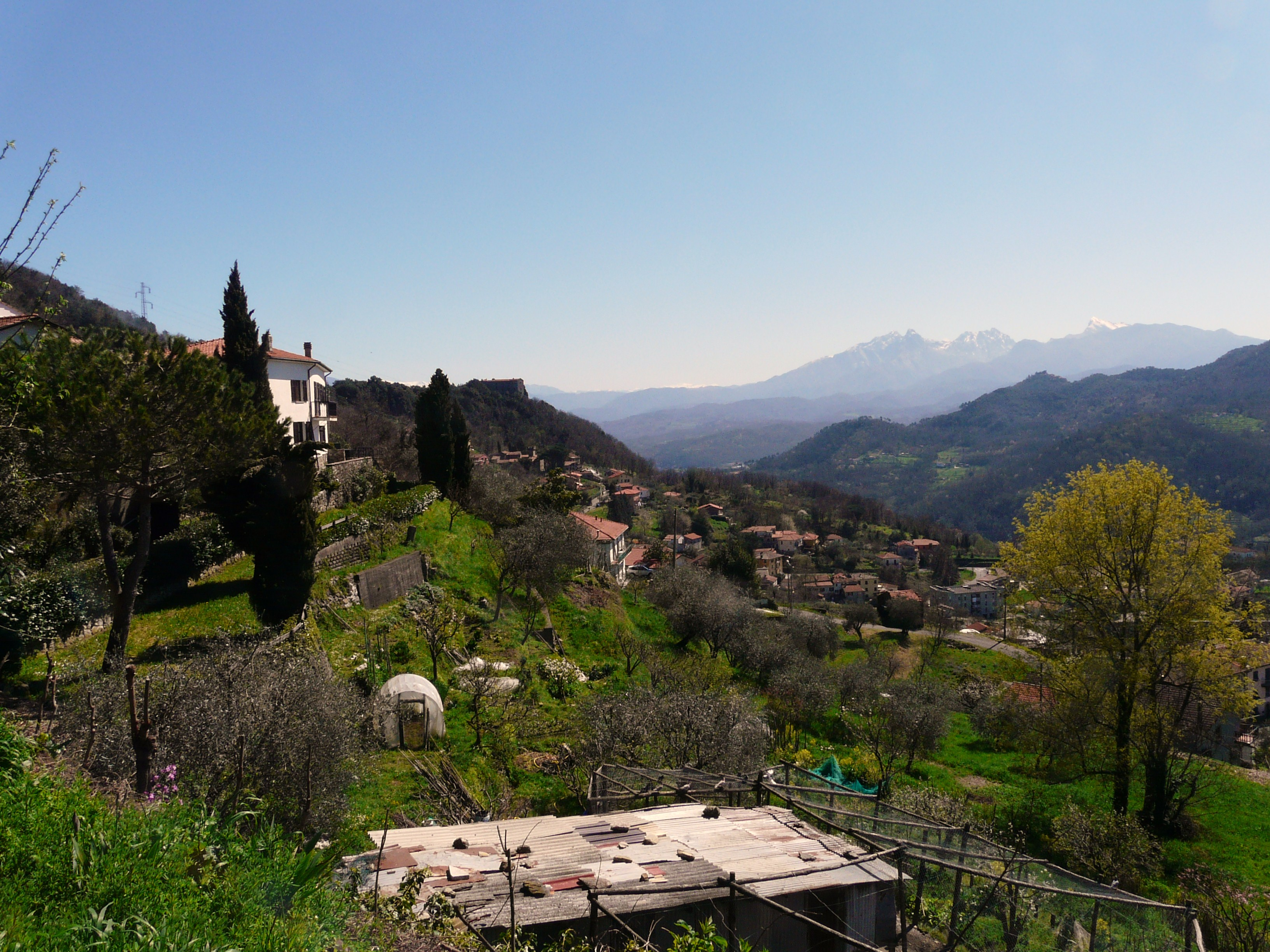
- Panorama of Podenzana

- Location within Italy Location within Tuscany
- Coordinates: 44°12′N 9°57′E
- Country: Italy
- Region: Tuscany
- Province: Massa and Carrara (MS)

Government
  - Mayor: Riccardo Varese

Area
  - Total: 17.3 km^{2} (6.7 sq mi)
- Elevation: 312 m (1,024 ft)

Population (Dec. 2004)
  - Total: 1,947
  - Density: 113/km^{2} (291/sq mi)
- Time zone: UTC+1 (CET)
  - Summer (DST): UTC+2 (CEST)
- Postal code: 54010
- Dialing code: 0187

Podenzana is a comune (municipality) in the Province of Massa and Carrara in the Italian region of Tuscany, located about 110 kilometres (68 mi) northwest of Florence and about 25 kilometres (16 mi) northwest of Massa. As of 31 December 2004, it had a population of 1,947 and an area of 17.3 square kilometres (6.7 mi^{2}).

Podenzana borders the following municipalities: Aulla, Bolano, Calice al Cornoviglio, Follo, Licciana Nardi, Tresana.

== Demographics ==
Historical population

Year	Pop.	±%
1861	1,622	—
1871	1,813	+11.8%
1881	1,797	−0.9%
1901	1,945	+8.2%
1911	1,886	−3.0%

Year	Pop.	±%
1921	1,981	+5.0%
1931	2,011	+1.5%
1936	2,043	+1.6%
1951	1,790	−12.4%
1961	1,571	−12.2%

Year	Pop.	±%
1971	1,302	−17.1%
1981	1,392	+6.9%
1991	1,661	+19.3%
2001	1,819	+9.5%

Source: Data from ISTAT
