= Licciana Nardi =

- Comune
- Comune di Licciana Nardi
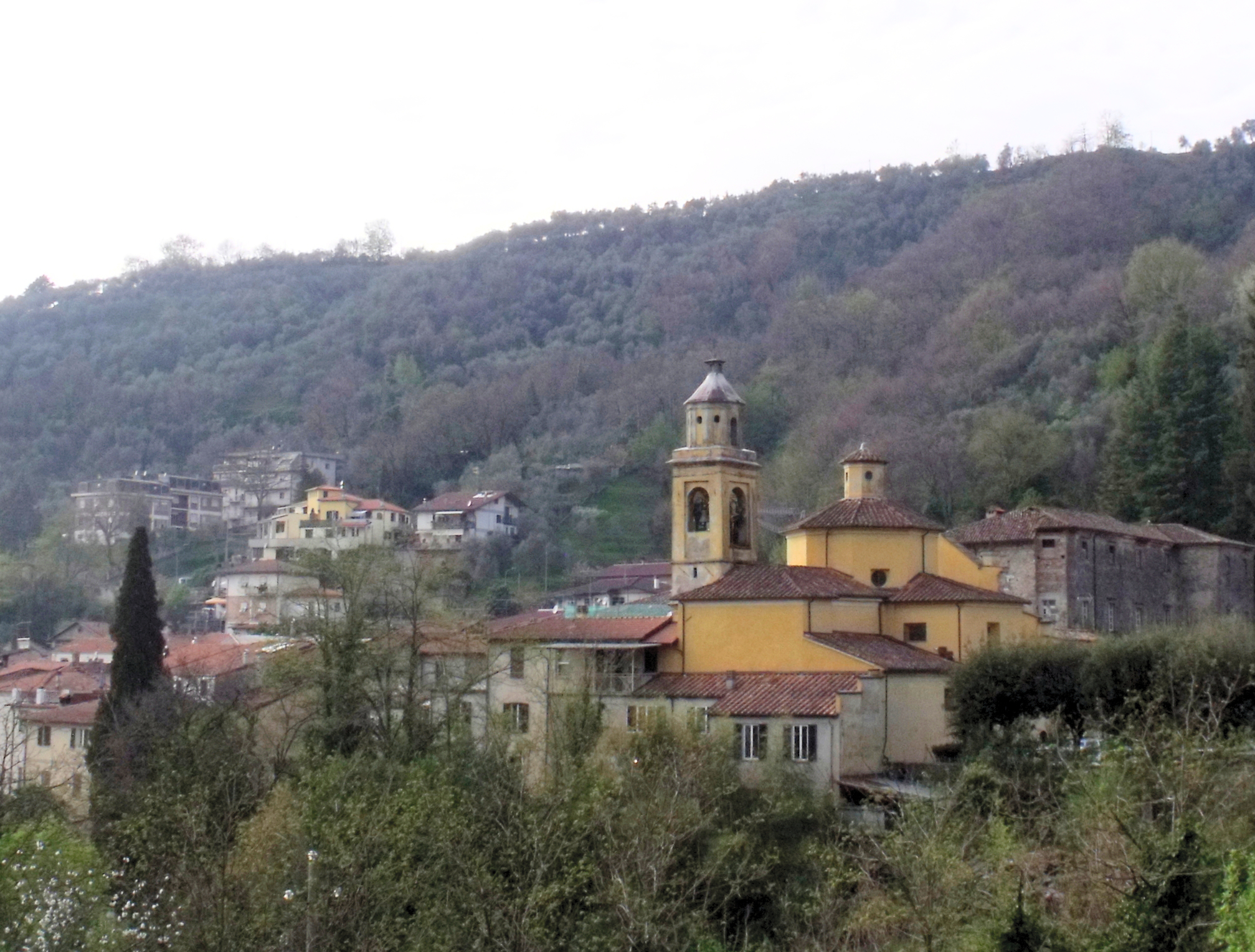
- View of Licciana Nardi

- Location within Italy Location within Tuscany
- Coordinates: 44°16′N 10°2′E
- Country: Italy
- Region: Tuscany
- Province: Massa and Carrara (MS)
- Frazioni: Monti, Amola, Apella, Bastia, Cisigliana, Costamala, Panicale, Paretola, Pontebosio, Tavernelle, Taponecco, Terrarossa, Varano, Villa.

Government
  - Mayor: Pierluigi Belli

Area
  - Total: 55.68 km^{2} (21.50 sq mi)
- Elevation: 210 m (690 ft)

Population (30 September 2017)
  - Total: 4,919
  - Density: 88.34/km^{2} (228.8/sq mi)
- Demonym: Liccianesi
- Time zone: UTC+1 (CET)
  - Summer (DST): UTC+2 (CEST)
- Postal code: 54016
- Dialing code: 0187
- Patron saint: Saint James the Greater
- Saint day: 25 July
- Website: Official website

Licciana Nardi is a comune (municipality) in the Province of Massa-Carrara in the Italian region of Tuscany, located about 110 kilometres (68 mi) northwest of Florence and about 25 kilometres (16 mi) northwest of Massa.

== Geography ==
The town lies in the Lunigiana region on the border between Tuscany and Liguria, with the Apuane Alps as a backdrop. It is only a few kilometres from Massa and La Spezia and near famous tourist spots as Lerici, Portovenere and the Cinque Terre. Licciana Nardi borders the following municipalities: Aulla, Bagnone, Comano, Fivizzano, Monchio delle Corti, Podenzana, Tresana, Villafranca in Lunigiana.

== History ==
In 1933, Licciana was surnamed Nardi in honour of local Italian patriot Anacarsi Nardi (1800–1844).

== Sister cities ==
- Somerton, United Kingdom
- Romagnat, France

== Notable people ==
Alceste De Ambris, early Italian socialist activist and sponsor of the Fasci d'Azione Rivoluzionaria
