= Follo, Liguria =

Follo
- Comune
- Comune di Follo
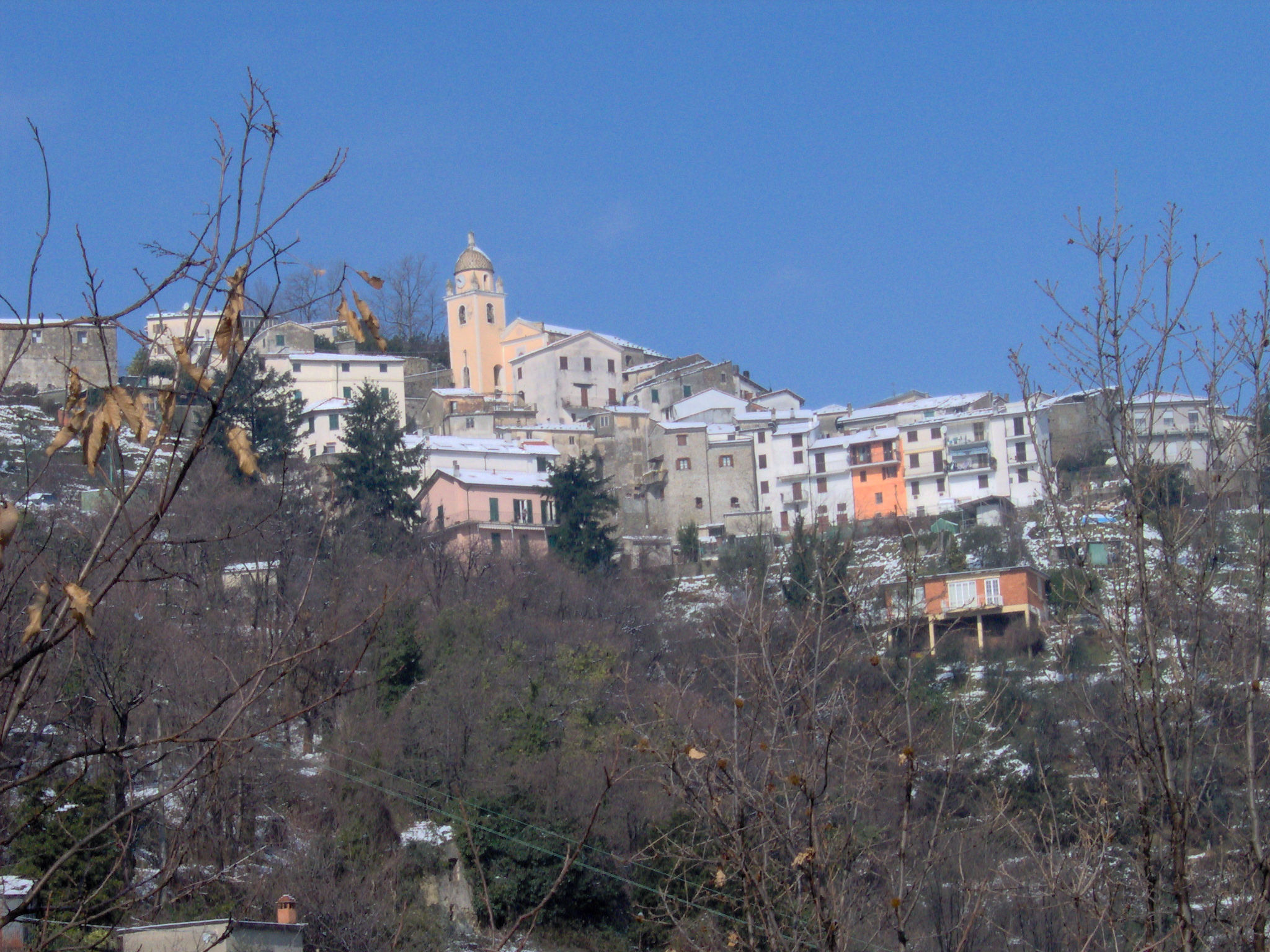
- Follo Castello.

- Coat of arms

- Location within Italy Location within Liguria
- Coordinates: 44°10′N 9°51′E
- Country: Italy
- Region: Liguria
- Province: La Spezia (SP)
- Frazioni: Bastremoli, Carnea, Follo Alto, Piana Battolla, Piano di Follo, Sorbolo, Tivegna, Torenco, Val Durasca, Via Romana

Government
  - Mayor: Giorgio Cozzani

Area
  - Total: 23.1 km^{2} (8.9 sq mi)
- Elevation: 70 m (230 ft)

Population (31 December 2008)
  - Total: 6,239
  - Density: 270/km^{2} (700/sq mi)
- Demonym: Follesi
- Time zone: UTC+1 (CET)
  - Summer (DST): UTC+2 (CEST)
- Postal code: 19020
- Dialing code: 0187
- Patron saint: St. Martin of Tours
- Saint day: 11 November
- Website: Official website

Follo (locally U Fulu) is a comune (municipality) in the Province of La Spezia in the Italian region Liguria, located about 80 kilometres (50 mi) southeast of Genoa and about 8 kilometres (5 mi) northeast of La Spezia, between the Val di Vara, the Gulf of La Spezia and the Val di Magra plain.

Follo borders the following municipalities: Beverino, Bolano, Calice al Cornoviglio, La Spezia, Podenzana, Riccò del Golfo di Spezia, and Vezzano Ligure.
