= Piani di Praglia =

Mountain in Italy

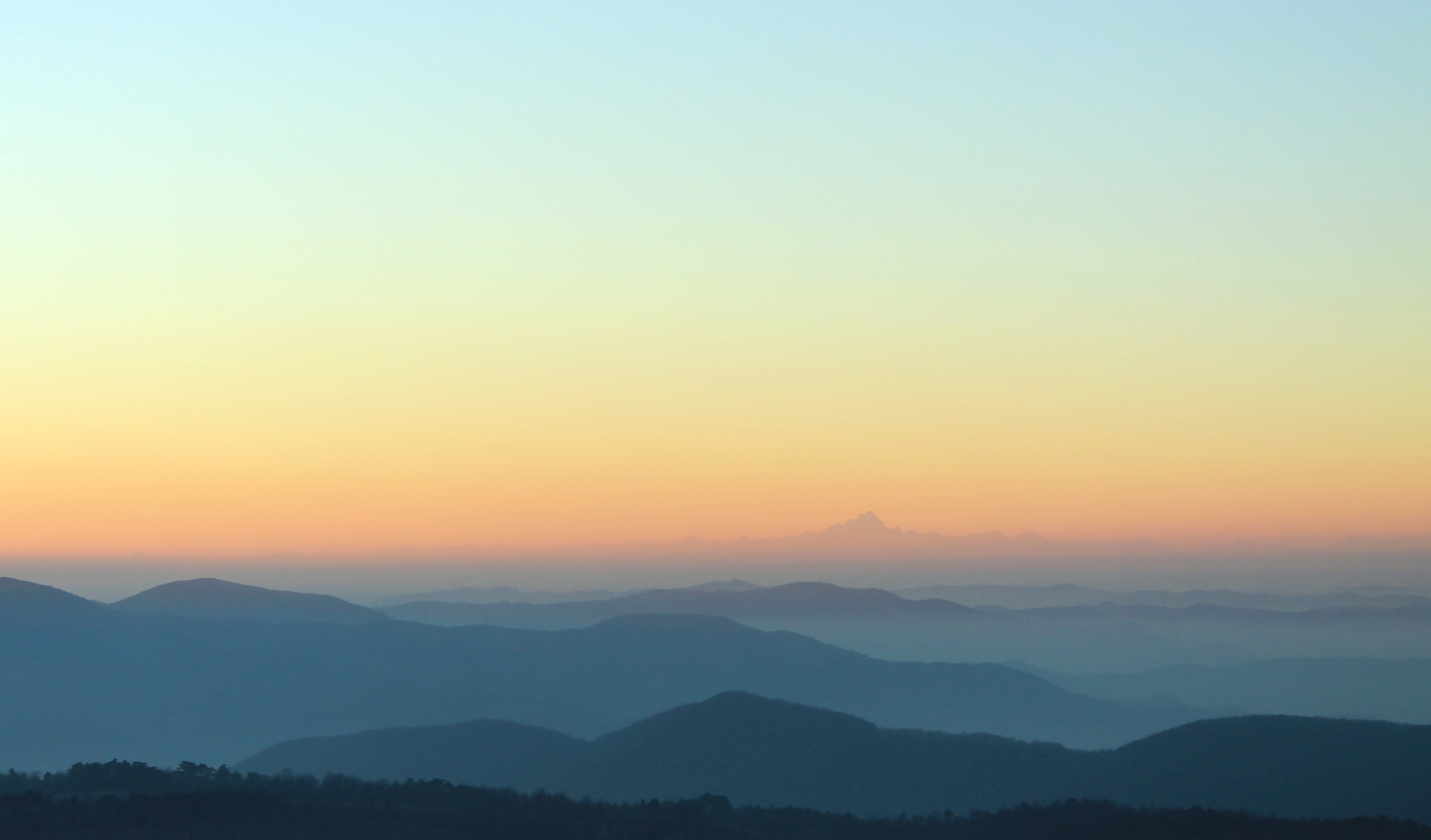
- Sunset from Piani di Praglia

Highest point
- Elevation: 840 m (2,760 ft)
- Coordinates: 44°30′54″N 8°48′25″E

Geography
- Location within Italy
- Location: Liguria, Italy
- Parent range: Ligurian Apennines

Piani di Praglia is a mountain in Liguria, northern Italy, part of the Ligurian Apennines.

== Hiking ==
The mountain is also accessible by off-road mountain paths and is crossed by the Alta Via dei Monti Liguri, a long-distance trail from Ventimiglia (province of Imperia) to Bolano (province of La Spezia).

== Nature conservation ==
The mountain and its surrounding area are part of a SIC (Site of Community Importance) called Praglia – Pracaban – M. Leco – P. Martin (code: IT1331501).
