= Bocchetta Pass =

Bocchetta pass
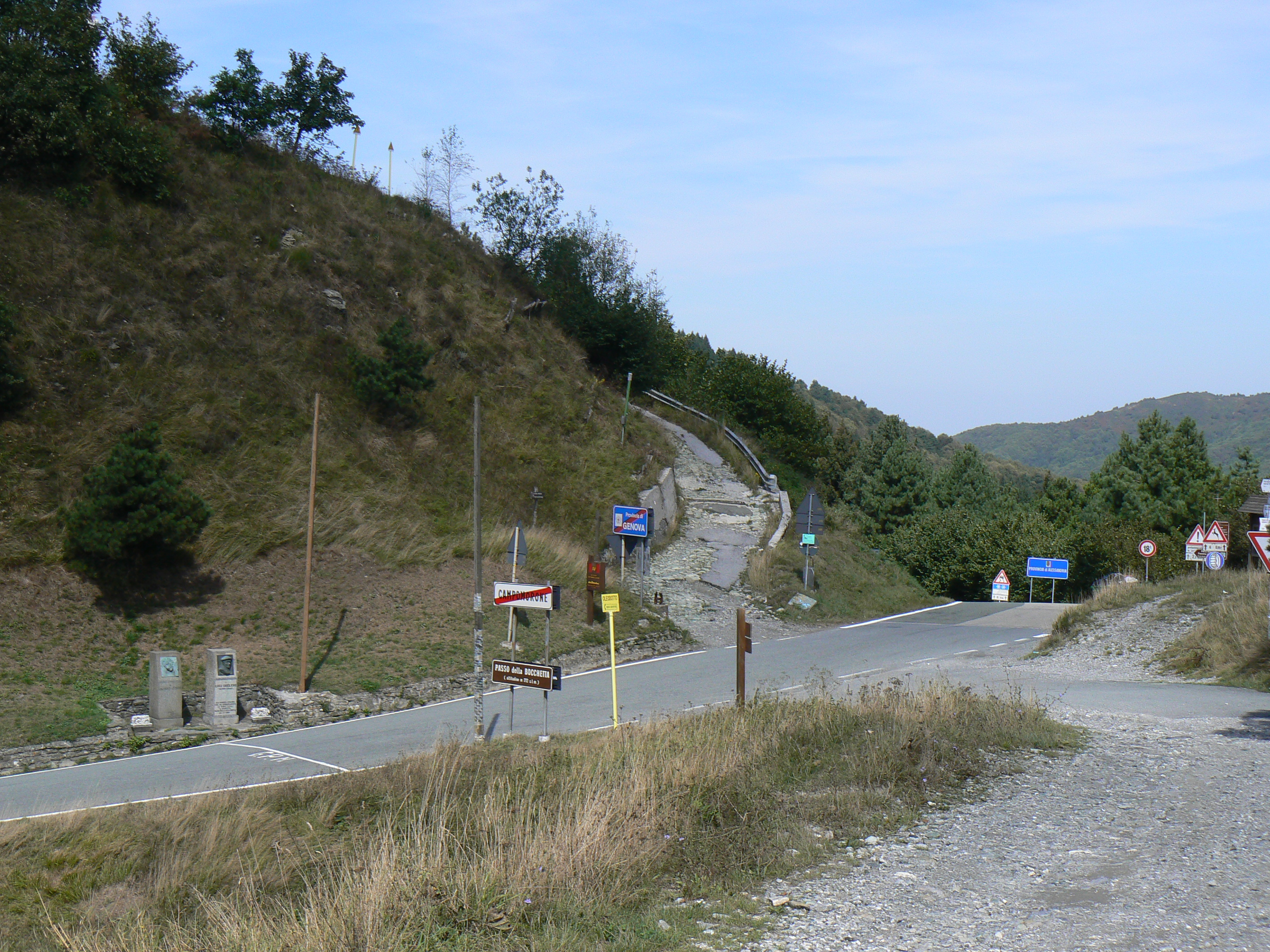
- Summit of Bocchetta Pass

- Location within Alps
- Elevation: 722 metres (2,369 ft)
- Traversed by: SP 5 della Bocchetta (GE); SP 160 della Val Lemme (AL)

Third Approach
- Location: Liguria–Piedmont border (Italy)
- Range: Apennines
- Coordinates: 44°33′02″N 08°53′16″E

Bocchetta Pass or Bochetta Pass or Passo della Bocchetta is a mountain pass in the Ligurian Apennine Mountains in Liguria north of Genoa, Italy. The summit of the pass is at an elevation of 772 meters (2,532 feet).

== Geography ==
It is crossed by a highway that connects Genoa and Alessandria. An old Roman road ran through Bocchetta Pass from Genua (modern Genoa) to Dertona (modern Tortona).

The Bocchetta Pass is located about 16 kilometres (10 mi) north of Genoa. From the south, the SP5 (Provincial) highway follows the Polcevera valley north from the town of Campomorone. From the north, the SP160 highway approaches the pass along the Lemme valley via the towns of Gavi and Voltaggio. Currently, most traffic uses the Autostrada A7 which runs through the mountains 4.5 kilometres (2.8 mi) to the east.

=== Hiking ===
The pass is also accessible by off-road mountain paths and is crossed by the Alta Via dei Monti Liguri, a long-distance trail from Ventimiglia (province of Imperia) to Bolano (province of La Spezia).

== History ==
The Roman consul Spurius Postumius Albinus Magnus had the Via Postumia built in 148 BC. The Roman road connected Genoa with Tortona, Piacenza, and Cremona. At Calvatone (known as Bedriacum in Roman times) the road forked and the northern branch went to Verona while the southern branch went to Mantua. During the French Revolutionary Wars the Bocchetta Pass was located in territory belonging to the Republic of Genoa. Its north side was guarded by the fortress of Gavi.

== See also ==
- List of mountain passes
