= Tresana =

- Comune
- Comune di Tresana
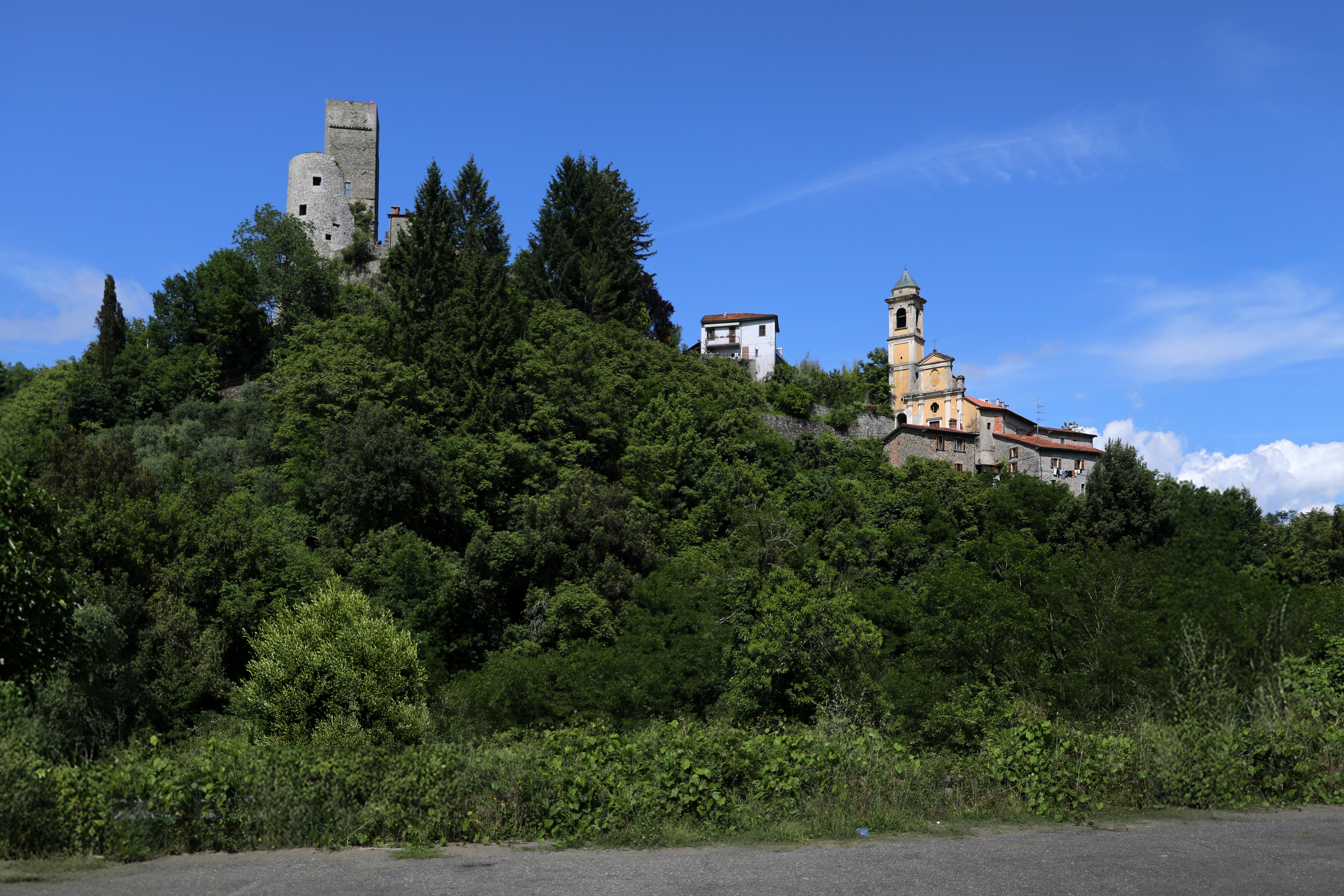
- Panorama of Tresana

- Location within Italy Location within Tuscany
- Coordinates: 44°14′N 9°57′E
- Country: Italy
- Region: Tuscany
- Province: Massa and Carrara (MS)
- Frazioni: Barbarasco, Bola, Careggia, Giovagallo, Novegigola, Riccò, Villa

Government
  - Mayor: Matteo Mastrini

Area
  - Total: 44.0 km^{2} (17.0 sq mi)
- Elevation: 112 m (367 ft)

Population (31 August 2015)
  - Total: 2,080
  - Density: 47.3/km^{2} (122/sq mi)
- Demonym: Tresanesi
- Time zone: UTC+1 (CET)
  - Summer (DST): UTC+2 (CEST)
- Postal code: 54012
- Dialing code: 0187
- Website: Official website

Tresana is a comune (municipality) in the Province of Massa and Carrara in the Italian region Tuscany, located about 120 kilometres (75 mi) northwest of Florence and about 25 kilometres (16 mi) northwest of Massa.

Tresana borders the following municipalities: Bolano, Calice al Cornoviglio, Licciana Nardi, Mulazzo, Podenzana, and Villafranca in Lunigiana.

Sights include the remains of the Malaspina Castle at Giovagallo.

== History ==
=== The Malaspina marquisate ===
Tresana emerged as a separate fief of the Spino Secco branch of the Malaspina, detached from Villafranca through Lusuolo shortly after 1470; its municipal statutes continued to derive from those of Villafranca. The first marquis, Guglielmo I, was invested by the emperor Charles V in 1521 and died at Tivoli in September 1527; the tradition, repeated by Litta, Repetti and Branchi, that he was killed in the revolt of Tresana, Barbarasco and Giovagallo in 1528 was disproved by Luigi Staffetti on the evidence of the letters of the Genoese commissioner at Sarzana.

=== The mint and the false coinage of 1598 ===
In 1571 the marquis Francesco-Guglielmo obtained the imperial privilege of opening a mint and striking coin bearing his own arms, making Tresana one of the small seigneurial mints of the Lunigiana. Under his successor Francesco the privilege was abused: in 1598 it emerged that the French master of the mint, Claudio Anglesi, and the lieutenant Castruccio Baldassari had struck counterfeit coin there bearing the types of France, Venice, Genoa, Bologna, Massa and Rome. A monitory of Pope Clement VIII followed, and the marquis was excommunicated; captured during the rising of 1603, he died in confinement at Mirandola in 1613, still under sentence.

=== End of the fief ===
The last Malaspina marquis, Guglielmo II, had the fief confiscated in 1634 and faced a general rising of his subjects between 1647 and 1652, put down by the Tuscan governor Pestalozzi. He was not assassinated, as Litta and Passerini state: on 6 January 1651 he was struck by apoplexy at table and died three days later, while it was his brother Giacomo who had been shot by the rebels in March 1650. After a Spanish interim the fiefs of Tresana and Castagnetoli were auctioned by the Regia Ducal Camera of Milan in January 1659; Bartolommeo di Filippo Corsini, marquis of Laiatico, held them in pledge from 2 May 1659 and in full possession from 7 May 1660. The Corsini — the family of Pope Clement XII — kept Tresana until the imperial fiefs of the Lunigiana were abolished by the edict of general Chabot on 2 July 1797.

In 1833 the community of Tresana, then in the Duchy of Modena and Reggio and seat of a jurisdiction in the vicariate of Giovagallo, had 2,373 inhabitants. The present comune was established in 1869.
