= Monte Baraccone =

Mountain in Liguria, Italy

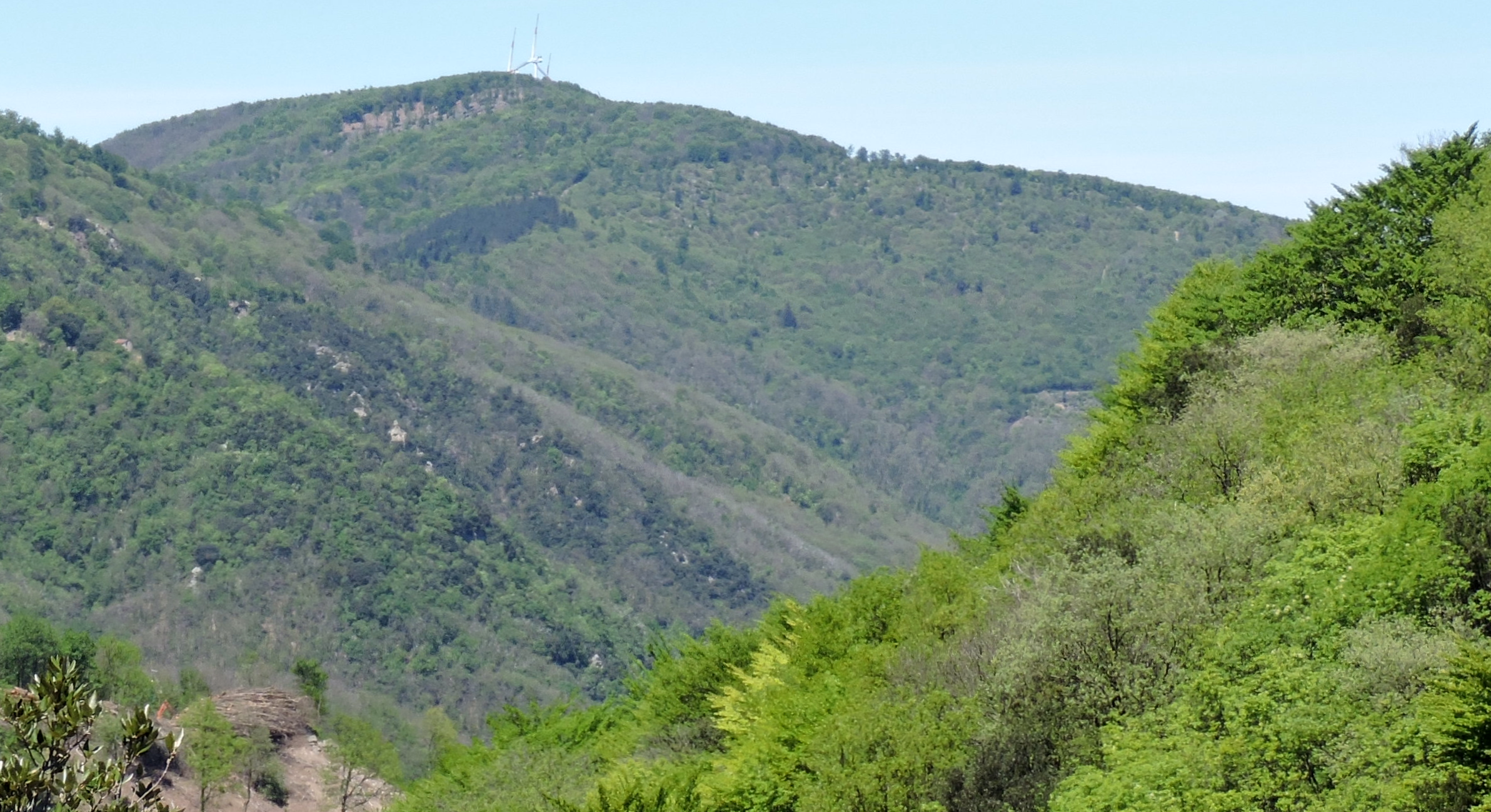
- The mountain seen from the maritime slope

Highest point
- Elevation: 819 m (2,687 ft)
- Prominence: 163 m (535 ft)
- Coordinates: 44°18′09.87″N 8°20′16.95″E

Geography
- Country: Italy
- Region: Liguria
- Parent range: Alps

The Monte Baraccone (819 a.s.l.) is a mountain in the Ligurian Prealps.

== Characteristics ==
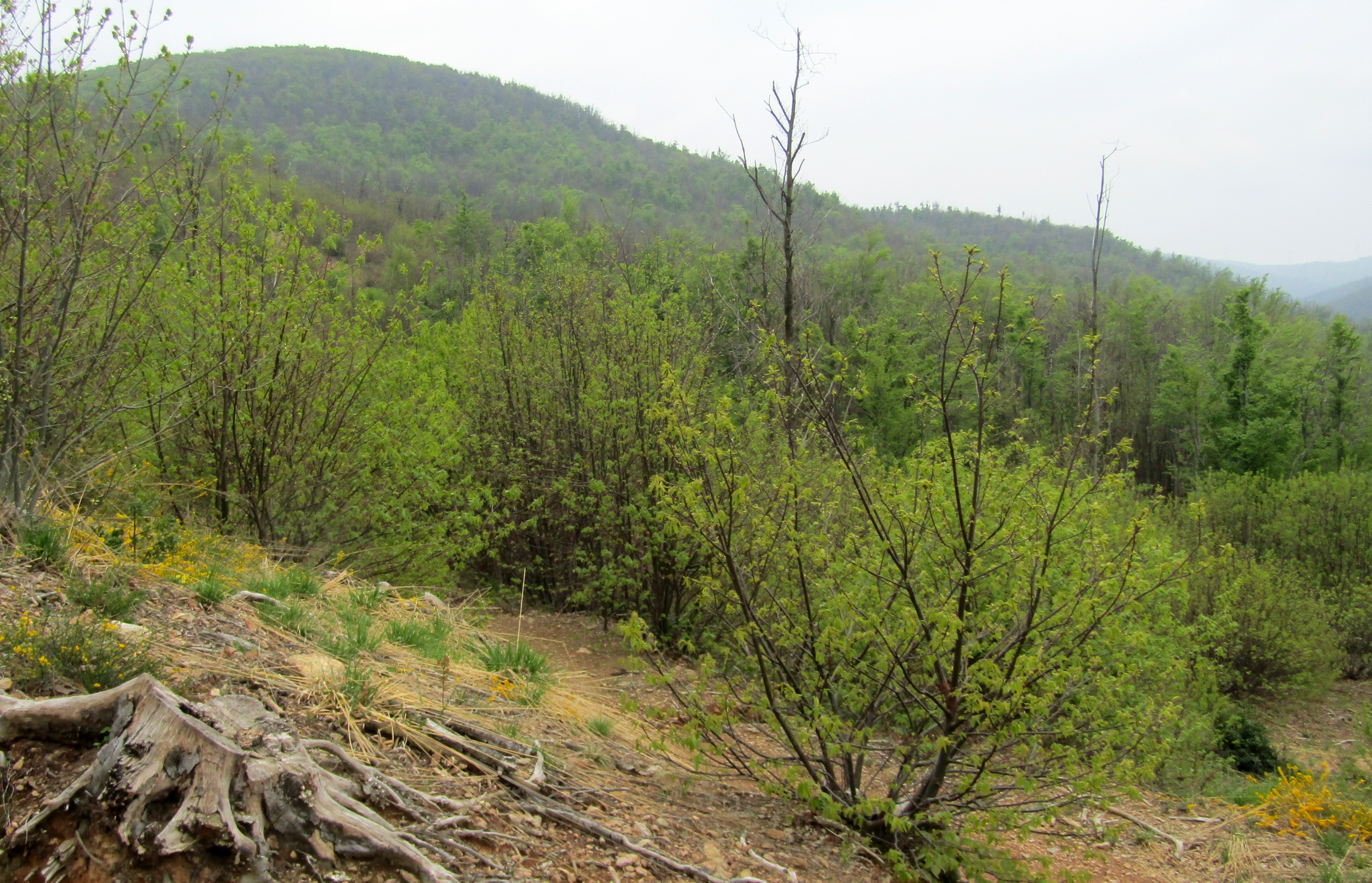
View from the Val Bormida

The mountain is a broad, wooded dome and is located on the Ligurian/Padan watershed; the Padan slope belongs to the municipality of Altare, while the slope facing the Ligurian Sea is part of Quiliano. It is one of the first Alpine peaks encountered starting from the Colle di Cadibona in a southwest direction. From its southwestern slopes, various tributaries of the Trexenda, one of the source branches of the Quiliano stream, originate.

Monte Baraccone is connected to the north with Monte Burot by a saddle at 721 meters elevation. To the southwest, the ridge continues descending to the Colle del Baraccone (649 m) and, after the Colla del Termine (662 m), ascends to Monte Alto. Its topographic prominence is 163 m. On the summit of the mountain, covered by dense woodland, some remains of a 19th-century battery are preserved. Slightly to the north, there is a wind farm consisting of five large turbines, in addition to which the construction of a second series of wind turbines is under consideration, to be located near the Forte Baraccone at the southern base of the mountain. The start of the works, authorized by the Province of Savona in 2016, has been postponed several times.

== History ==
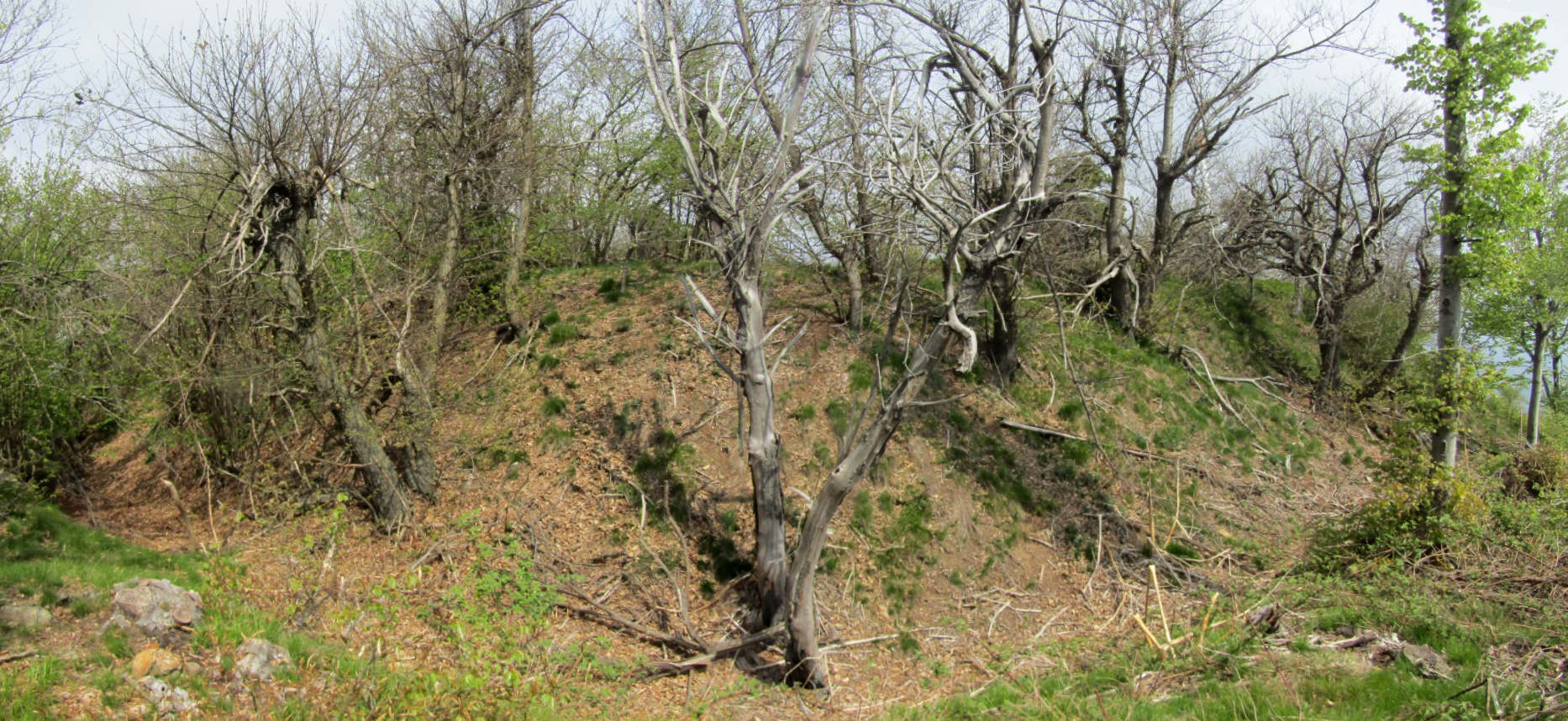
The summit of the mountain with the remains of 19th-century fortifications

The mountain takes its name from the Forte Baraccone, a Genoese military structure built at the end of the 17th century and located west of the summit, also on the Padan/Ligurian ridge. The Monte Baraccone area, along with the Colle di Cadibona and surrounding reliefs, was involved in hostilities related to the Italian campaign of Napoleon Bonaparte. More recently, the summit hosted a battery constructed as part of the fortification efforts along the Ligurian coast to counter a potential French attack. This was due to Italy’s adhesion to the Triple Alliance, which, by aligning it with the Central Powers, strained relations with the French Republic. The battery was part of the fortified complex of the Altare Barrier and served to cover the southwestern flank of the Forte Tagliata di Altare. What remains of the structure is now hidden in the dense vegetation covering the upper part of the mountain.

== Access ==
The wind farm

The mountain can be reached by dirt road starting from Altare, passing near Monte Burot and staying close to the ridge, arriving near the summit, or from the opposite side of the ridge starting from Colle del Termine. These are trails and dirt roads that are part of the Alta Via dei Monti Liguri.

== Bibliography ==
- Marazzi, Sergio (2005). Atlante Orografico delle Alpi. SOIUSA [Orographic Atlas of the Alps. SOIUSA] (in Italian). Pavone Canavese: Priuli & Verlucca. ISBN 9788880682738.
- Montagna, Euro; Montaldo, Lorenzo (1981). Alpi Liguri [Ligurian Alps]. Guida dei Monti d’Italia (in Italian). CAI-TCI.

=== Cartography ===
- Cartografia ufficiale italiana in scala 1:25.000 e 1:100.000 [Official Italian Cartography at Scales 1:25,000 and 1:100,000] (in Italian). Istituto Geografico Militare.
- Carta in scala 1:50.000 n. 15 Albenga, Alassio, Savona [Map at Scale 1:50,000 No. 15 Albenga, Alassio, Savona] (in Italian). Torino: Istituto Geografico Centrale. 2017. ISBN 978-8896455586.
