= Calice al Cornoviglio =

- Comune
- Comune di Calice al Cornoviglio
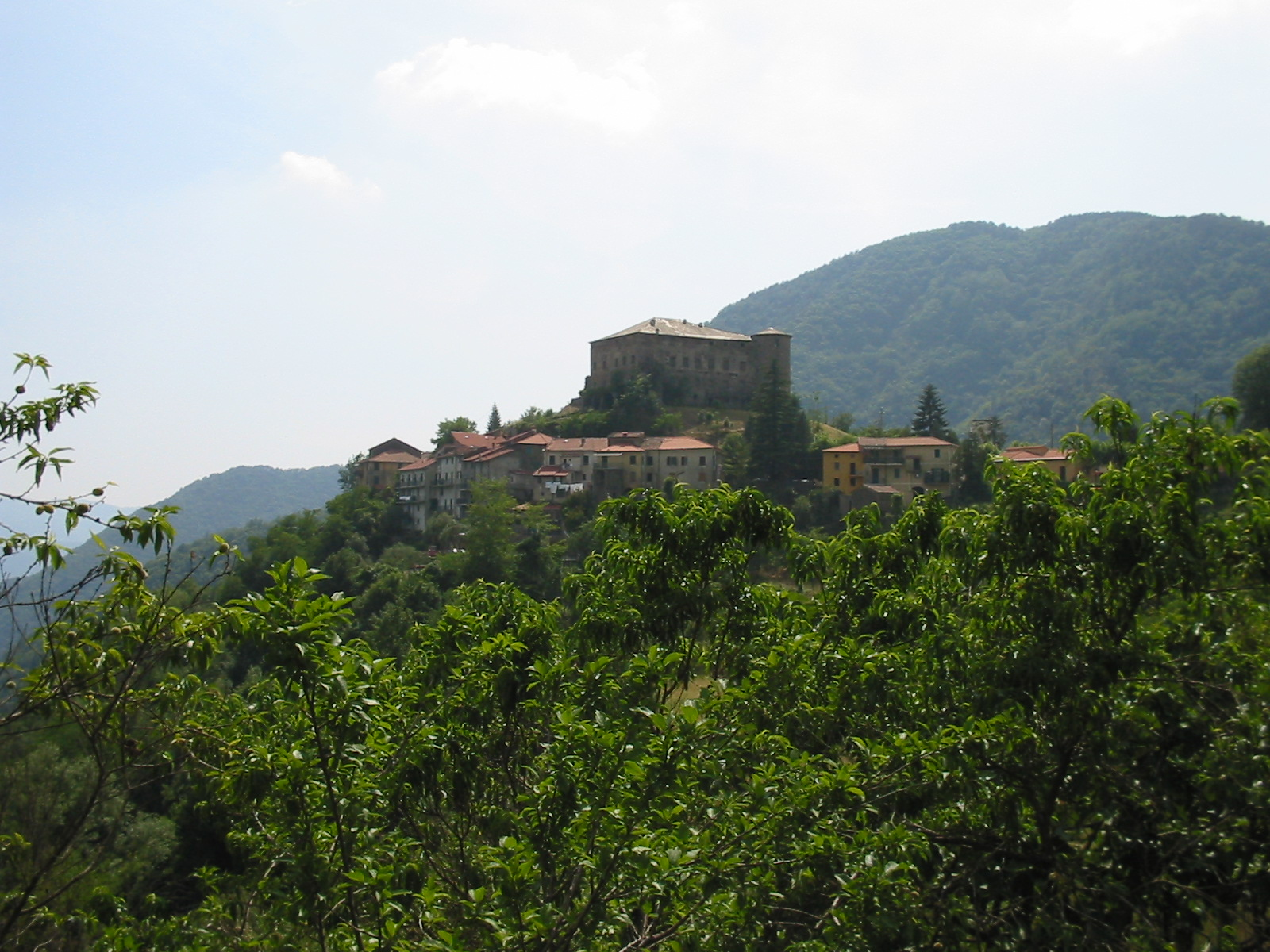
- Castle of Calice al Cornoviglio

- Coat of arms

- Location within Italy Location within Liguria
- Coordinates: 44°12′N 9°47′E
- Country: Italy
- Region: Liguria
- Province: La Spezia (SP)

Government
  - Mayor: Mario Scampelli

Area
  - Total: 34.1 km^{2} (13.2 sq mi)
- Elevation: 402 m (1,319 ft)

Population (31 December 2011)
  - Total: 1,144
  - Density: 33.5/km^{2} (86.9/sq mi)
- Demonym: Calicesi
- Time zone: UTC+1 (CET)
  - Summer (DST): UTC+2 (CEST)
- Postal code: 19020
- Dialing code: 0187

Calice al Cornoviglio is a comune (municipality) in the Province of La Spezia in the Italian region Liguria, located about 70 kilometres (43 mi) southeast of Genoa and about 11 kilometres (7 mi) north of La Spezia.

Calice al Cornoviglio borders the following municipalities: Beverino, Follo, Mulazzo, Podenzana, Rocchetta di Vara, Tresana.
