= Altare =

- Comune
- Comune di Altare
- Saint Eugene Church

- Coat of arms

- Location within Italy Location within Liguria
- Coordinates: 44°20′10.32″N 08°21′38.4″E
- Country: Italy
- Region: Liguria
- Province: Province of Savona (SV)

Government
  - Mayor: Giuseppe Flavio Genta

Area
  - Total: 11.7 km^{2} (4.5 sq mi)
- Elevation: 398 m (1,306 ft)

Population (2011)
  - Total: 2,162
  - Density: 185/km^{2} (479/sq mi)
- Demonym: Altaresi
- Time zone: UTC+1 (CET)
  - Summer (DST): UTC+2 (CEST)
- Postal code: 17041
- Dialing code: +39 019
- Patron saint: S.Rocco
- Saint day: 16 August
- Website: Official website

Altare (Ligurian: Artâ, Piedmontese: Latè, L’Atæ in local dialect) is a comune (municipality) in the Province of Savona in the Italian region Liguria, located about 45 km (28 mi) west of Genoa and about 11 km (6.8 mi) northwest of Savona. As of 1 January 2009, it had a population of 2,160 and an area of 11.7 km^{2} (4.5 sq mi).

Altare borders the following municipalities: Cairo Montenotte, Carcare, Mallare, Quiliano, and Savona.

== Geography ==
Altare is just west of the Cadibona pass, which at 459 m (1,506 ft) divides the Ligurian Alps from the Ligurian Apennines. Also called pass of Altare, it is accessed from the coast by the Via Nazionale Piemonte, winding up from Savona and crossing into Piedmont towards the north Italian plain.

== History ==
Altare was home to an ancient glassmaking tradition, dating back to the Middle Ages. The origin of Altare glassworks is still unknown. Oral tradition has it that the art was spread from Northern France by Benedictine monks. Samuel Kurinsky posits that the original glassmakers were Sephardic Jews, based on the secretive character of their techniques and the distinct identity of the glassmakers as opposed to the rest of the population. If that is the case, they were completely assimilated, except for their traditional self-distinction.

Altarist glassmakers were organized in guilds, not unlike other medieval craftsmen. The glassmakers guild in Altare was founded in 1856 as Società artistico-vetraria d'Altare. The guild, known as the University, maintained a strict control over the glassmakers' techniques.

== Altaresi in Europe ==
Unlike the Venetians though, Altare was a net exporter of know-how throughout its history, as the local guild was never able to prevent the migration of its people to other places. Sometimes it even encouraged it. The importance of Altare revolves around this difference. For example, it appears that Giobatta Da Costa's invention of flint glass took place in London, while he worked for the Ravenscroft manufactory in 1674. It is reported that the first glassmaker of Pisa, around 1592, was from Altare. Altarist glassmakers operated in France, at Orléans and Nevers and one of them, Bernard Perrot went on to become master of the Royal Glassworks in Orléans, after patenting many innovative techniques.

== Altaresi in South America ==
There was a migration of Altarese glass-makers to South America, primarily Argentina. A group of glassmakers left Altare in 1947 to establish themselves in the province of Santa Fe, Argentina. There they started an industry of glass-making that remains active. They brought with them the European style glass blowing tradition, yet eventually they developed a cross-cultural style combining the European and Argentinean esthetics.

== Museum of Glass ==
The Museum of Glass in Villa Rosa at Altare preserves many pieces of industrial and art glass produced in the region. The museum is housed in an Art Nouveau building that is a culturally protected edifice.

== See also ==
- Monte Baraccone
