= Urbe =

- Comune
- Comune di Urbe
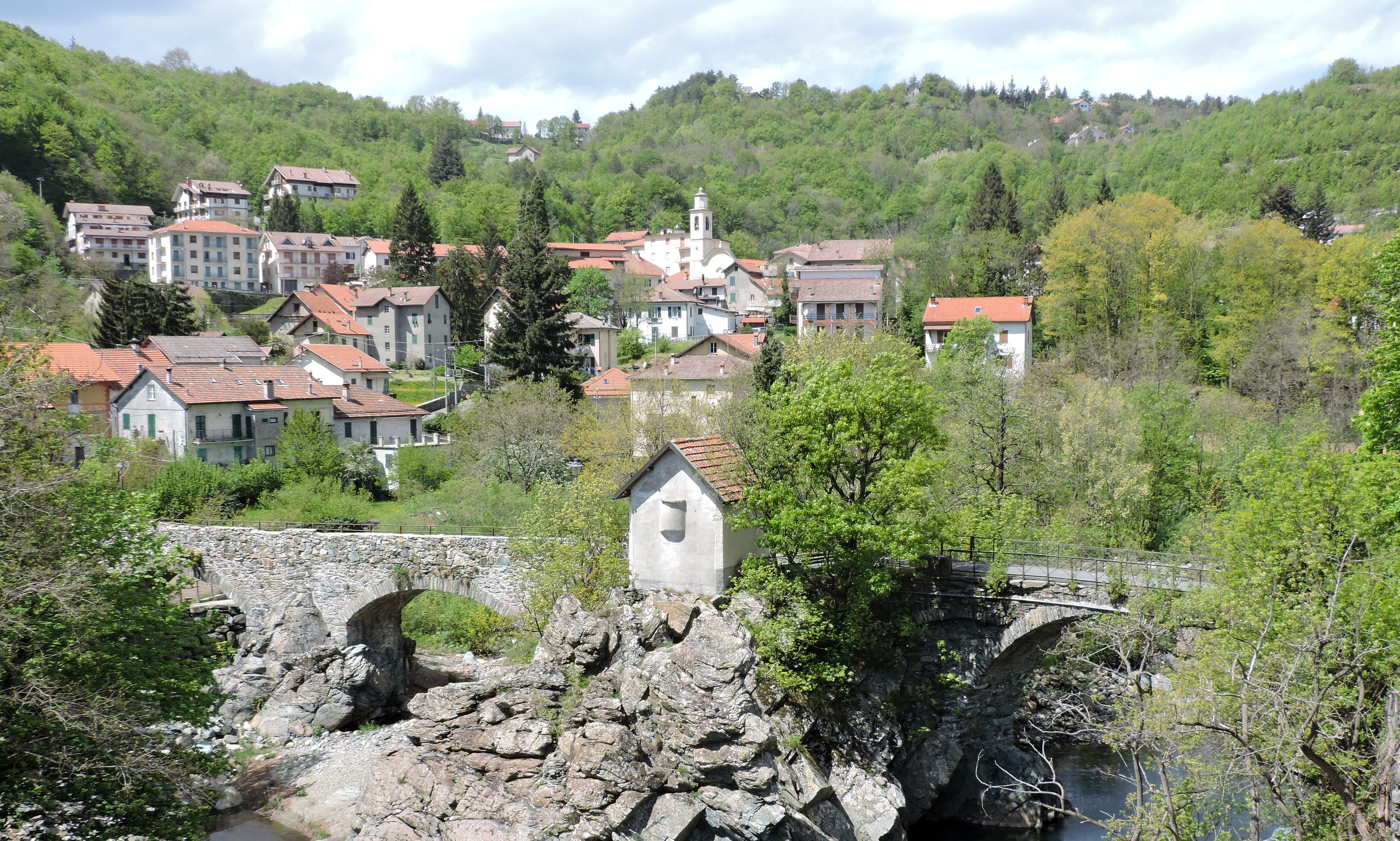

- Coat of arms

- Location within Italy Location within Liguria
- Coordinates: 44°30′4″N 8°38′27″E
- Country: Italy
- Region: Liguria
- Province: Province of Savona (SV)
- Frazioni: Acquabianca, Martina, San Pietro, Vara Inferiore, Vara Superiore

Area
  - Total: 31.5 km^{2} (12.2 sq mi)
- Elevation: 540 m (1,770 ft)

Population (Dec. 2004)
  - Total: 847
  - Density: 26.9/km^{2} (69.6/sq mi)
- Demonym: Urbaschi
- Time zone: UTC+1 (CET)
  - Summer (DST): UTC+2 (CEST)
- Postal code: 17040
- Dialing code: 019
- Website: Official website

Urbe (Genoese: L'Orba, locally R'Urba or L'Urba) is a comune (municipality) in the Province of Savona in the Italian region Liguria, located about 30 kilometres (19 mi) northwest of Genoa and about 25 kilometres (16 mi) northeast of Savona. As of 31 December 2004, it had a population of 847 and an area of 31.5 square kilometres (12.2 mi^{2}).

== Geography ==
The municipality of Urbe contains the frazioni (subdivisions, mainly villages and hamlets) Acquabianca, Martina, San Pietro, Vara Inferiore, and Vara Superiore.

Urbe borders the following municipalities: Genoa, Ponzone, Sassello, and Tiglieto.

== Demographic evolution ==
Historical population

Year	Pop.	±%
1861	2,287	—
1871	2,382	+4.2%
1881	2,388	+0.3%
1901	2,462	+3.1%
1911	2,570	+4.4%

Year	Pop.	±%
1921	2,665	+3.7%
1931	2,265	−15.0%
1936	1,813	−20.0%
1951	1,837	+1.3%
1961	1,503	−18.2%

Year	Pop.	±%
1971	1,233	−18.0%
1981	1,020	−17.3%
1991	820	−19.6%
2001	869	+6.0%

Source: Data from ISTAT

== See also ==
- Lago dell'Antenna
