= Punta Martin =

Mountain in Italy

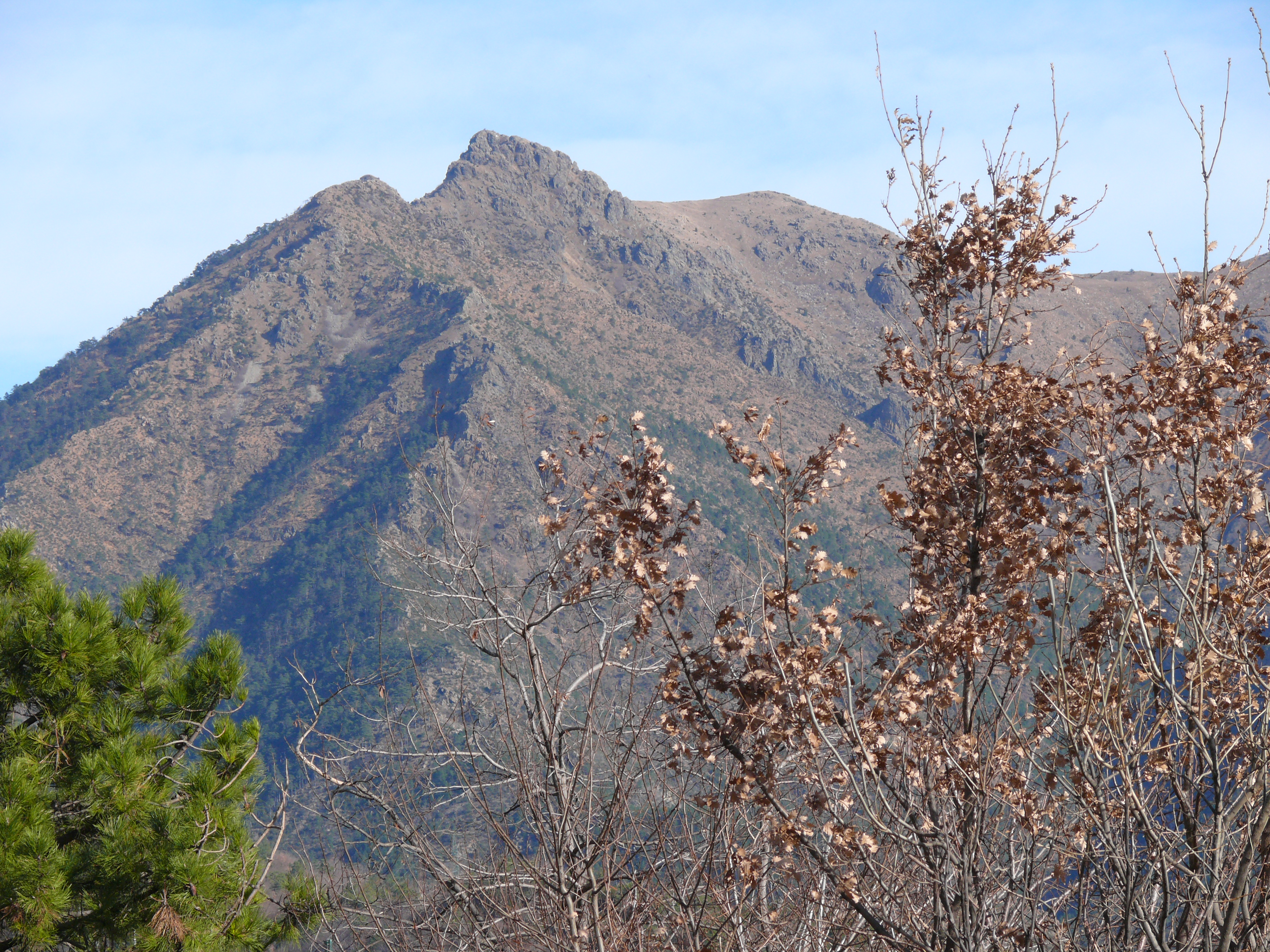

Highest point
- Elevation: 1,001 m (3,284 ft)
- Prominence: 157 m (515 ft)
- Coordinates: 44°28′43″N 8°47′21″E

Geography
- Location within Italy
- Location: Liguria, Italy
- Parent range: Ligurian Apennines

Punta Martin is a mountain in Liguria, northern Italy, part of the Ligurian Apennines. It is located in the province of Genoa. It lies at an altitude of 1001 metres.

== Nature conservation ==
The mountain and its surrounding area are part of a SIC (Site of Community Importance) called Praglia – Pracaban – M. Leco – P. Martin (code: IT1331501).
