= Innocenzio Taccone =

Italian painter

Innocenzio Taccone was an Italian painter of the Baroque period.

Taccone was born in Bologna and was a pupil and relative of Annibale Carracci. In 1600, he accompanied Carracci to Rome, where he assisted him in many of his works. In the vault of the church of Santa Maria del Popolo, he painted three large frescoes based on designs by Annibale, representing the Coronation of the Virgin, Christ appearing to St. Peter, and Assumption of St. Paul. He also painted scenes from the Life of St. Andrew the Apostle for a chapel in S. Angelo in Pescheria. Taccone died in Rome, in the prime of life, during the pontificate of Urban VIII (1623–1644).
