= Colle di Cadibona =

Mountain pass in Italy

Colle di Cadibona / Bocchetta di Altare
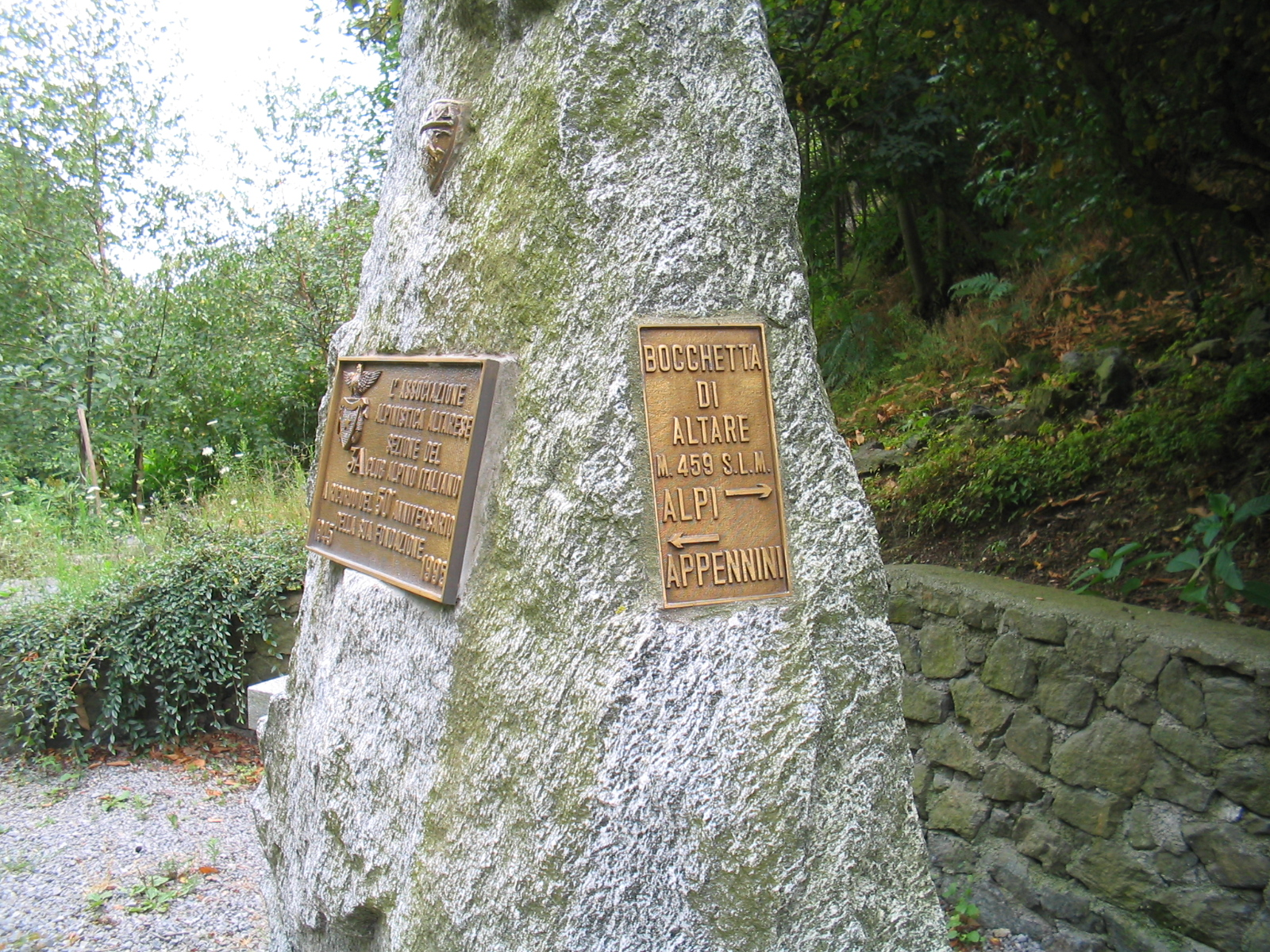
- The monument showing the border between Alps and Apennines

- Location within Alps
- Elevation: 459 m (1,506 ft)
- Traversed by: SP 81 di Vallenzona (ligurian side)

Location
- Location: Province of Savona; Italy
- Range: Apennine Mountains; Ligurian Alps
- Coordinates: 44°20′03″N 8°20′57″E

Colle di Cadibona - 436 m (1,430 ft) - is a mountain pass between Savona and Altare in the Ligurian Alps, delineating the traditional boundary between the Alps and the Apennine Mountains. It is also known as Bocchetta di Altare. On the south-eastern side of the Alps Godovič Pass (Slovenia) conventionally represents the opposite end of the Alpine range.

== History ==
The pass was considered in Roman times as the boundary between the Alpine and Apennine systems, since in this part of the basin the elevation of the pass is still the lowest level of the Apennine basin up to the Marcellinara saddle in Calabria."

Although it had already been exploited by 8,000 Mago Barsa soldiers during the Second Punic War during the retreat of the Carthaginian army from the Po valley in 203 BC, the first real road through the pass was opened by the Roman consul Marcus Aemilius Scaurus in 109 BC to connect the port of Vada Sabatia, modern Vada Ligure, with the city of Dertona, modern Tortona. The road was part of the Via Emilia Scauris.

== See also ==
- Monte Baraccone
