= Bolano =

Bolano Bolan
- Comune
- Comune di Bolano
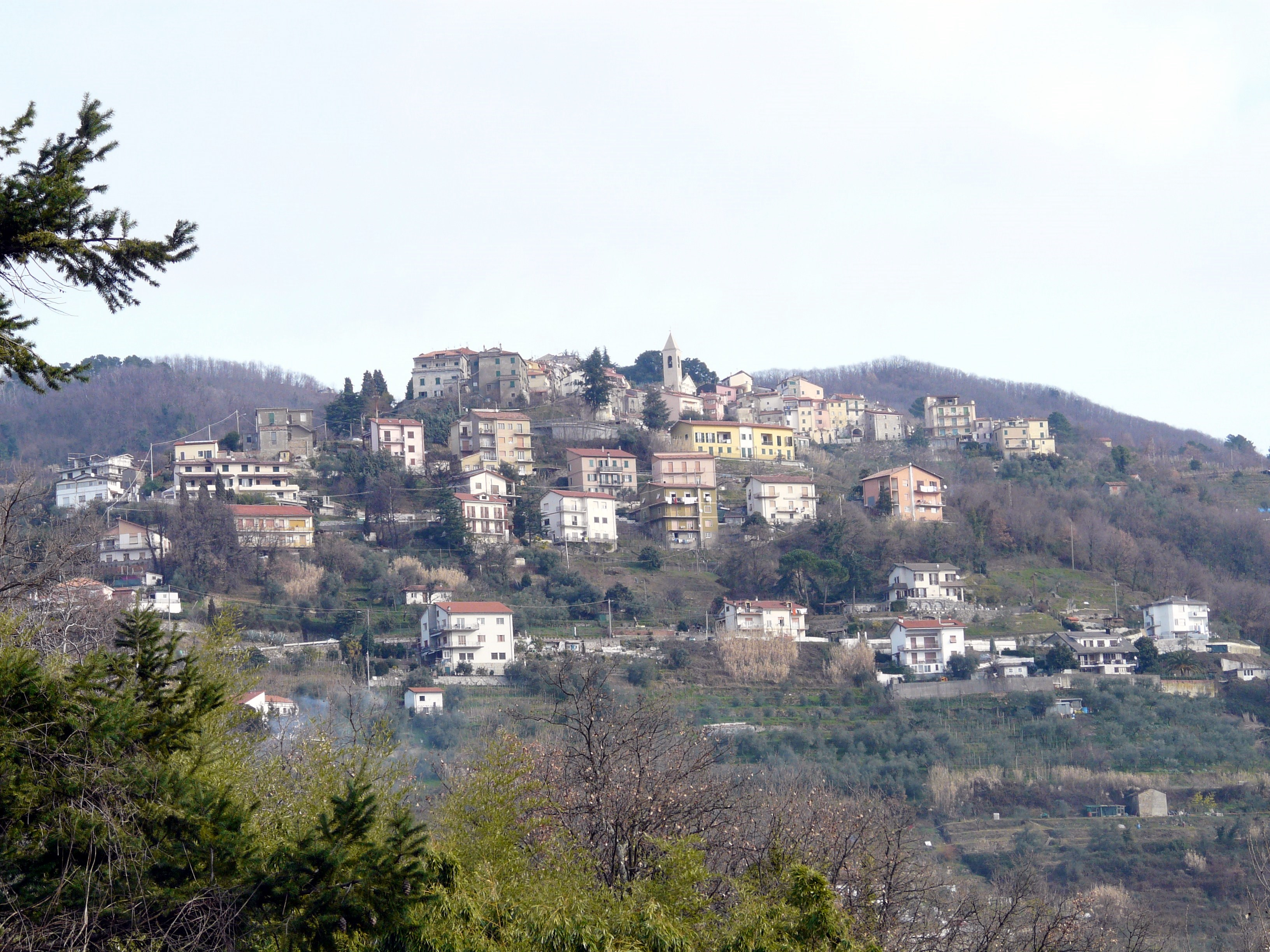
- Bolano

- Coat of arms

- Location within Italy Location within Liguria
- Coordinates: 44°11′N 9°54′E
- Country: Italy
- Region: Liguria
- Province: Province of La Spezia (SP)

Area
  - Total: 14.7 km^{2} (5.7 sq mi)

Population (Dec. 2004)
  - Total: 7,490
  - Density: 510/km^{2} (1,320/sq mi)
- Demonym: Bolanesi
- Time zone: UTC+1 (CET)
  - Summer (DST): UTC+2 (CEST)
- Postal code: 19020
- Dialing code: 0187
- Website: Official website

Bolano (Ligurian: Bolan) is a comune (municipality) in the Province of La Spezia in the Italian region Liguria, located about 80 kilometres (50 mi) southeast of Genoa and about 11 kilometres (7 mi) northeast of La Spezia. As of 31 December 2004, it had a population of 7,490 and an area of 14.7 square kilometres (5.7 mi^{2}).

Bolano borders the following municipalities: Aulla, Follo, Podenzana, Santo Stefano di Magra, Tresana, Vezzano Ligure.

== Famous people from Bolano ==
- Marco Lucchinelli, motorcycle road racer
- Massimo Podenzana, road bicycle racer

== Demographic evolution ==
Historical population

Year	Pop.	±%
1861	1,988	—
1871	2,120	+6.6%
1881	1,929	−9.0%
1901	2,136	+10.7%
1911	2,144	+0.4%

Year	Pop.	±%
1921	2,277	+6.2%
1931	2,542	+11.6%
1936	2,701	+6.3%
1951	3,068	+13.6%
1961	3,131	+2.1%

Year	Pop.	±%
1971	4,347	+38.8%
1981	7,073	+62.7%
1991	7,060	−0.2%
2001	7,391	+4.7%

Source: Data from ISTAT
