= Parco naturale regionale del Beigua =

- Beigua Geopark
- IUCN category V (protected landscape/seascape)
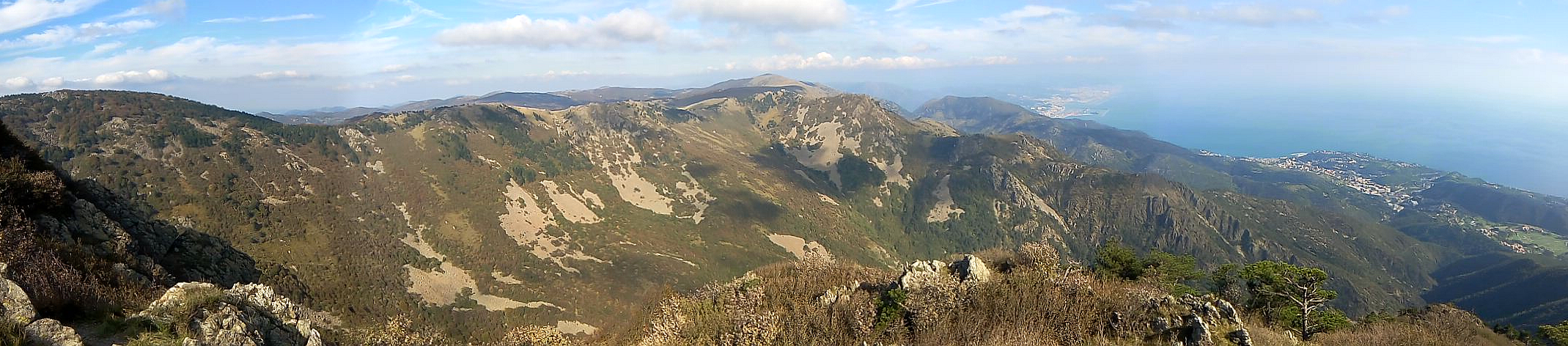

- Location within Italy
- Location: Liguria, Italy
- Nearest city: Savona and Genoa
- Coordinates: 44°25′58″N 8°32′55″E
- Area: 8,715 ha (21,540 acres)
- Established: 1985, 1995
- Governing body: Ente Parco del Beigua (Arenzano)
- Website: www.parcobeigua.it

The Beigua Natural Regional Park (in Italian Parco naturale regionale del Beigua) is a natural park located in province of Savona and the Metropolitan City of Genoa, both in Liguria (Italy). It's the largest protected area of the region. It gets the name from the highest mountain of the area, Monte Beigua.

== History ==
The natural park was established by the l.r. (regional law, in Italian legge regionale) nr. 16 April the 9th 1985 as modified by the l.r. nr. 12 February the 22nd 1995.

During March 2005 the Beigua Geopark was recognised as a part of the European Geoparks Network.

== Geography ==
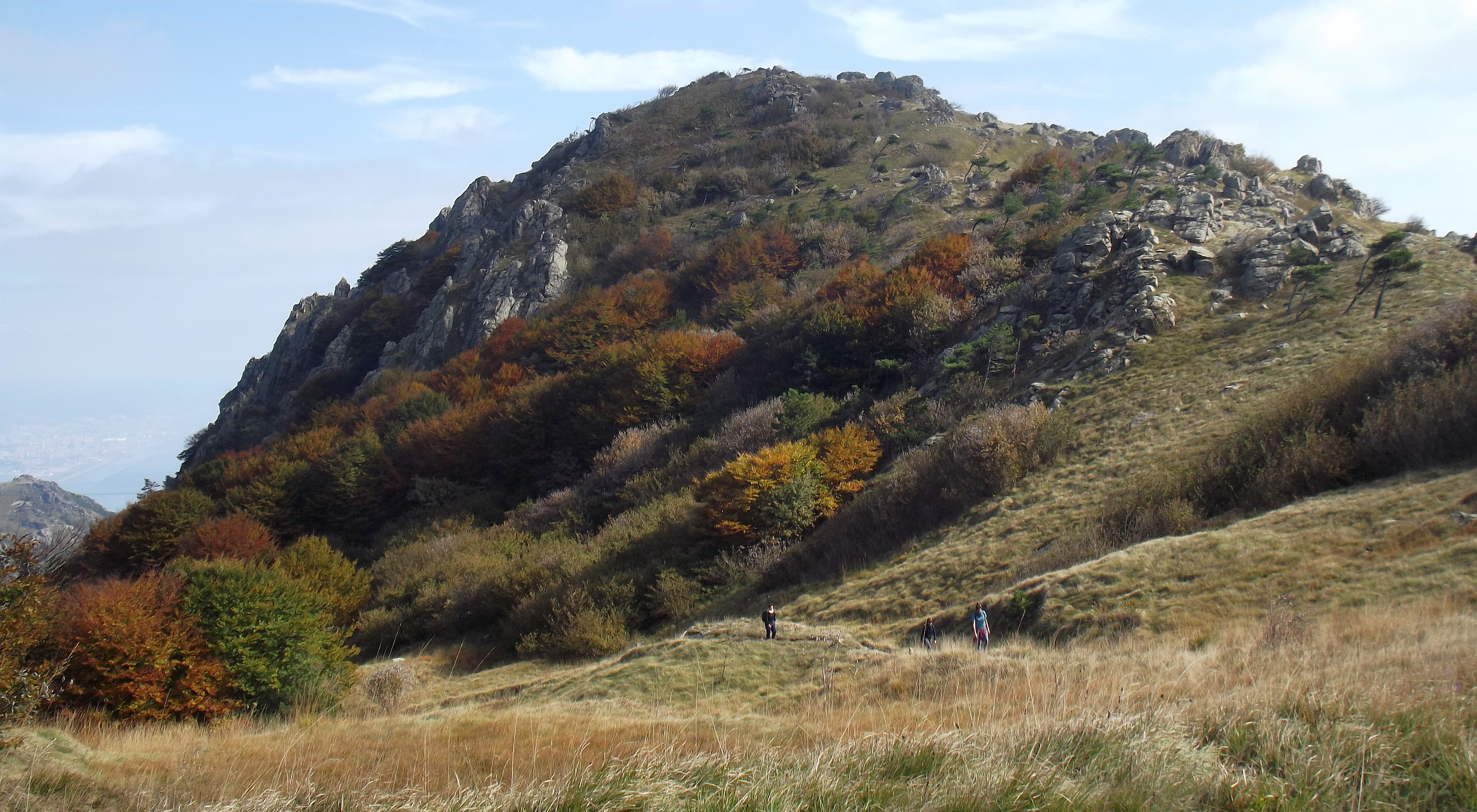
Northern slopes of Cima Fontanaccia.

Situated in the inland of the Italian Riviera between Savona and Genoa, the park covers a very interesting area of the Ligurian Apennines. its protected territory, over 87 square kilometres (34 mi^{2}), includes 26 km of the Apenninic watershed dividing Pianura Padana (tributary of the Adriatic Sea) from the Ligurian Sea drainage basin.

The park encompasses three SCIs and one SPA of the Natura 2000 network:

- Foresta della Deiva – Torrente Erro (SCI code: IT1321313) 788 hectares,
- Pian della Badia (Tiglieto) (SCI code: IT1330620) 250 hectares,
- Beigua – Monte Dente – Gargassa – Pavaglione (SCI code: IT1331402) almost 17.000 hectares,
- Beigua-Turchino (SPA code: IT1331578) 9960 hectares.

The geopark is wider than the Natural Regional Park and reaches 39,230 ha (96,900 acres) of protected territory.

=== Main summits of the park ===
Among the summits located in the park can be cited Monte Beigua (1287 m), Bric del Dente (1107 m), Cima Fontanaccia (1153 m), Monte Rama (1150 m), Monte Reixa (1183 m) and Monte Sciguello (1103 m).

=== Concerned municipalities ===
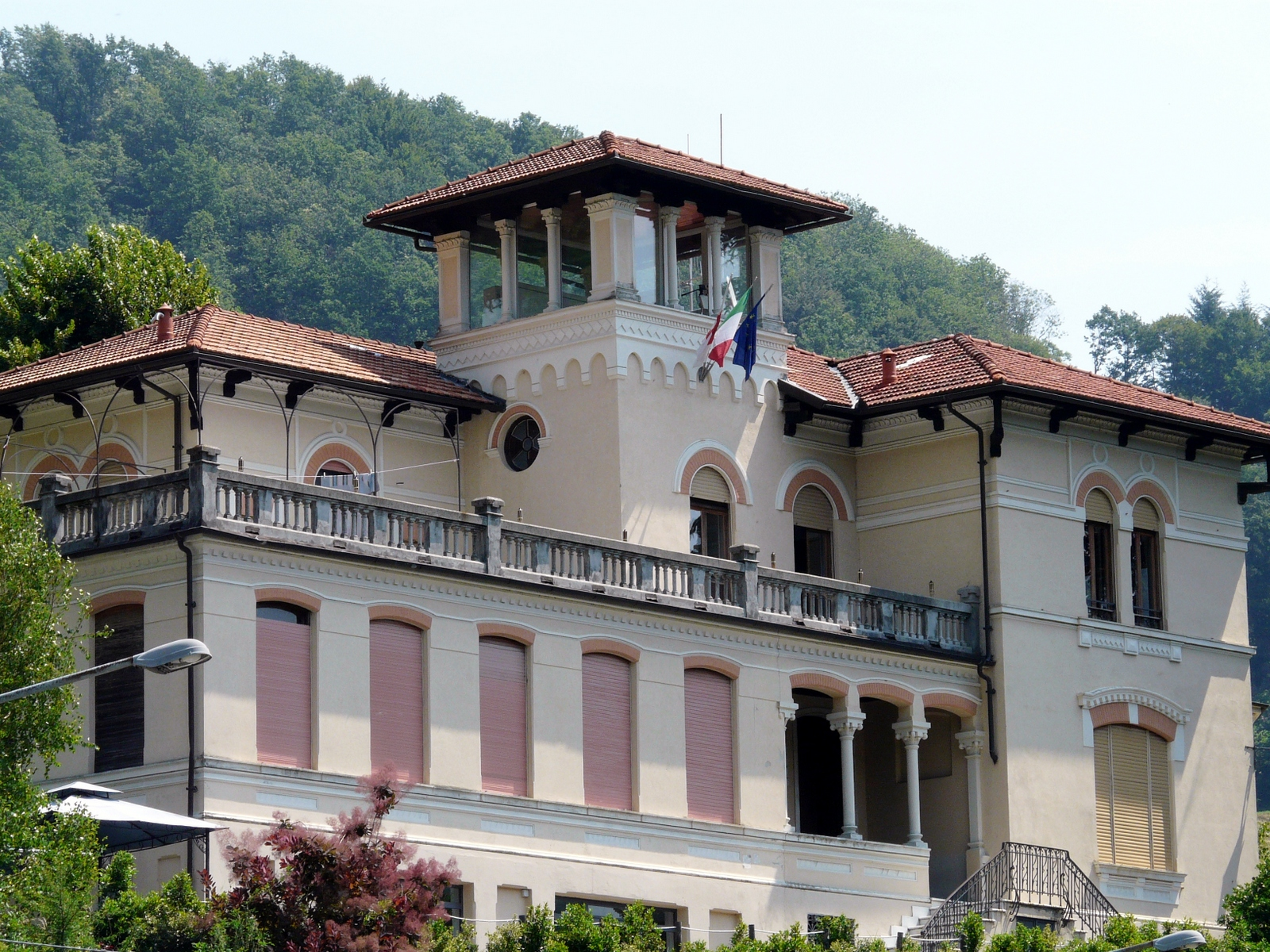
Visitor's centre located in Villa Bagnara (Masone).

The natural park is shared among the following municipalities: Arenzano, Campo Ligure, Cogoleto, Genova, Masone, Rossiglione, Sassello, Stella, Tiglieto, Varazze

== Geology ==
The park offers a wide range of geological features, most of them tied to a portion of Jurassic oceanic crust modified during the Alpine orogeny. Among the predominant rocks of the area can be cited gabbros, peridotites and serpentinites, here and there covered by pillow basalts and latter sedimentary and metamorphic layers. Several serpentinite quarries, active in the past, are now abandoned.

== Wildlife ==
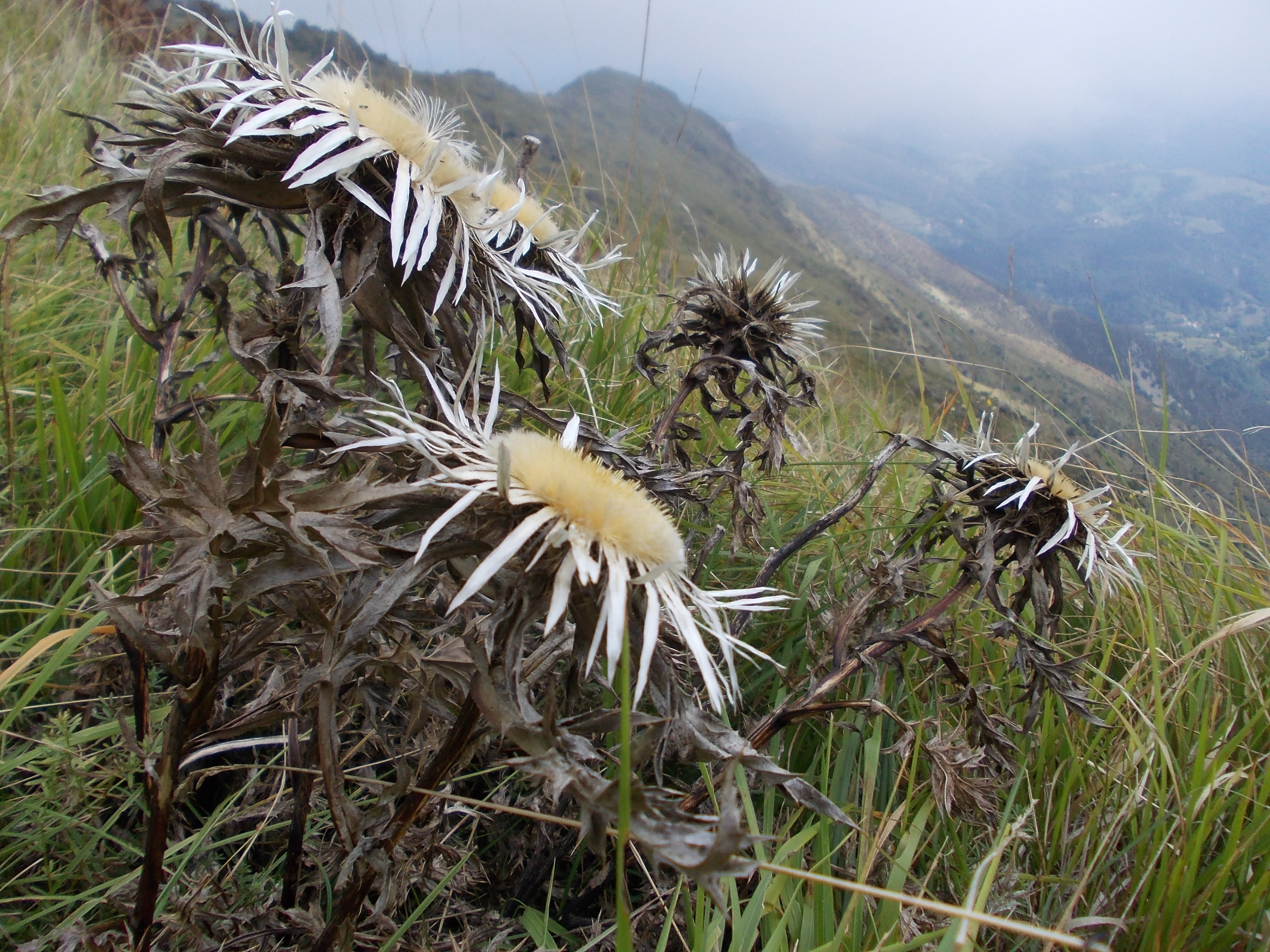
Carlina acaulis on monte Reixa.

Some rare plants of the park are Viola bertolonii, Cerastium utriense, Asplenium cuneifolium, Daphne cneorum, Cheilantes marantae. Mountain mires and wetlands host locally endangered species of amphibians as alpine newt, northern crested newt and Malpolon monspessulanus. In the park are very common larger animals as wild boars, roe and fallow deer. Common genets, a species of originally African distribution that was introduced historically in the Iberian peninsula and which has since expanded eastward through southern France and Liguria, were first sighted in the park in 2024.

== Hiking ==
Around 500 km of footpaths are available within the park, that is crossed from west to east by the Alta Via dei Monti Liguri, a long-distance trail from Ventimiglia (province of Imperia) to Bolano (province of La Spezia).

== Bibliography ==
- Claudio Capelli and Stefano Ortale (1997). Guida al parco del Beigua. SAGEP.
- Parco nazionale del Beigua Geopark (2008). Alla scoperta del Beigua geopark. SAGEP.
- Stefano Ardito (2006). Guide pratiche parchi e aree protette liguri. Parco naturale regionale Beigua. Erredi Grafiche Editoriali.

== Related articles ==
- Cascata del Serpente
- Lago dell'Antenna
