= Stura di Ovada =

Italian river

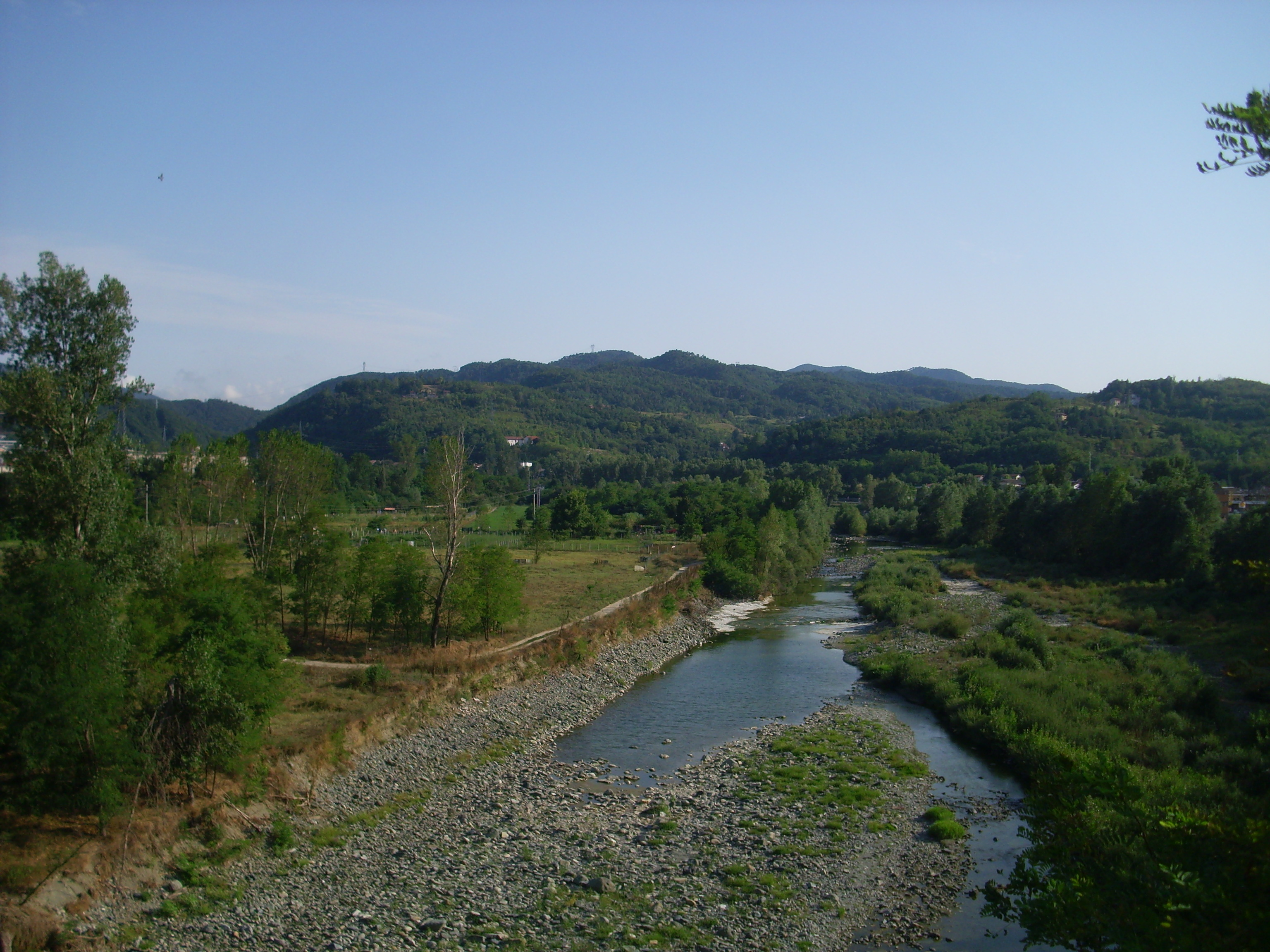

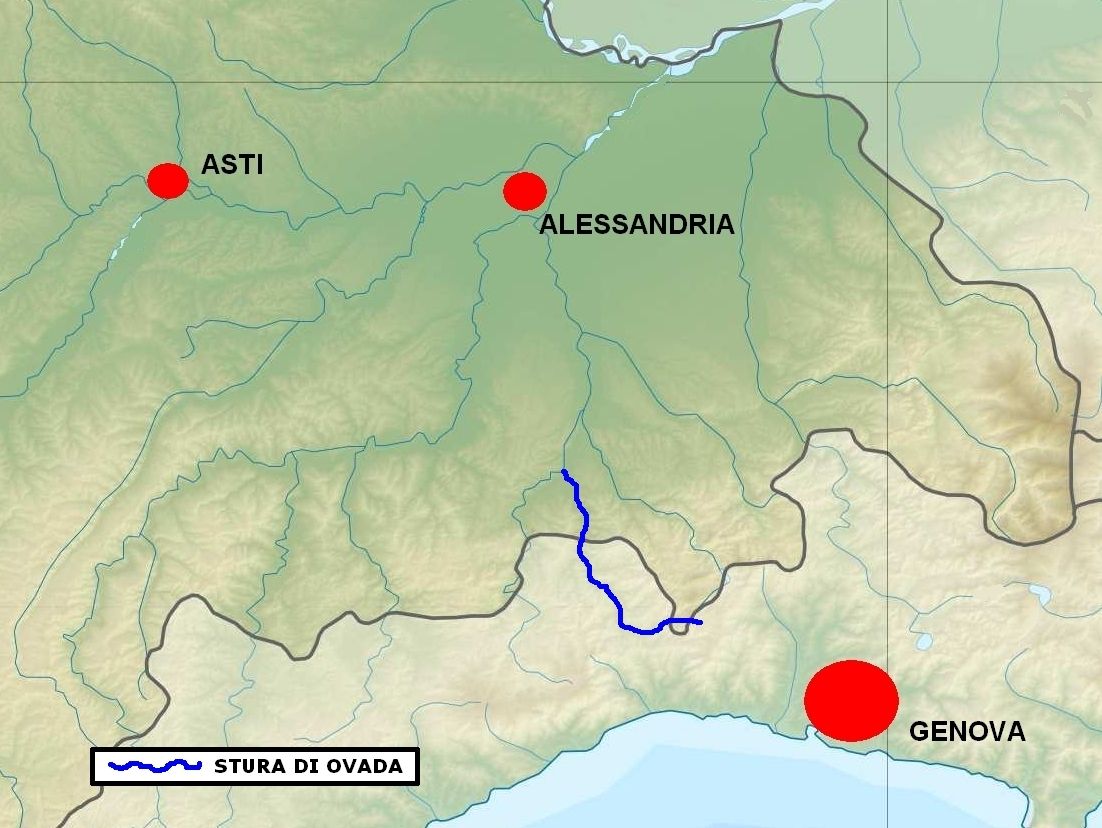

Location
- Country: Italy

Physical characteristics
- Source
  - location: Northern slopes of Monte Orditano
  - elevation: around 950 m (3,120 ft)
- Mouth
  - location: Orba near Ovada, Italy
  - coordinates: 44°38′38″N 8°38′54″E
  - elevation: 170 m (560 ft)
- Length: 32.9 km (20.4 mi)
- Basin size: 134.5 km^{2} (51.9 mi^{2})
- Discharge
  - location: Ovada
  - average: 4.3 m^{3}/s (150 cu ft/s)

Basin features
- Progression: Orba→ Bormida→ Tanaro→ Po→ Adriatic Sea

The Stura di Ovada is a 32.9-kilometre (20.4 mi) stream of Liguria and Piedmont (Italy); it is the main tributary of the Orba.

== Geography ==
The stream rises from monte Orditano (Ceranesi municipality), in the Ligurian Apennine, with the name Sturetta (little Stura). After Piani di Praglia in Mele municipality it receives Rio di Fregeu from left hand assuming the name of Stura. In this brief part of its course the Stura marks the border between the regions of Piemonte and Liguria, and the right part of its valley is encompassed in the Capanne di Marcarolo Natural Regional Park. Leaving the border it flows eastward in Liguria but, not faraway from Passo del Turchino, turns North and reaches Masone and Campo Ligure receiving from the right hand its main tributaries, Rio Vezzulla and Torrente Ponzema. Crossing Rossiglione the Stura divides the town in Rossiglione Superiore (Upper Rossigline) and Rossiglione Inferiore (Lower Rossiglione). A couple of kilometres downstream it enters Piedmont between Belforte Monferrato and Ovada. It joins the Orba near the northern border of Ovada, at around 170 m.a.s.l.

=== Main tributaries ===
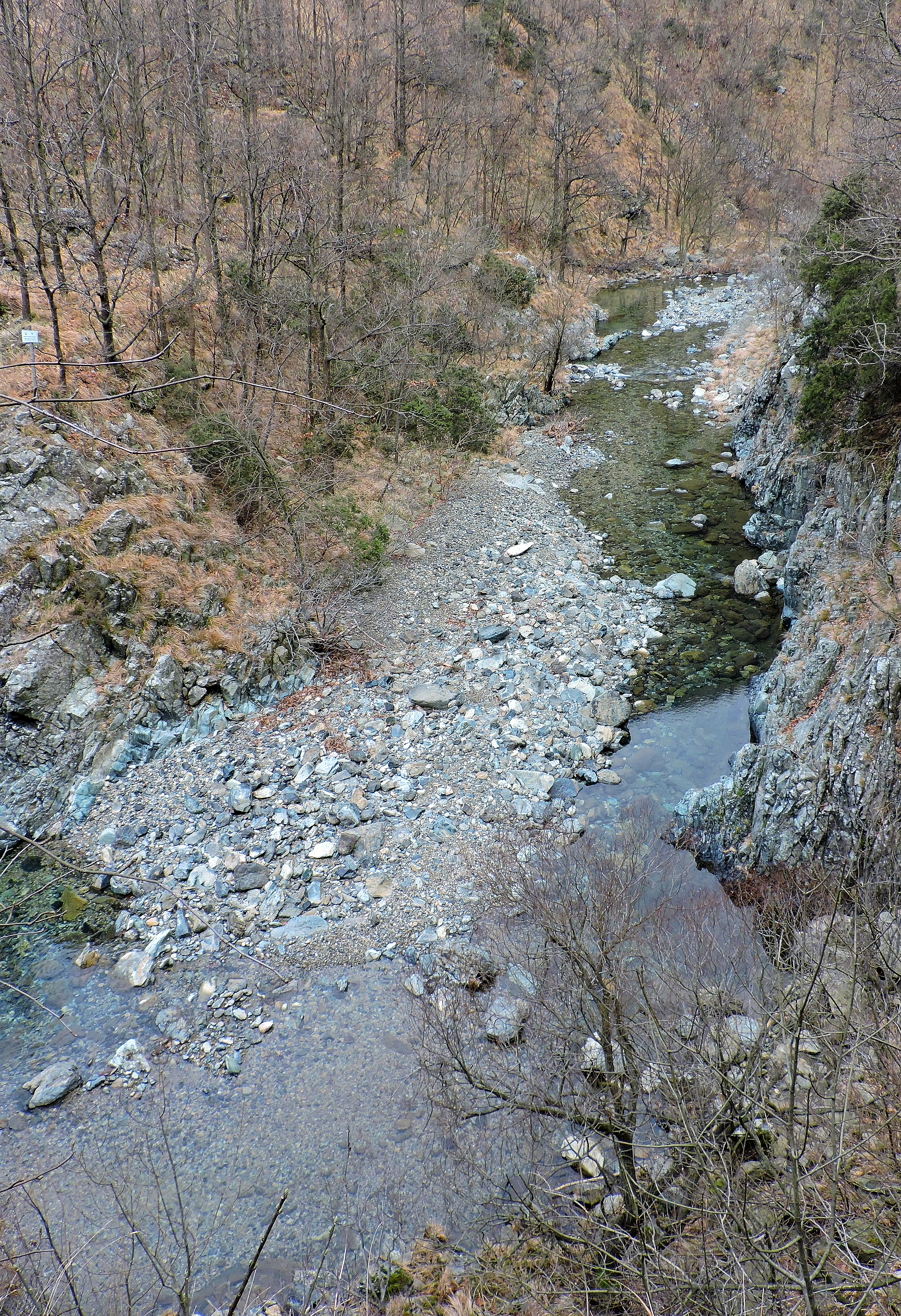
Rio Masone, a left-hand tributary of the Stura.

Stura di Ovada's main tributaries are:

- right hand:
  - rio Vezzulla (12,12 km^{2}),
  - torrente Ponzema (13,16 km^{2}),
  - rio Angassino (4,02 km^{2}),
  - rio Berlino (13,58 km^{2}),
- left hand:
  - rio Masone (8,35 km^{2}),
  - rio Masca (11,05 km^{2}),
  - rio Gargassa (16,19 km^{2}).

== Sports ==
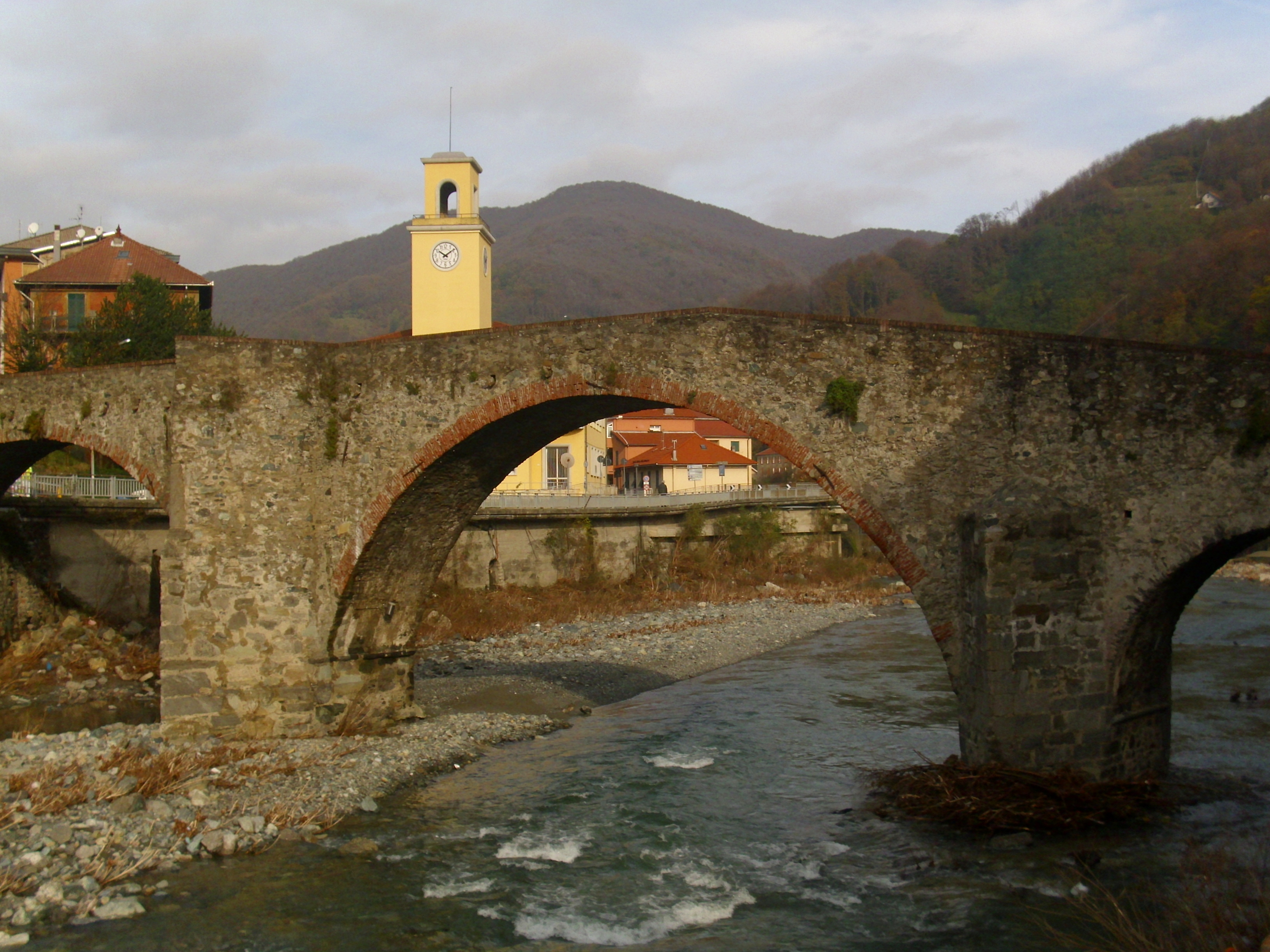
An ancient bridge in Campo Ligure.

The stream is considered suitable for angling trouts. Some parts of the Stura can be covered by canoe or kayak.

== See also ==
- Parco naturale delle Capanne di Marcarolo
- Cascata del Serpente
