= Bric del Dente =

Mountain in Italy

- Monte Dente
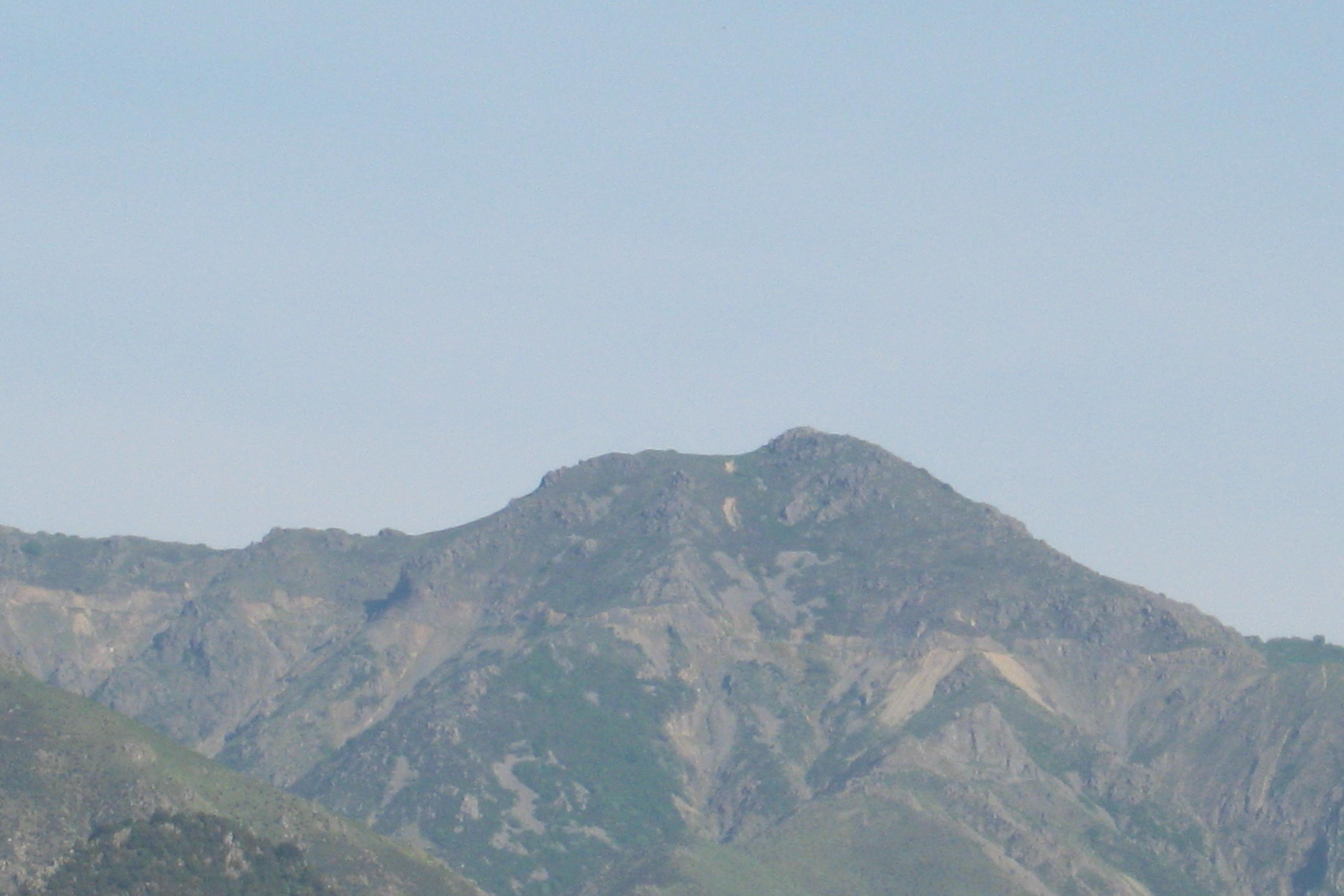

Highest point
- Elevation: 1,107 m (3,632 ft)
- Prominence: 176
- Coordinates: 44°28′55.07″N 8°40′32.76″E

Naming
- English translation: Hill of the tooth
- Language of name: Italian

Geography
- Location within Italy
- Location: Liguria, Italy
- Parent range: Ligurian Apennines

Climbing
- First ascent: ancestral
- Easiest route: hike

Bric del Dente is a 1107 metres high mountain of the Apennines located in the Italian region of Liguria.

== Etymology ==
Bric in Ligurian means hill or mountain, while dente in Italian means tooth.

== Geography ==
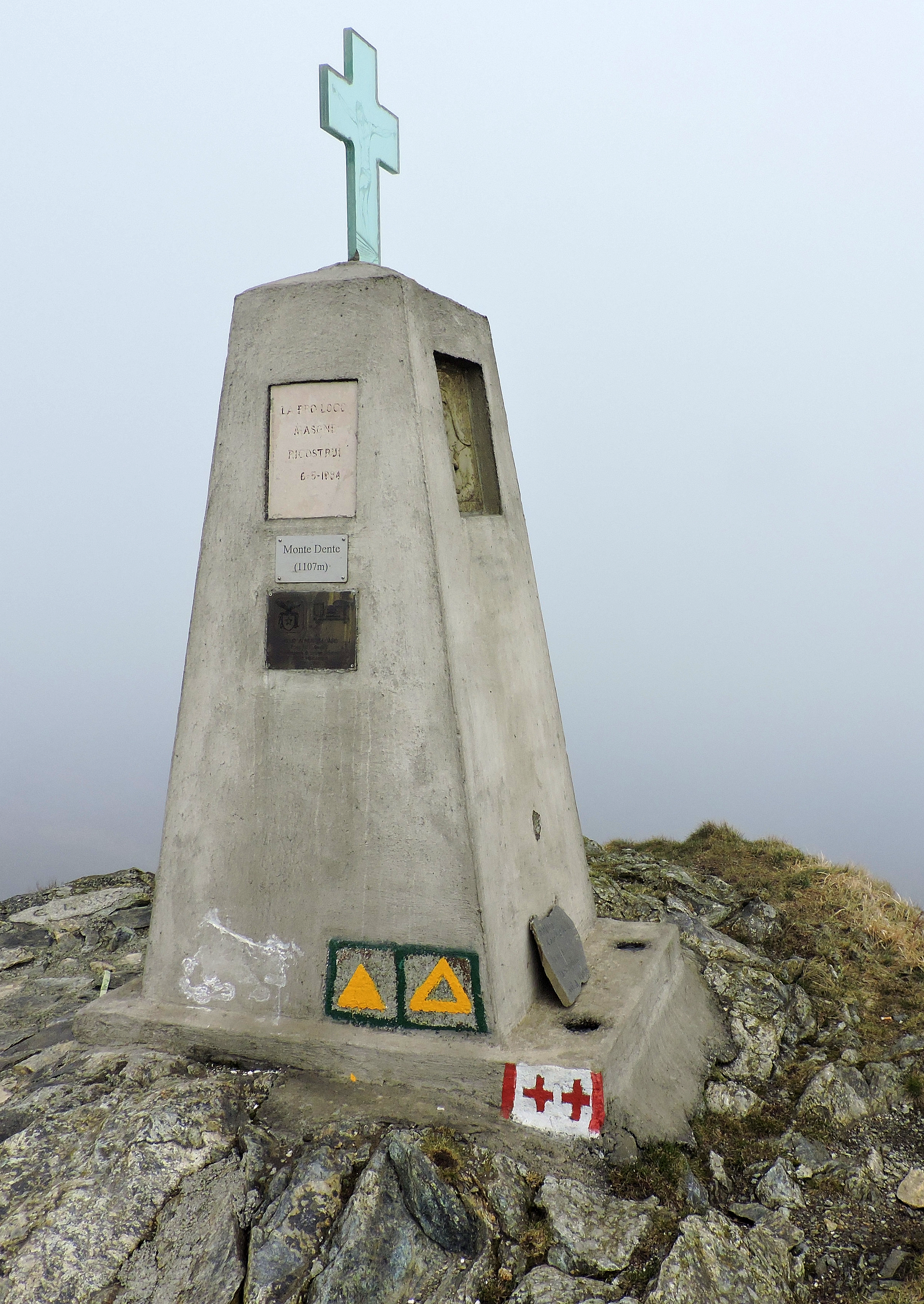
Summit pillar.

The mountain stands on the Adriatic / Ligurian drainage divide between Passo del Faiallo and Passo del Turchino. It belongs to the province of Genoa, in Liguria. Its summit is a tripoint at which the valleys of Cerusa, Orba and Stura di Ovada meet. Sella Bernè (894 m) divides Bric del Dente from the neighbouring Monte Giallo (at East, 969 m), while a saddle at 931 m divides it from Monte Reixa (westwards, 1183 m). The top of the mountain is marked by a memorial pillar overlooked by a small summit cross.

=== Environment ===
Bric del Dente sides are generally rocky and steep save the south-western one, gentler and grassier.

Since 1985 the mountain belongs to the Parco naturale regionale del Beigua.

== Access to the summit ==
The mountain is easily accessible by signposted tracks departing from Sella Bernè, Passo del Faiallo or Masone.

The Alta Via dei Monti Liguri, a long-distance trail from Ventimiglia (province of Imperia) to Bolano (province of La Spezia), passes very close to the mountain's summit.

== Mountain huts ==
- Cascina Tröa (651 m, in Masone Valley - a tributary of Stura di Ovada)
