= Monte Reixa =

Mountain in Liguria, Italy

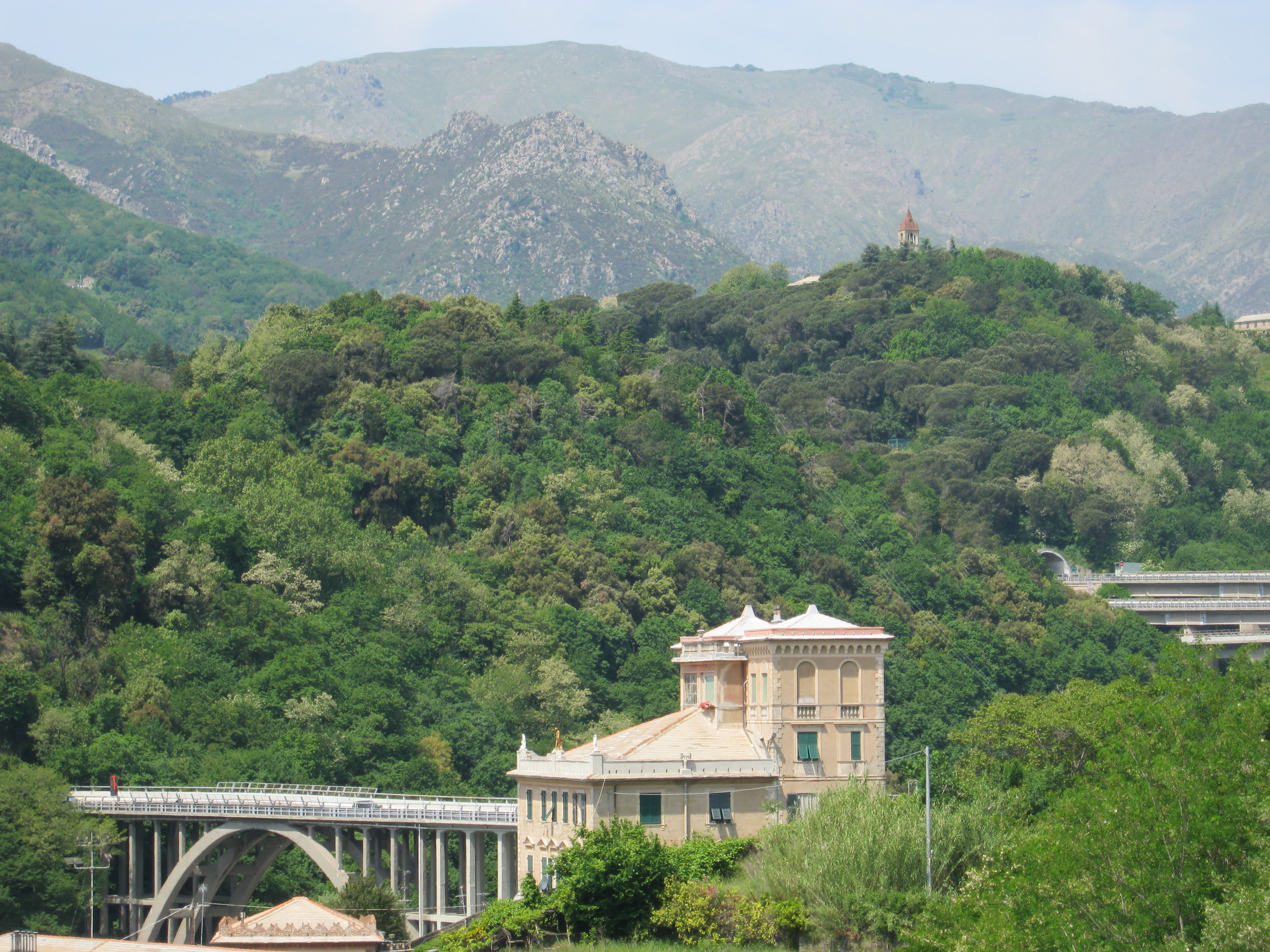
- Monte Reixa from Voltri

Highest point
- Elevation: 1,183 m (3,881 ft)
- Coordinates: 44°27′03″N 8°40′01″E

Geography
- Location within Italy
- Location: Liguria, Italy
- Parent range: Ligurian Apennines

Monte Reixa (Ligurian: [ˈmuŋte ˈɾei̯ʒa], Italian: [ˈmonte ˈrɛiza]; also Reisa in Italian) is a mountain in Liguria, northern Italy, part of the Ligurian Apennines.

== Geography ==
The mountain stands on the Adriatic / Ligurian drainage divide between Passo del Faiallo and Monte Beigua. It is located between the provinces of Genoa and Savona, in Liguria, and represents the tripoint where the municipalities of Sassello, Arenzano and Genoa meet. From its northern slopes rises the Orba, a relevant stream of Tanaro basin.

== Nature conservation ==
Monte Reixa belongs to the Parco naturale regionale del Beigua (Beigua Natural Regional Park).

== Access to the summit ==
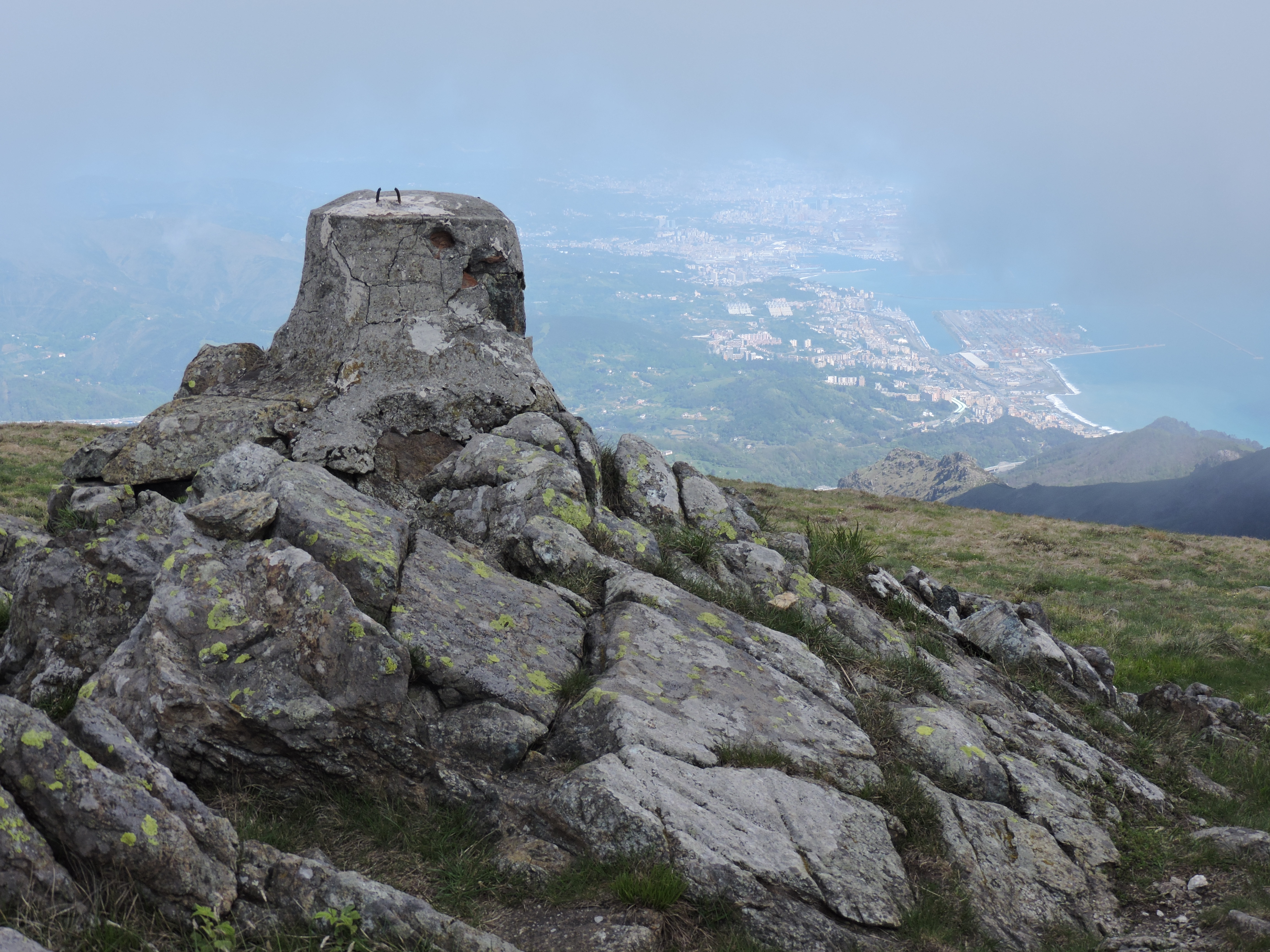
Summit pillar and, in the background, the Port of Genoa

The mountain is easily accessible by signposted traks departing from Passo del Faiallo or Voltri.

The Alta Via dei Monti Liguri, a long-distance trail from Ventimiglia (province of Imperia) to Bolano (province of La Spezia), passes very close to the mountain's summit.
