= Lago di Ortiglieto =

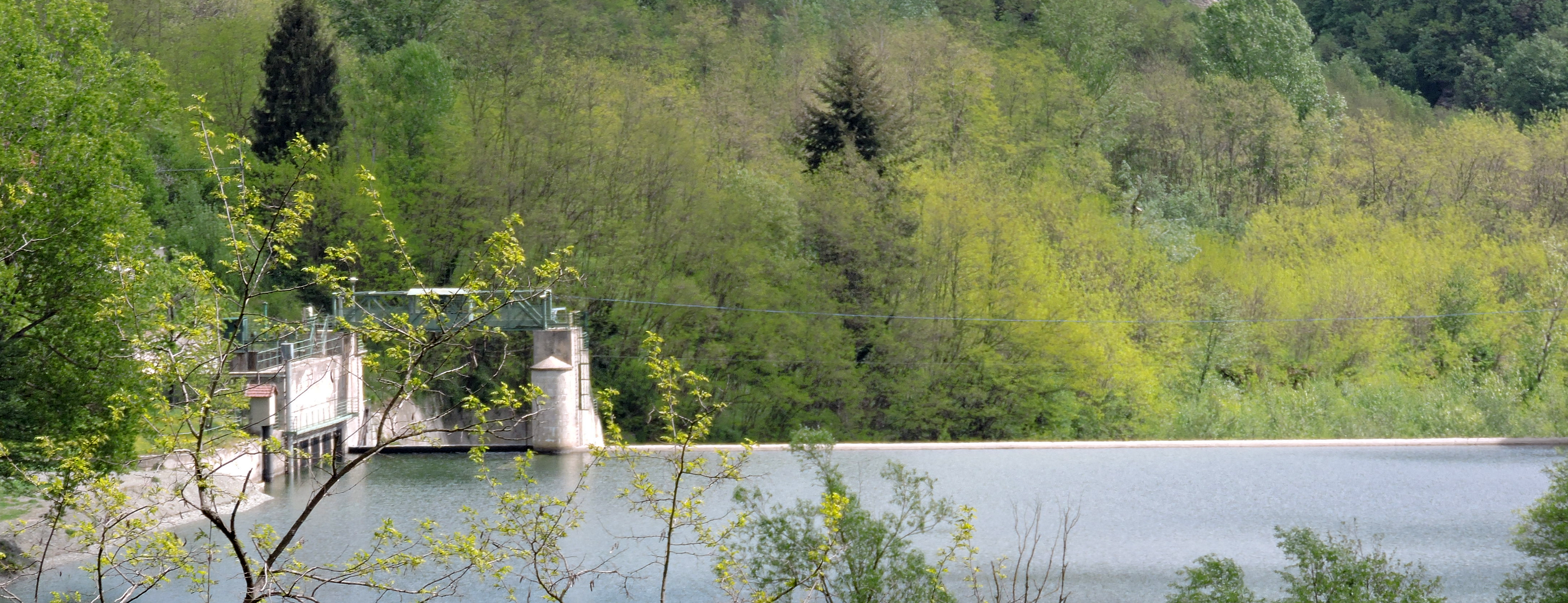

- Location within Italy
- Location: Province of Genova, Province of Alessandria, Liguria, Piemonte
- Coordinates: 44°34′09″N 8°36′14″E
- Type: artificial lake
- Primary inflows: Orba
- Primary outflows: Orba
- Basin countries: Italy
- Built: 1917 – 1925
- Surface elevation: 296.4 m (972 ft)

Lago di Ortiglieto is a reservoir in northwest Italy which straddles the Metropolitan City of Genoa in Liguria, and the Province of Alessandria in Piedmont.

== History ==
Lago di Ortiglieto reservoir was firstly designed in 1906 by ing. Zunini and was built from 1917 to 1925 by a company of Genoa named Officine Elettriche Genovesi. There were two dams, the higher of 45 metres (bric Zerbino dam) and another one of 15 metres (Diga della Sella Zerbino). After a period of heavy rains of August 1935 the sella Zerbino dam crashed, generating a flood of the Orba which caused 111 dathts, mainly in the Ovada area. Nowadays Ortiglieto lake is much smaller than in the past and there is only one dam.
