= Cascata del Serpente =

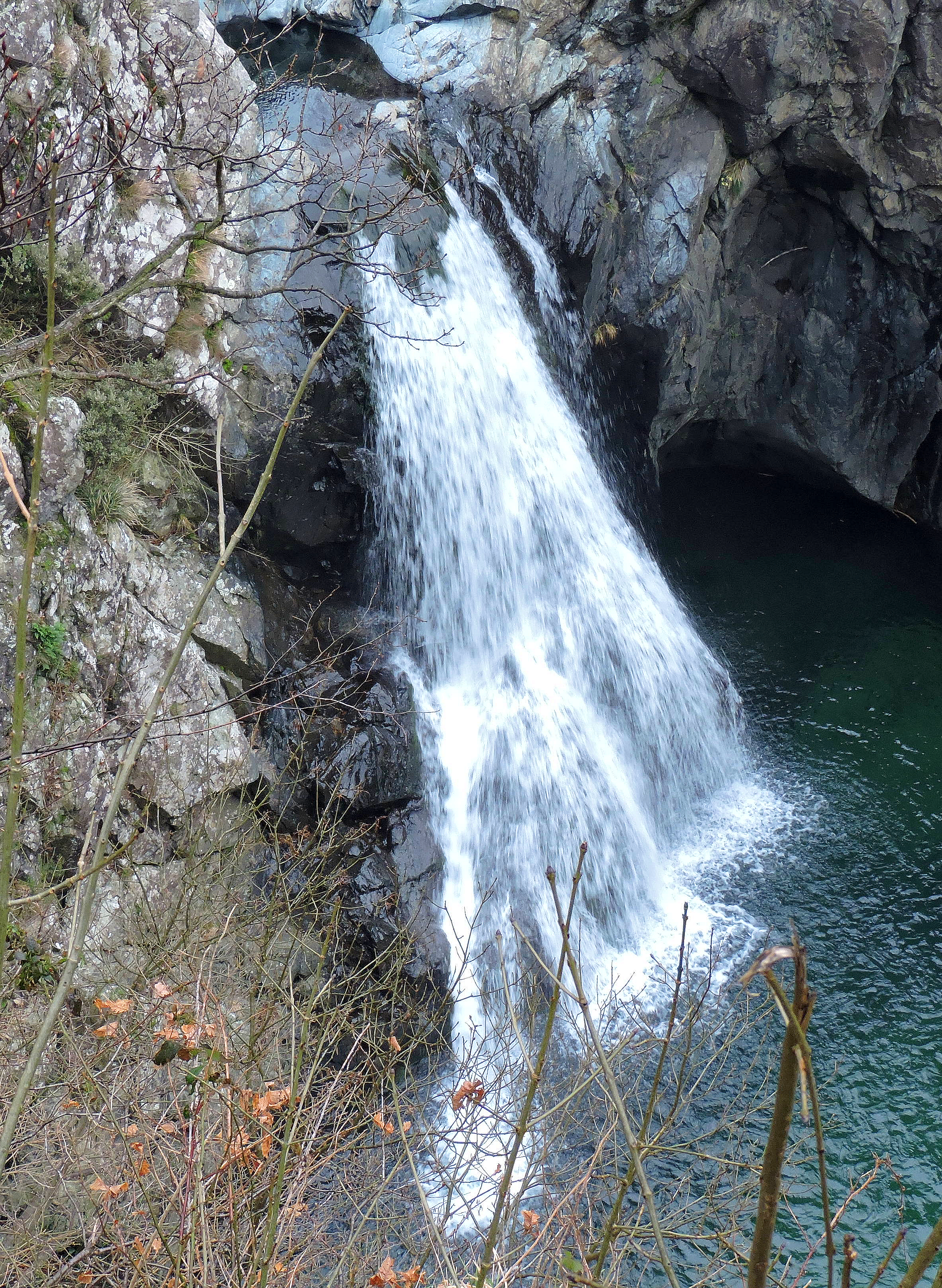
- Upper view

- Location within Italy
- Location: Masone, Liguria, Italy
- Coordinates: 44°29′52.44″N 08°42′06.53″E
- Number of drops: 5
- Longest drop: 12 m (39 ft)
- Watercourse: torrente Masone

Cascata del Serpente (in English Snake's waterfall) is a waterfall located in the Ligurian Apennine (Italy). In the past it was also named Cascata delle Cheucie. With other secondary drops it forms the cascate del Serpente complex.

== Geography ==
The waterfalls are located in the rugged and step valley of torrente Masone, a left-hand tributary of the Stura di Ovada. The waterfall is not formed by a discontinuity in the stream bedrock, but by a diverse grade of breaking of the same type of rock, the greenschists prevailing in the small valley. This different grade of fracturation produced the step from which the water jumps in the underlying lake, leaping over a less fractured (and thus less erodible) rock layer.

The site is considered one sito di interesse geomorfolgico (site of geomorphological interest) of the Parco naturale regionale del Beigua. The Park administration created close to the waterfalls a Percorso botanico (botanical itinerary) in co-operation with a local secondary school.

In summer the small lake underlying the main drop is a popular bathing place.

== History ==
In the past the waterfall was named Cascata delle Cheucie, and only the small lake was referred as del Serpente (of the snake).

... stands Cheucie waterfall, an horrid and pictoresque cascade falling in a small lake named "Lago del Serpente".

— Collection of Club Alpino Italiano monthly magazine, year 1915

The abundant waters of torrente Masone were used for many purposes and is still possible to recognize ruins of a big mill located near the junction of torrente Masone and the Stura. Closer to the waterfalls are located remains of Cartiera Savoi, an ancient paper mill moved by freshwater.

== Hiking and canyoning ==
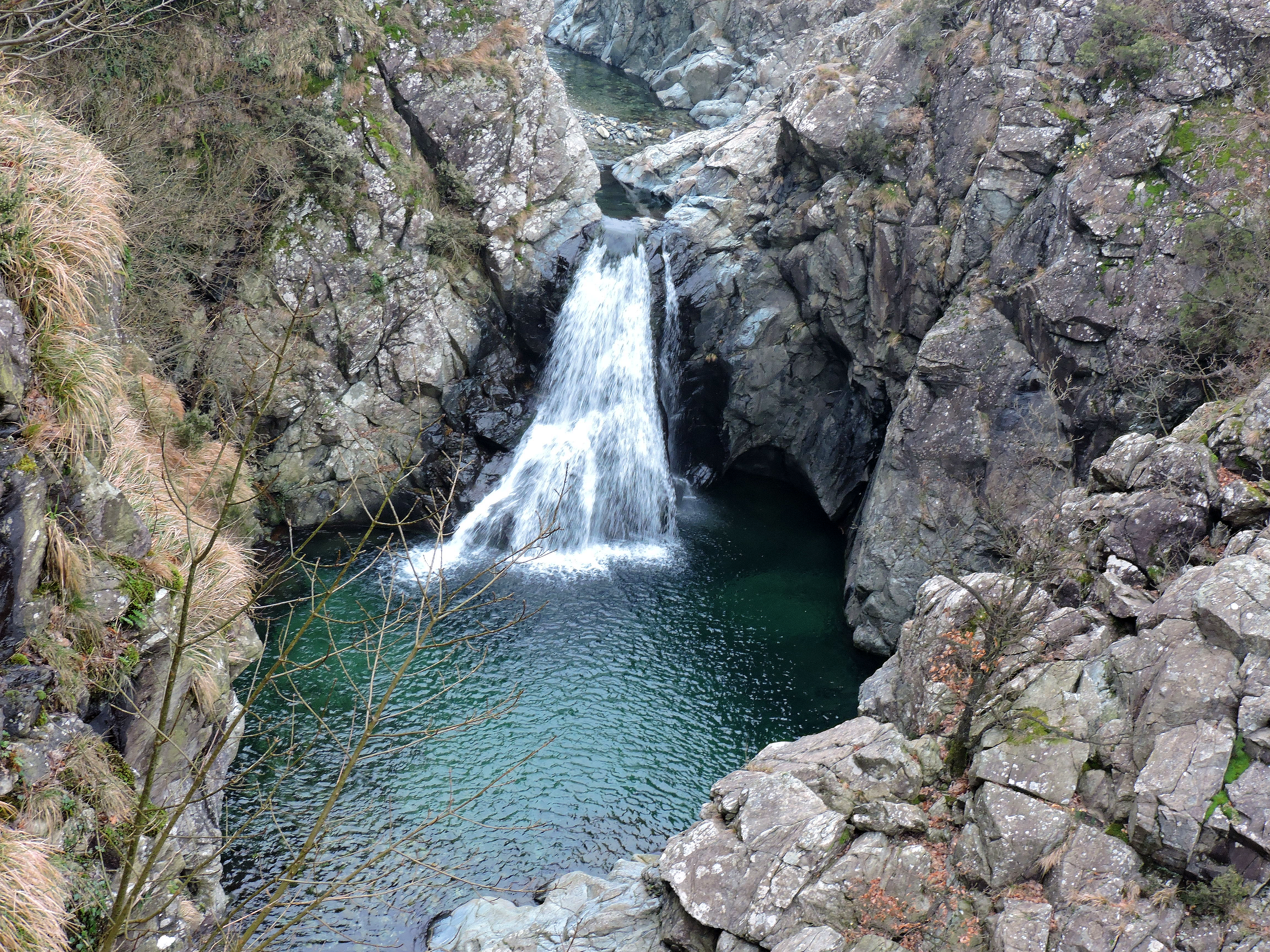
Waterfall and lake

The waterfalls can be easily reached from Masone centre by car or with a 30 minutes walk. A footpath links the waterfall with Bric del Dente and the Po/Ligurian Sea water divide.

A canyoning itinerary partially equipped as via ferrata flanks the main drop as well as the minor ones.

== Notes ==
- Media related to Cascata del Serpente at Wikimedia Commons
