= Orba (river) =

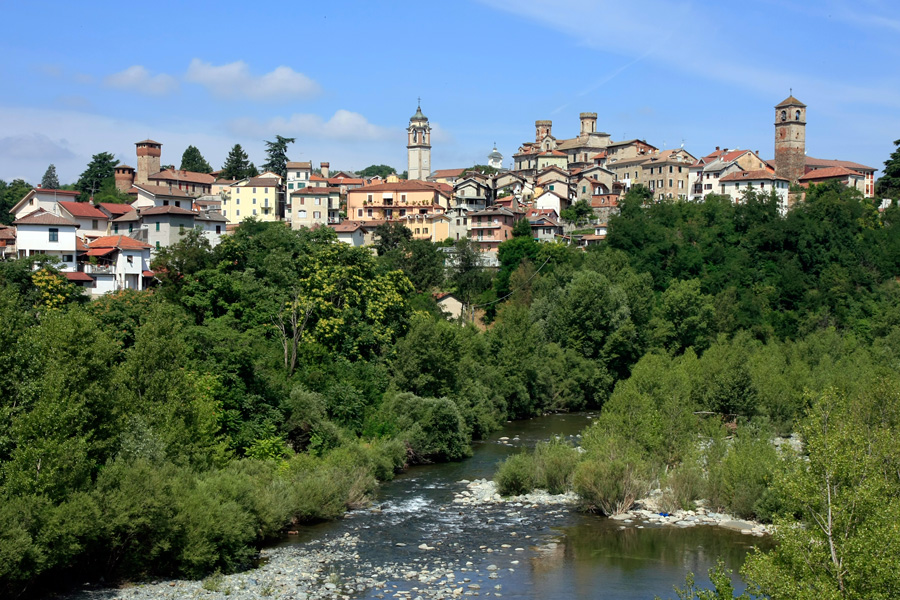
- The Orba near Molare

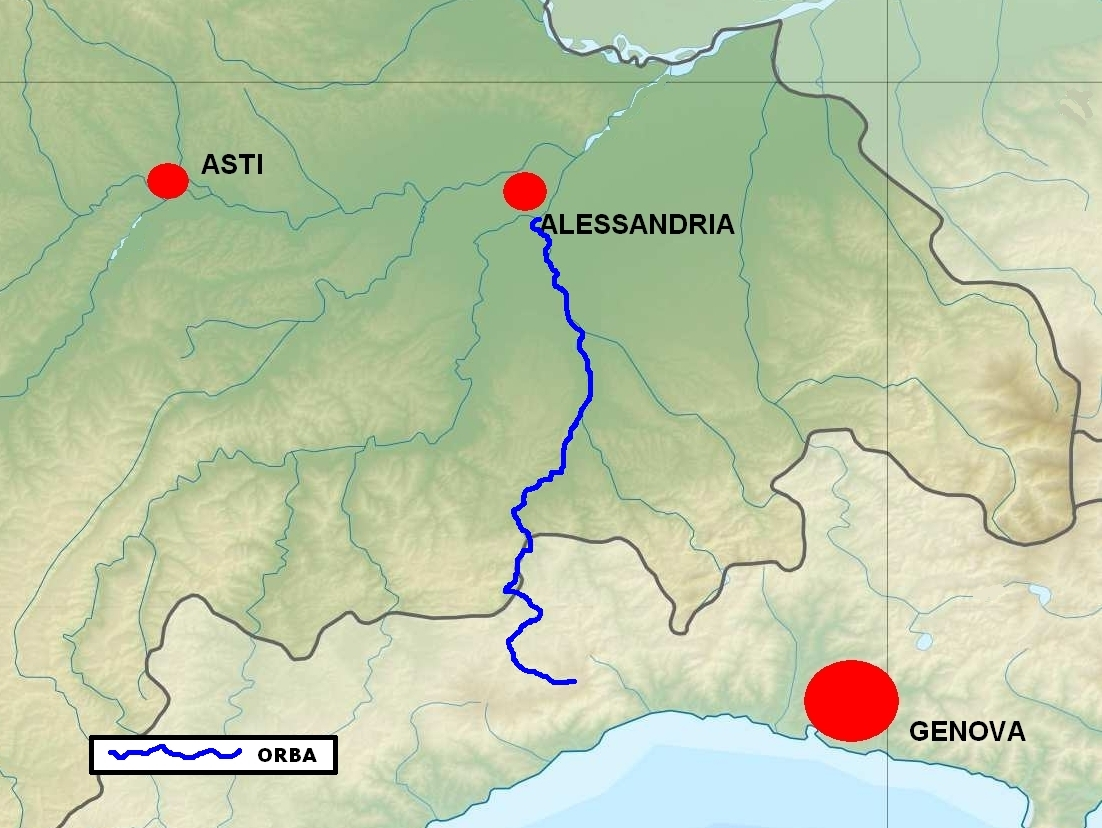

Location
- Country: Italy

Physical characteristics
- Source
  - location: Monte Reixa
  - elevation: 1,183 m (3,881 ft)
- Mouth: Bormida
  - coordinates: 44.8724°N 8.6169°E
- Length: 68.4 km (42.5 mi)
- Basin size: 776.4 km^{2} (299.8 mi^{2})
- Discharge
  - average: 15.1 m^{3}/s (530 cu ft/s)

Basin features
- Progression: Bormida→ Tanaro→ Po→ Adriatic Sea
- Tributaries
  - right: Stura di Ovada, Piota, Lemme

The Orba is a torrent (Italian: torrente — a stream whose flow shows a very marked seasonal variation) of northern Italy.

== Toponymy ==
Orba is a toponym which is quite frequent in Europe, especially in Italy, France and Spain in a variety of different forms and spelling.

The name has a Celtic origin related with Celtic mythology and as toponym is often associated with rivers whose sands were found to be rich in gold.

== Geography ==
The Orba's approximately 70 km (43 mi) course runs northwards through Piedmont from its springs in the Apennines (from the northern slopes of Monte Reixa) to its confluence with the Bormida, a right tributary of the Po. The Orba flows from a mountain region, where there are attractive villages such as Tiglieto, Molare and then it comes to Monferrato's hills.

Ovada is the biggest town in Orba's valley, and it has a central role among all other villages on top of hills: Rocca Grimalda, Tagliolo Monferrato, Cremolino, Silvano d'Orba, Carpeneto, Castelletto d'Orba, Predosa are only some of villages which were built around their own castles on top of rocky hills close to the river, surrounded by vineyard and woods.

Wines produced in this valley include: Dolcetto di Ovada, Barbera del Monferrato, Cortese di Gavi.

== Main tributaries ==
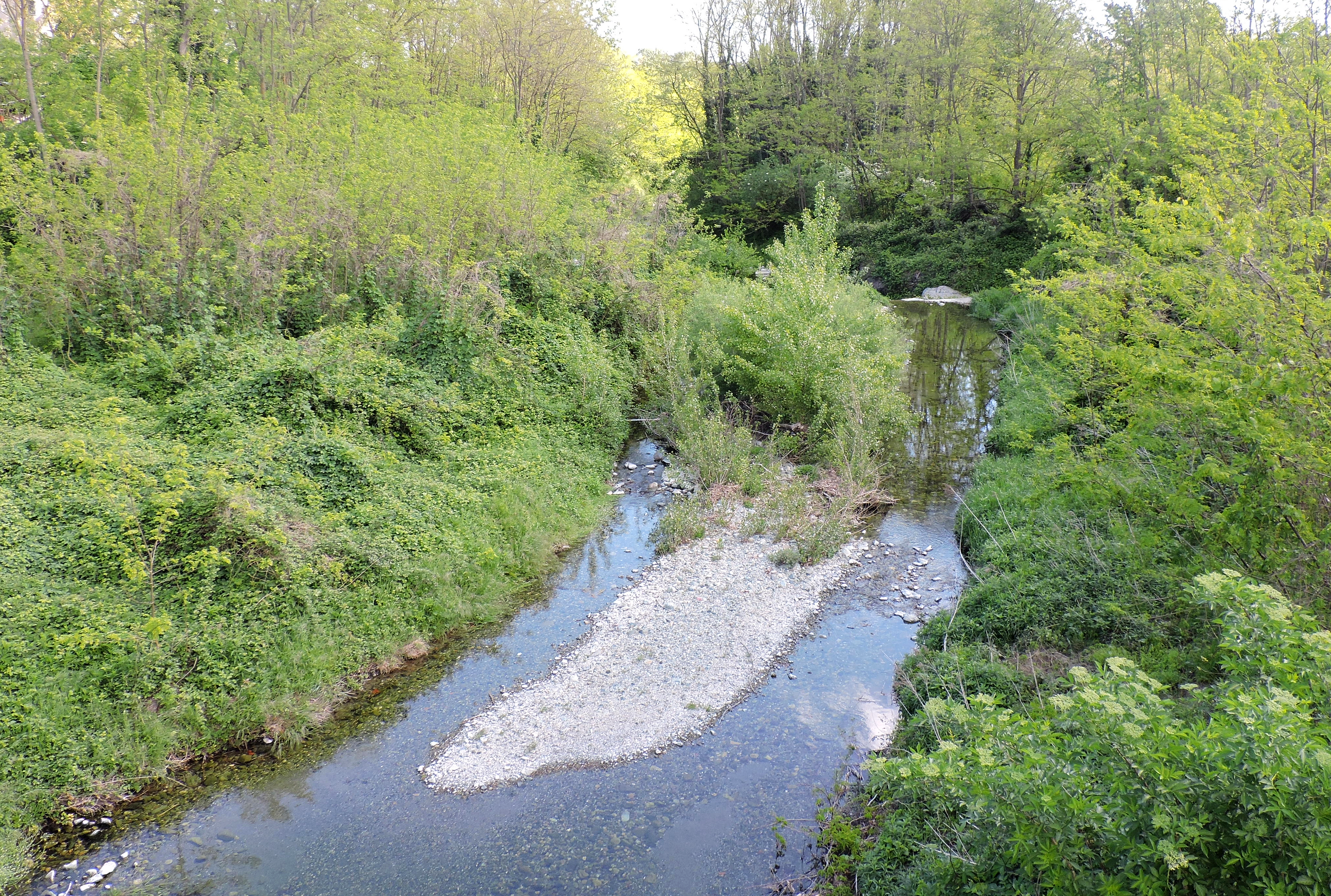
Torrente Ammione, a right-hand tributary of the Orba

- Right Bank:
  - Carpescio,
  - Stura di Ovada,
  - Piota,
  - Albedosa,
  - Lemme.
- Left Bank:
  - Orbarina,
  - Olbicella,
  - rio Meri,
  - Amione.

== History ==
Gold was extracted from Orba's sand long before the Romans founded a town in this forested area. Rondinaria is supposed to have been an important centre for gold extraction until the end of the Western Roman Empire: during the following centuries almost all traces of this old centre disappeared and the valley was again completely covered by forests. From 1700, many and expensive efforts were done in order to find out the gold field where the precious metal came from but nobody managed to detect it.

Gold extraction from sand grew up during the Fascist period, as answer to the embargo imposed by other nations on Italian gold trade. Today this activity turned into a local popular hobby and a museum of gold extraction was founded in Predosa, with collections of relics from the past of this old and glorious activity.

A reservoir named Lago di Ortiglieto built from 1917 to 1925 on the Orba collapsed after a period of heavy rains in August 1935, causing 111 deaths, mainly in the Ovada area.

== See also ==
- Lago dell'Antenna
