= Molare =

- Comune
- Comune di Molare
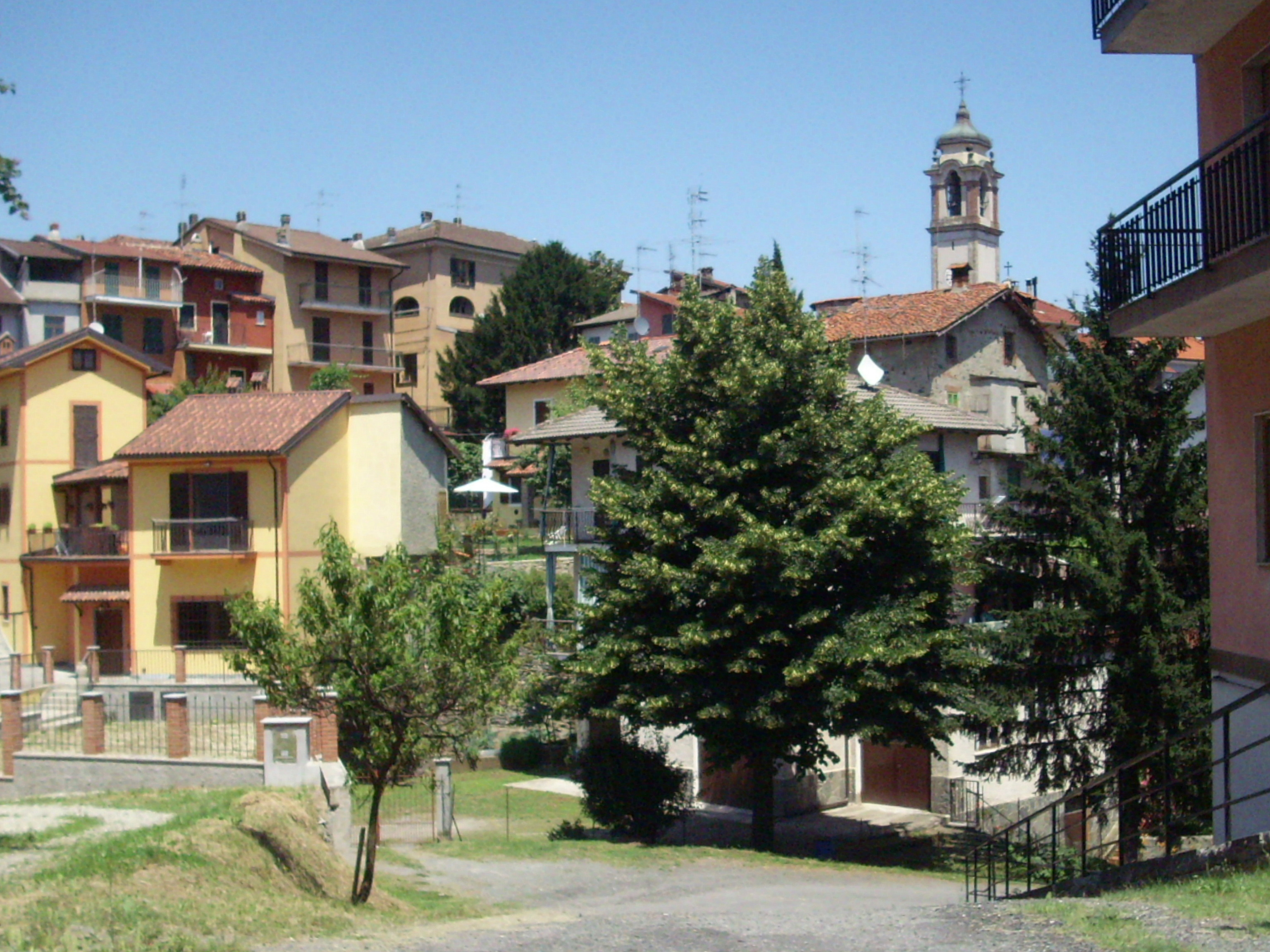

- Location within Italy Location within Piedmont
- Coordinates: 44°37′N 8°36′E
- Country: Italy
- Region: Piedmont
- Province: Alessandria (AL)

Government
  - Mayor: Andrea Barisone

Area
  - Total: 32.8 km^{2} (12.7 sq mi)

Population (31 December 2010)
  - Total: 2,255
  - Density: 68.8/km^{2} (178/sq mi)
- Time zone: UTC+1 (CET)
  - Summer (DST): UTC+2 (CEST)
- Postal code: 15074
- Dialing code: 0143

Molare is a comune (municipality) in the Province of Alessandria in the Italian region Piedmont, located about 90 kilometres (56 mi) southeast of Turin and about 35 kilometres (22 mi) south of Alessandria.

Molare borders the following municipalities: Cassinelle, Cremolino, Ovada, Ponzone, Rossiglione, and Tiglieto.

== Demographic evolution ==
Historical population

Year	Pop.	±%
1861	2,143	—
1871	2,370	+10.6%
1881	2,623	+10.7%
1901	3,096	+18.0%
1911	2,703	−12.7%

Year	Pop.	±%
1921	2,445	−9.5%
1931	2,439	−0.2%
1936	2,296	−5.9%
1951	2,147	−6.5%
1961	1,808	−15.8%

Year	Pop.	±%
1971	1,580	−12.6%
1981	1,799	+13.9%
1991	2,034	+13.1%
2001	2,044	+0.5%

Source: Data from ISTAT
