= Campo Ligure =

- Comune
- Comune di Campo Ligure
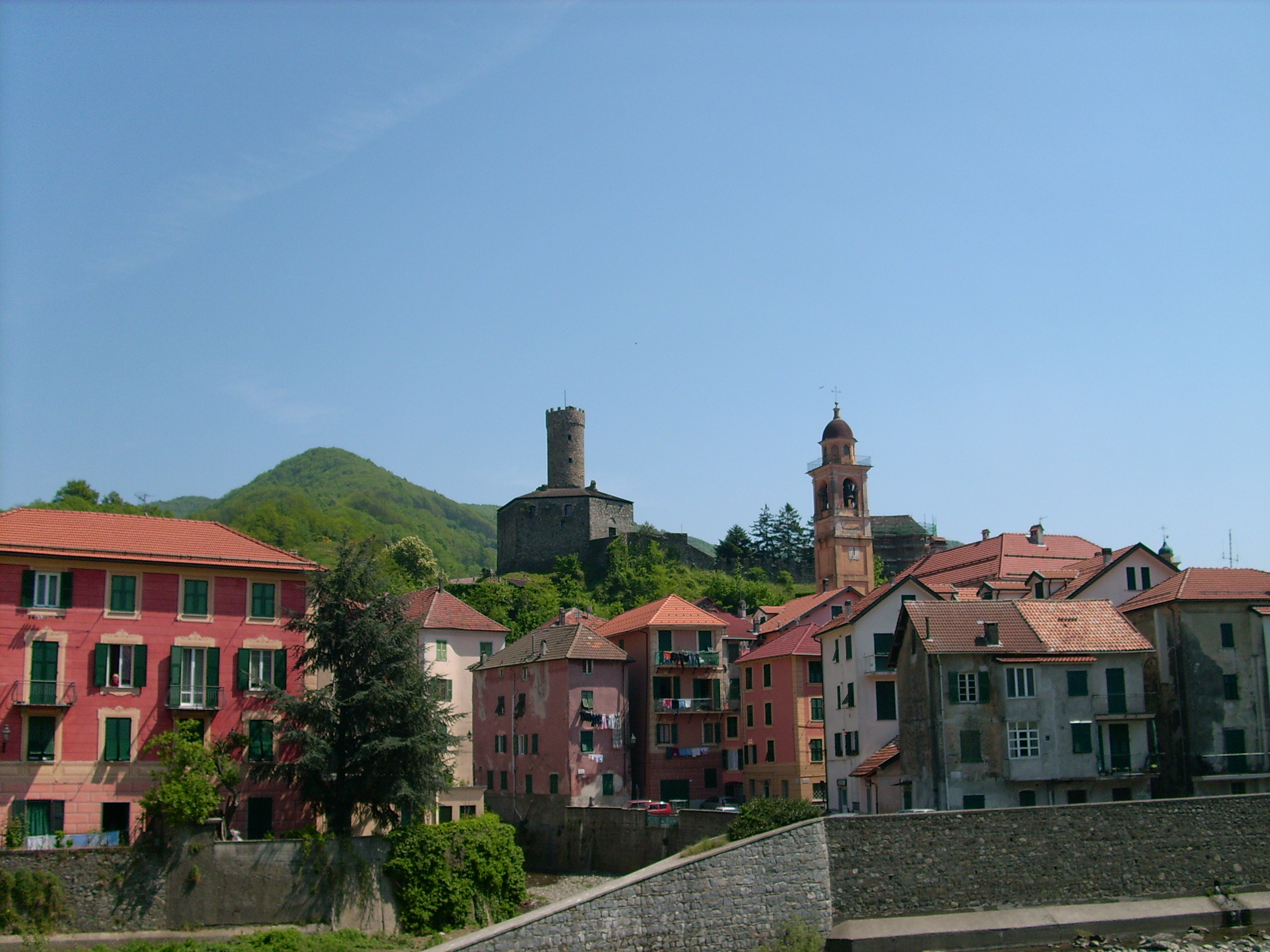

- Flag Coat of arms

- Location within Italy Location within Liguria
- Coordinates: 44°32′N 8°42′E
- Country: Italy
- Region: Liguria
- Metropolitan city: Genoa (GE)

Government
  - Mayor: Giovanni Oliveri

Area
  - Total: 23.8 km^{2} (9.2 sq mi)
- Elevation: 342 m (1,122 ft)

Population (30 April 2017)
  - Total: 2,924
  - Density: 123/km^{2} (318/sq mi)
- Demonym: Campesi
- Time zone: UTC+1 (CET)
  - Summer (DST): UTC+2 (CEST)
- Postal code: 16013
- Dialing code: 010
- Patron saint: St. Mary Magdalene
- Saint day: July 22
- Website: Official website

Campo Ligure (locally Campo) is a comune (municipality) in the Metropolitan City of Genoa in the Italian region Liguria, located about 37 kilometres (23 mi) northwest of Genoa.

Campo Ligure borders the following municipalities: Bosio, Masone, Rossiglione, Tiglieto. It is one of I Borghi più belli d'Italia ("The most beautiful villages of Italy").

== Geography ==
It is located in the center of the intersection of the rivers Stura, Angassino and Ponzema, 25 kilometres (16 mi) from Genoa, and part of its territory to the west is within the boundaries of the Parco naturale regionale del Beigua, while in the east borders the Parco delle Capanne di Marcarolo.

== History ==
The place name refers to a 3rd-century AD Roman fortified settlement built during the reign of Emperor Aurelian, reinforced by the Byzantines in the 6th century. The first parish, San Michele, is probably dating back to the 10th century. Between the 12th and 13th century various families led the administration of Campo, until the year 1329, when it becomes a small fief within the Holy Roman Empire, surrounded by the territory of the Republic of Genoa.

In July 1600 the Republic of Genoa increased control of the small enclave, banishing any local opposition to its rule. In the 18th century the town saw a gradual buildup of manufacturing activities (iron production and processing, silk spinning mills, paper mills, lime pits, forestry and agriculture), as well as the birth of the republican municipality, which joined the Ligurian Republic in 1797.

In 1805 the town, then called Campo Freddo, was included in the French Empire of Napoleon I; after the 1815 Congress of Vienna it became part of the Kingdom of Sardinia.

In 1884 the village's name was changed from Campo Freddo (derived from “feudo” -fief- or possibly the German word “frei” -free- ) to Campo Ligure. That year also saw the opening of the first goldsmith shop dedicated to filigree.

== Economy ==
The country's economic activity is mainly connected to the processing of filigrana and crafts and the textile industry and mechanical engineering.

The filigrana (filigree) is very fine gold and silver threads, hand crafted using simple pliers (the “bruscelle”) and a welding torch: filigree is the centerpiece of typical Campo Ligure craft. The first shop was opened in 1884; then in a short span of time the town became the national center for this precious artistic production.

== Twin towns ==
Campo Ligure is twinned with:

- Corbelin, France (2010)

== Events ==
- "Festa patronale di santa Maria Maddalena" on the Sunday following July 22
- "Mostra della filigrana", in months August e September

== Main sights ==
- Castle, built by the Spinola family of Genoa since 1309
- Palazzo Spinola. Built in the 14th century, it was enlarged in 1693
- Medieval bridge on the Stura river. The original structure dated to the 9th century, but it was rebuilt several times starting from the 18th century.
- Oratory of Nostra Signora Assunta, in Baroque style
- Parish church (18th century), in Baroque style
- Giardino Botanico Montano di Pratorondanino
- Monte Pracaban
