= Varazze =

- Comune
- Comune di Varazze
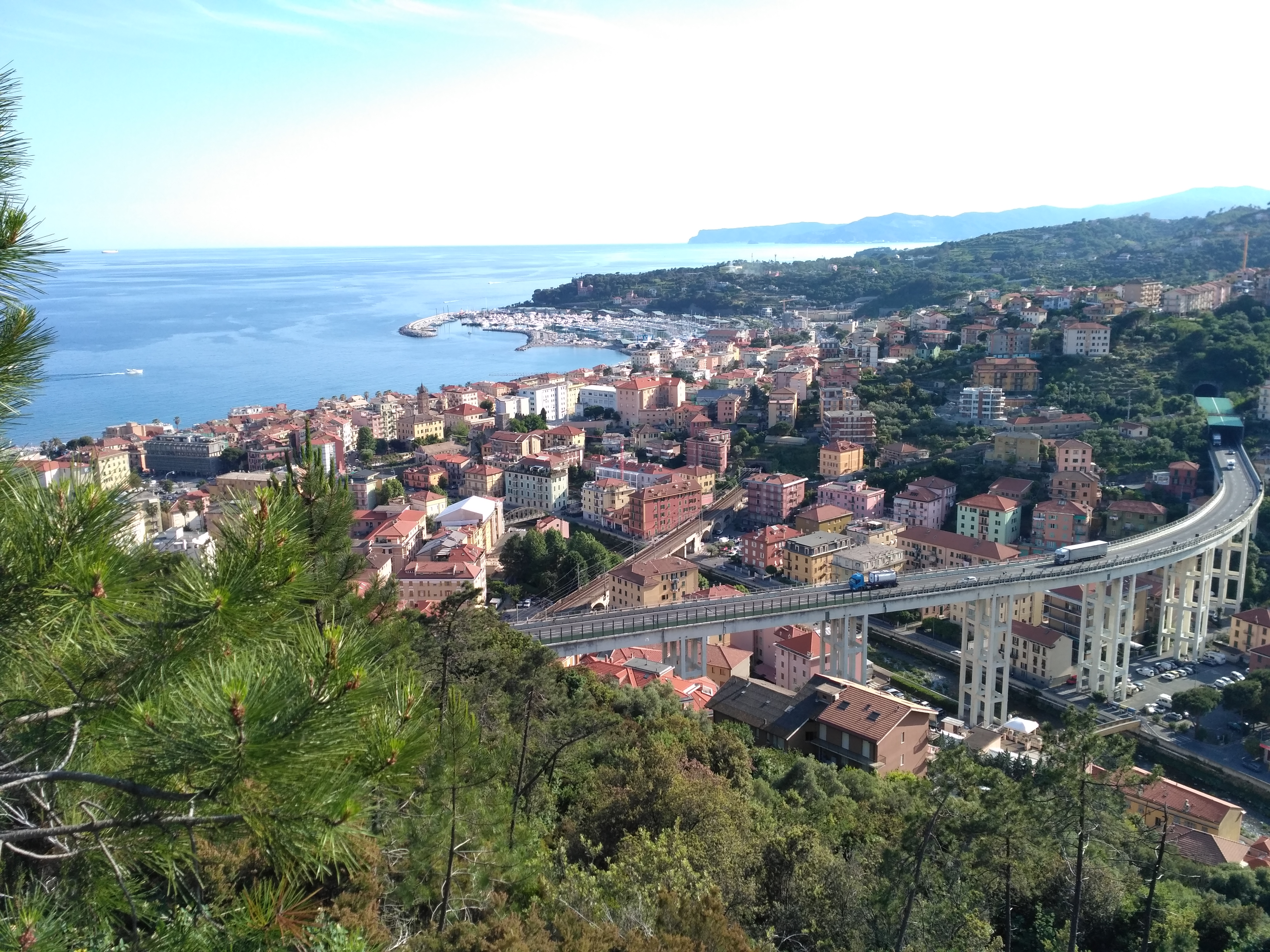

- Flag Coat of arms

- Location within Italy Location within Liguria
- Coordinates: 44°22′N 8°35′E
- Country: Italy
- Region: Liguria
- Province: Savona (SV)
- Frazioni: Alpicella, Cantalupo, Casanova, Castagnabuona, Deserto, Faje, Invrea, Pero

Government
  - Mayor: Giovanni Delfino (The People of Freedom - Northern League)

Area
  - Total: 48.0 km^{2} (18.5 sq mi)
- Elevation: 5 m (16 ft)

Population (31 December 2008)
  - Total: 13,746
  - Density: 286/km^{2} (742/sq mi)
- Demonym: Varazzini
- Time zone: UTC+1 (CET)
  - Summer (DST): UTC+2 (CEST)
- Postal code: 17019
- Dialing code: 019
- Patron saint: St. Catherine of Siena
- Saint day: April 30
- Website: Official website

Varazze (pronounced [vaˈraddze; vaˈrattse]; Ligurian: Väze) is a comune (municipality) in the Province of Savona in the Italian region of Liguria, located about 30 kilometres (19 mi) west of Genoa and about 11 kilometres (7 mi) northeast of Savona in the Riviera di Ponente. Nearby in the Ligurian Apennines is the Monte Beigua with its Natural Regional Park.

Economy is predominantly based on the shipyards, yachting and tourism.

== History ==
The burgh grew around the former Roman station named Ad Navalia, mentioned in the Tabula Peutingeriana. In the Middle Ages, Varazze was the main port of the marquisate of Bosco, one of the three main margraviates of the Aleramici, and disputed between Savona and Genoa, due to its notable ship production. In 1227, it became an independent commune, but by the Treaty of Varazze of 1251 it was annexed along with Savona by the Republic of Genoa, who conceded the fief to the Malocelli in 1290, and to the Doria in 1317.

In 1525, Hugo of Moncada, admiral of emperor Charles V, was defeated here in a naval battle and taken prisoner. Varazze followed the history of Genoa until it was captured by French troops in 1798. In 1815 it became part of the Kingdom of Sardinia. In 1861, it became part of the newly unified Kingdom of Italy and seat of the Giurisdizione di Colombo (Jurisdiction of Columbus).

== Main sights ==
- Romanesque church of San Nazario e Celso (rebuilt in the 16th century). The façade is from 1870.
- Church of San Domenico (1419). It includes Sienese school frescoes and a 16th-century polyptych. Notable is the cloister.
- Church of Sant'Ambrogio. It has a Romanesque façade and a campanile in Gothic-Romanesque style with three orders of mullioned windows. In the interior are a polyptych by Giovanni Barbagelata and a panel by Luca Cambiaso with the Madonna and Sts. John the Baptist and Francis.
- Church of Santa Maria in Latronorio, in the frazione Invrea. A pointed portal remains of the original 12th-century edifice. The interior is home to a large 13th-century fresco.
- Eremo del Deserto ("Hermitage of the Desert"), in the woodland towards the Ligurian Apennine. It is in Baroque style, being built in the 18th century, with a large wall measuring 3 kilometres (1.9 mi) and including a wood and isolated cells of the monks.
- Church of San Donato, from the 5th or 9th century, but mostly rebuilt in the 19th century.
- Remains of the medieval walls

The so-called Passeggiata Europa ("Europa Stroll") is a naturalistic path running on the former Genoa-Ventimiglia railway (closed in 1970), connecting Varazze to Cogoleto. It passes through rocky Maquis shrubland landscape including Aleppo pine vegetation, and overlooks a series of small sea harbours housing rich wildlife.

== Twin towns ==
Varazze is twinned with:

- Palmi, Italy
- Roussillon, Isère, France
- (United States) Alameda, California

== Notable people ==
People from Varazze include:

- Jacobus de Voragine (c. 1230–1298), Italian chronicler, archbishop of Genoa and author of the Golden Legend.
- Francesco Cilea (1866–1950), opera composer, lived the last years of his life in Varazze, where he was Honorary Citizen.
- Lelio Basso (1903–1978), anti-fascist, politician and journalist.
- Raimondo Spiazzi (1918–2002) theologian, advisor to Pius XII and mariologist, lived the last years of his life in Varazze.
- Lancelotto Malocello (1282-1362), explorer, born in Varazze, re-discovered the Canary Islands in 1312. Island of Lanzarote named after him.

== Nature conservation ==
Part of the municipality territory is within the boundaries of the Parco naturale regionale del Beigua.
