= Tiglieto =

- Comune
- Comune di Tiglieto
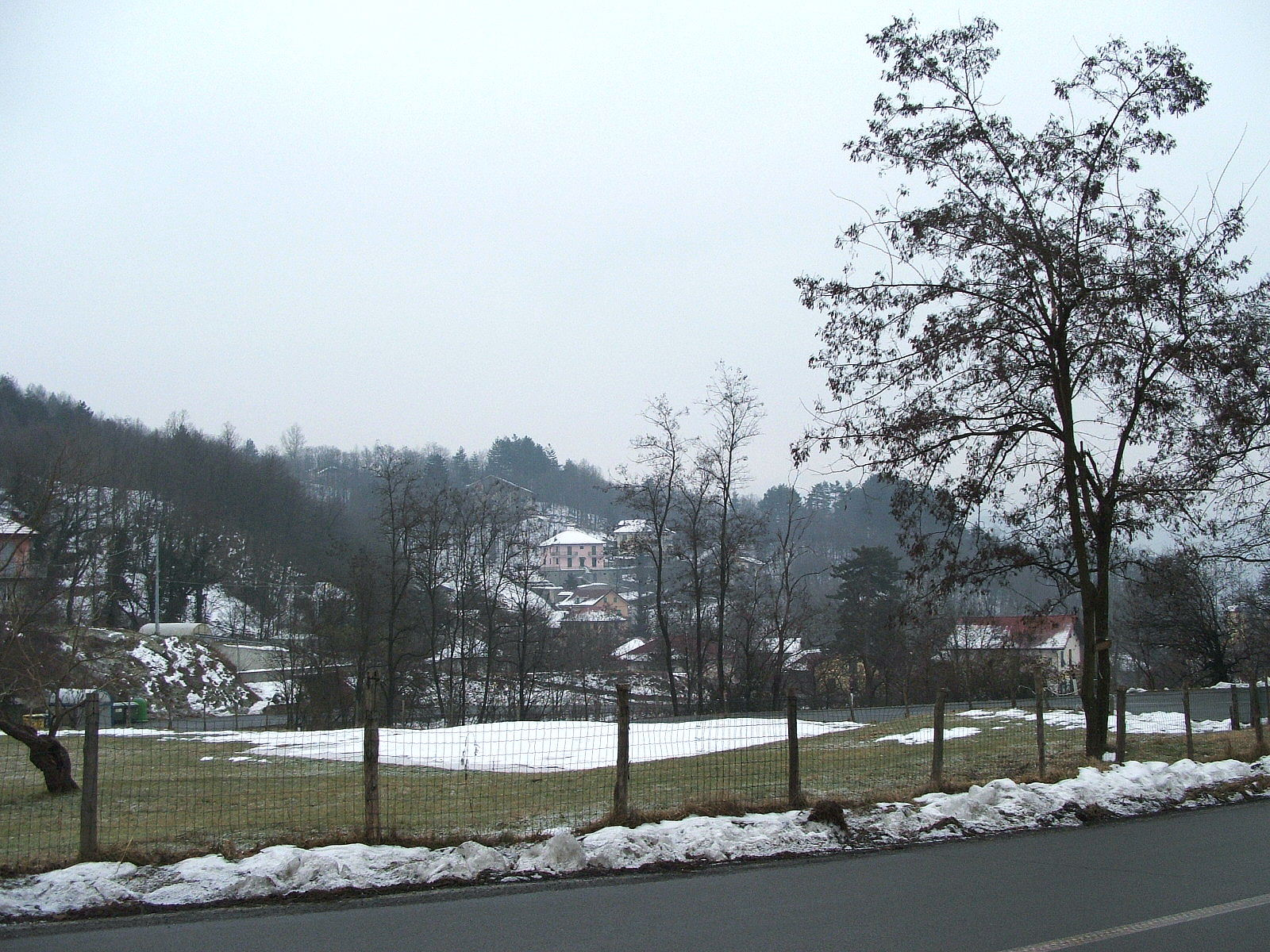

- Coat of arms

- Location within Italy Location within Liguria
- Coordinates: 44°32′N 8°37′E
- Country: Italy
- Region: Liguria
- Metropolitan city: Genoa (GE)
- Frazioni: Acquabuona

Government
  - Mayor: Giorgio Leoncini

Area
  - Total: 24.5 km^{2} (9.5 sq mi)
- Elevation: 500 m (1,600 ft)

Population (31 December 2015)
  - Total: 546
  - Density: 22.3/km^{2} (57.7/sq mi)
- Demonym: Tiglietesi
- Time zone: UTC+1 (CET)
  - Summer (DST): UTC+2 (CEST)
- Postal code: 16010
- Dialing code: 010
- Patron saint: Assumption of Mary
- Saint day: August 15
- Website: Official website

Tiglieto (Ligurian: Tijê, Orbasco dialect: Muncaru) is a comune (municipality) in the Metropolitan City of Genoa in the Italian region Liguria, located about 52 kilometres (32 mi) northwest of Genoa.

Tiglieto borders the following municipalities: Campo Ligure, Genoa, Masone, Molare, Ponzone, Rossiglione, Sassello, Urbe.

== History ==
In 1120 Tiglieto Abbey (Badia di Tiglieto) was the first Cistercian monastery to be founded in Italy. Its monks went on to found Staffarda Abbey, near Saluzzo, and Casanova Abbey.

== Main sights ==
Part of the municipality territory is within the boundaries of the Parco naturale regionale del Beigua.
