= Rossiglione =

Rossiglione Rsciogni (Ligurian)
- Comune
- Comune di Rossiglione
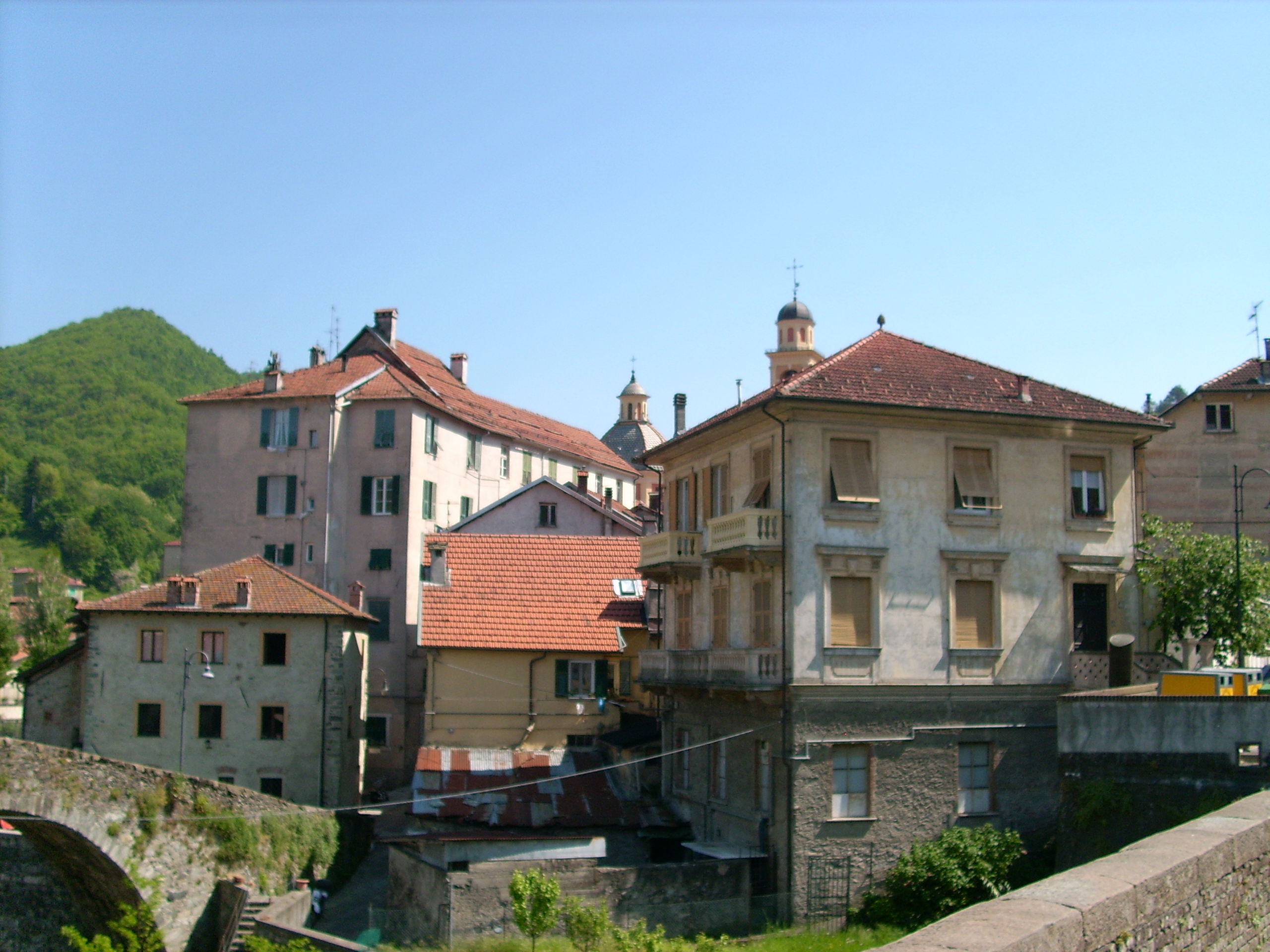

- Coat of arms

- Location within Italy Location within Liguria
- Coordinates: 44°34′N 8°40′E
- Country: Italy
- Region: Liguria
- Metropolitan city: Genoa (GE)
- Frazioni: Garrone

Government
  - Mayor: Omar Peruzzo

Area
  - Total: 47.59 km^{2} (18.37 sq mi)
- Elevation: 300 m (980 ft)

Population (1 January 2021)
  - Total: 2,602
  - Density: 54.68/km^{2} (141.6/sq mi)
- Demonym: Rossiglionese(i)
- Time zone: UTC+1 (CET)
  - Summer (DST): UTC+2 (CEST)
- Postal code: 16010
- Dialing code: 010
- Website: Official website

Rossiglione (Ligurian: Rosciggion [ɾuʃiˈdʒuŋ], locally Rsciogni [ˈɹʃuɲɲi]/[ɚˈʂᵊʊ̃ɲɲi]) is a comune (municipality) in the Metropolitan City of Genoa in the Italian region Liguria, located about 41 kilometres (25 mi) northwest of Genoa. It has a population of 2 558 people.

Rossiglione borders the following municipalities: Belforte Monferrato, Bosio, Campo Ligure, Molare, Ovada, Tagliolo Monferrato, Tiglieto.

== Nature conservation ==
Part of the municipality territory is within the boundaries of the Parco naturale regionale del Beigua.

== Asteroid ==
Asteroid 9101 Rossiglione, discovered by astronomers at the Farra d'Isonzo Observatory in 1996, was named after the Italian village. The official naming citation was published by the Minor Planet Center on 8 November 2019 (M.P.C. 118218).
