= Giardino Botanico Montano di Pratorondanino =

Botanical garden in Italy

Coordinates: 44°28′11″N 8°53′44″E

- Type: Botanical
- Location: Campo Ligure, Italy
- Area: 0.6 hectares (1.5 acres)
- Opened: 1979
- Owner: Province of Genoa

The Giardino Botanico Montano di Pratorondanino is a nature preserve and botanical garden located at 750 meters altitude in Pratorondanino, Campo Ligure, Province of Genoa, Liguria, Italy. It is open during the warmer months.

== History ==
The garden was established in 1979 by GLAO (Group Ligure Amatori Orchids), and since 1983 has expanded to encompass additional species, primarily from the Alps and Apennine mountain.

== Species ==
Its collections include:

- 14 species of rhododendrons
- 2 specimens commonly called sequoia: Sequoiadendron giganteum and Sequoia sempervirens
- Ginkgo biloba
- a rare Wollemia nobilis
- many orchids especially Cypripedium
- Ligurian mountain flora including Viola bertolonii and Cerastium utriense
- a collection of 50 Sempervivum
- numerous Sedum
- endangered species including: Eryngium alpinum, Lilium pomponium and Wulfenia carinthiaca.

It also contains numerous trees common to the region including: Abies alba

- Fagus sylvatica
- Larix decidua
- Castanea sativa
- Picea abies
- Pinus mugo
- Prunus avium
- Quercus petraea
- Robinia pseudoacacia
- Sorbus aucuparia
- Taxus baccata

== See also ==
- List of botanical gardens in Italy

== Image gallery ==
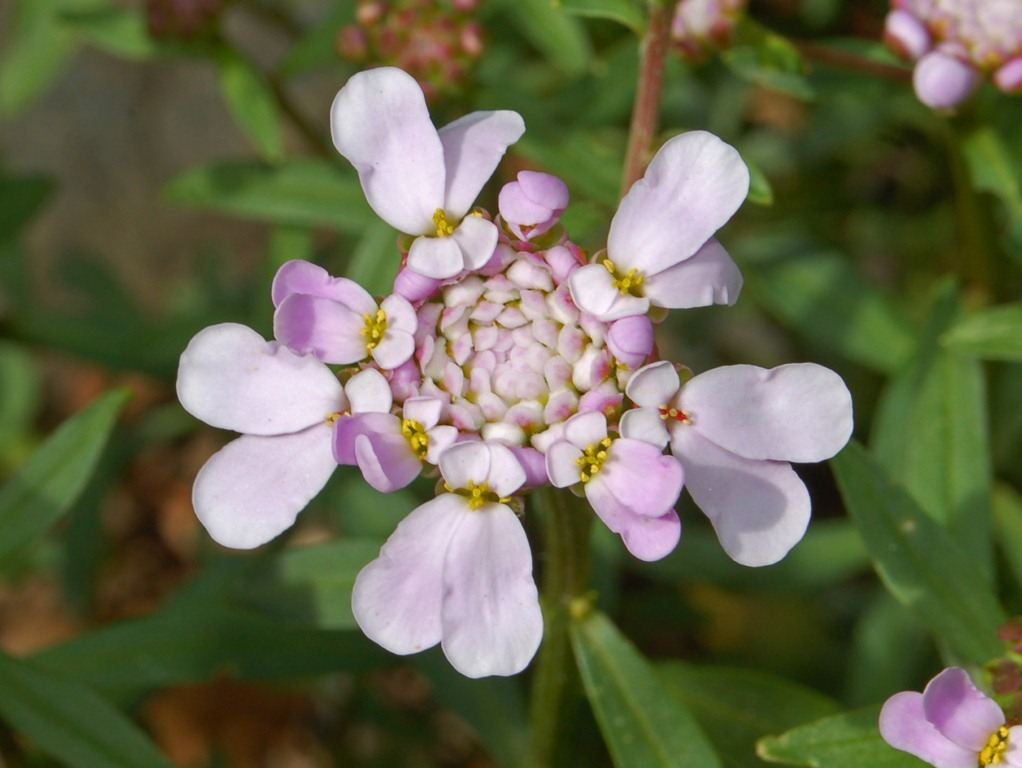
Iberis umbellata (Brassicaceae)

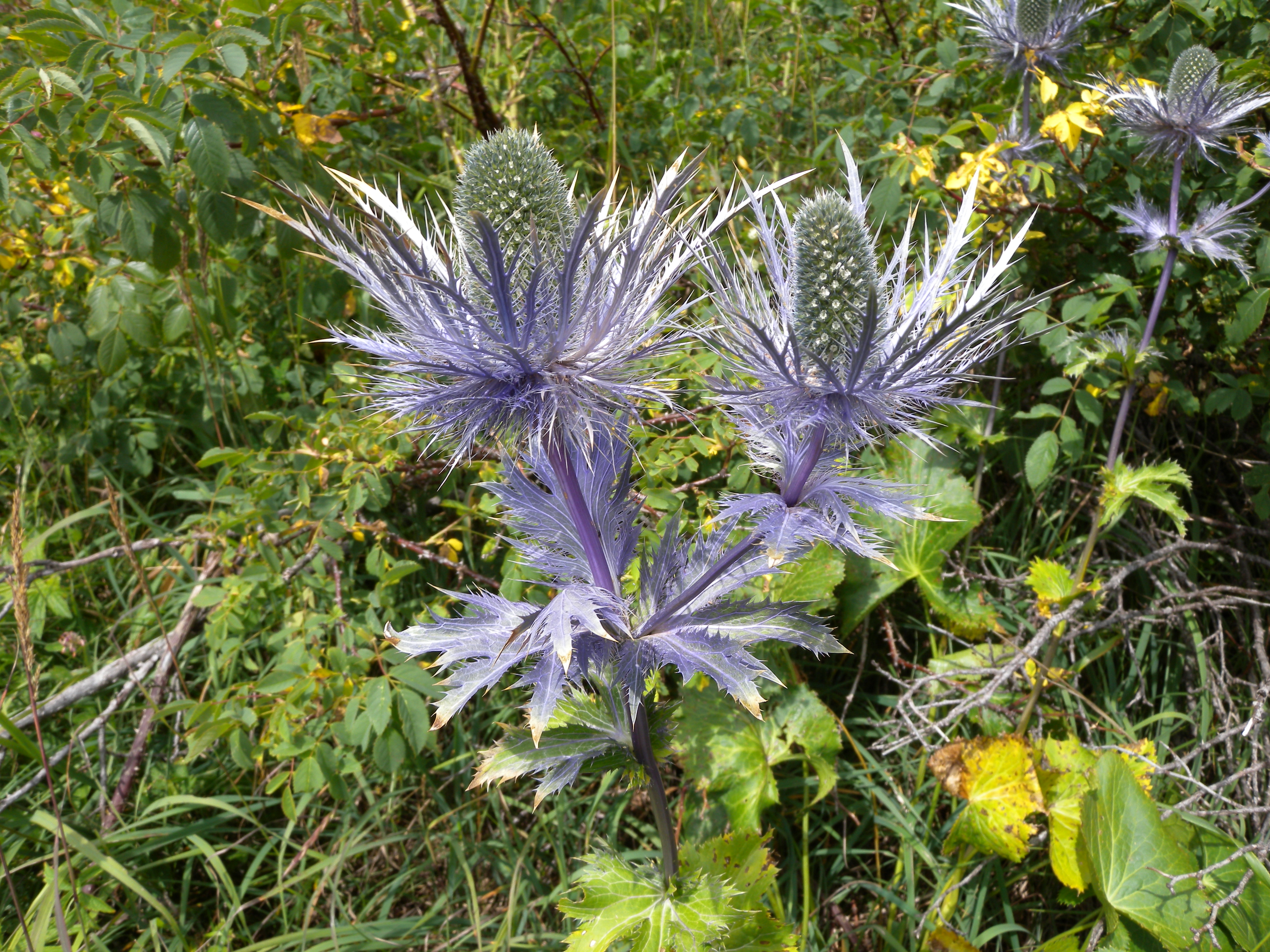
Eryngium alpinum (Asteraceae)

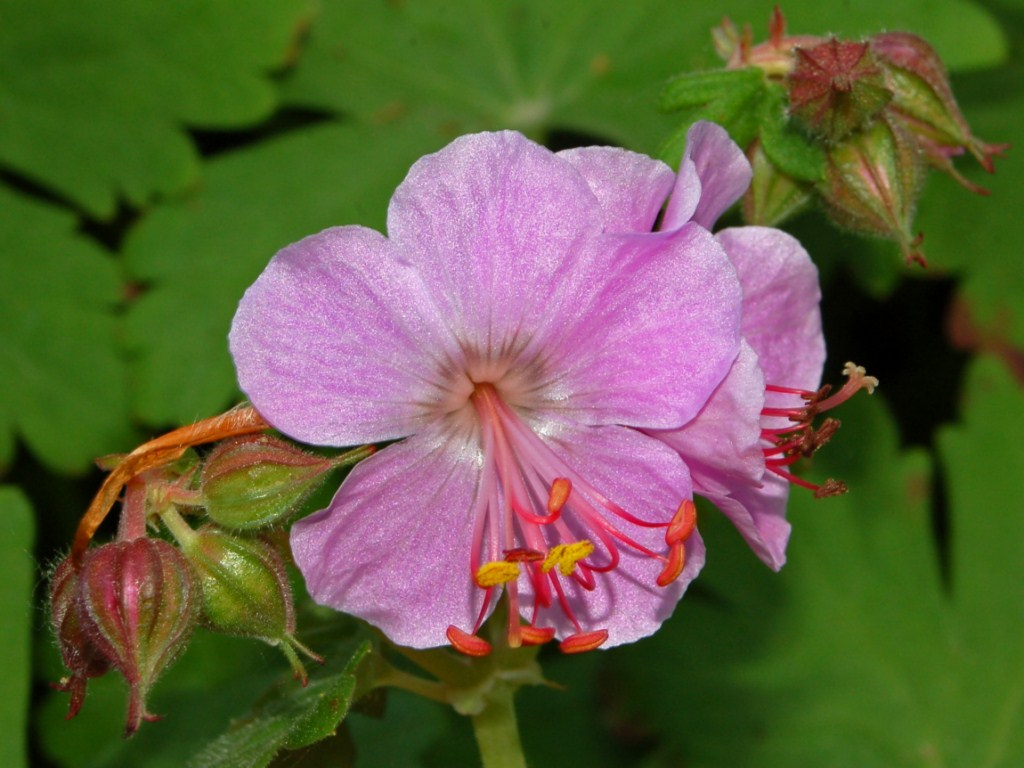
Geranium caespitosum var. fremontii (Geraniaceae)

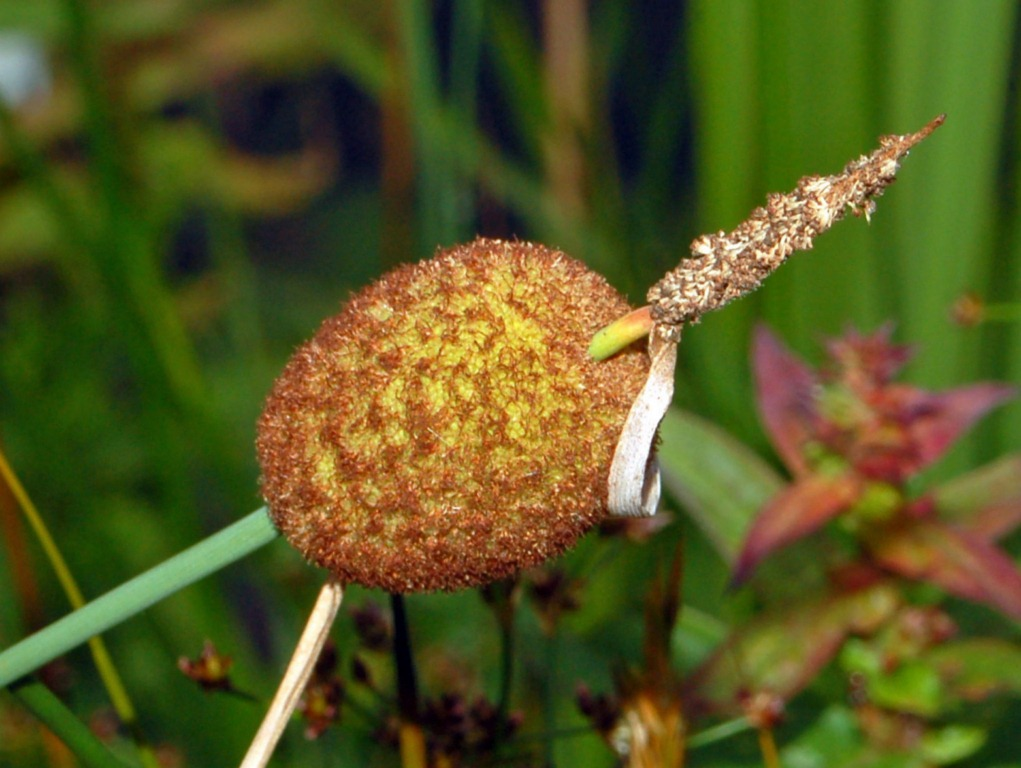
Typha minima (Typhaceae)

== Bibliography ==
- AA.VV. (2003). G.L.A.O., (Gruppo ligure amatori orchidee) (ed.). Un giardino botanico a Pratorondanino. Provincia di Genova.
