= Arenzano =

- Comune
- Comune di Arenzano
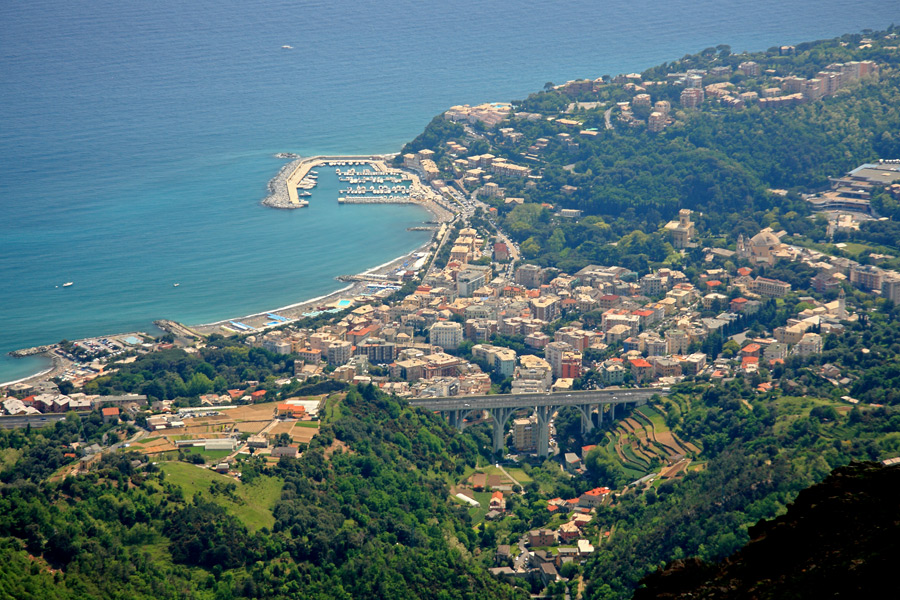

- Coat of arms

- Location of Arenzano in Italy Arenzano (Liguria)
- Coordinates: 44°24′15″N 8°40′50″E
- Country: Italy
- Region: Liguria
- Metropolitan city: Genoa (GE)
- Frazioni: Terralba

Government
  - Mayor: Luigi Gambino

Area
  - Total: 24.3 km^{2} (9.4 sq mi)
- Elevation: 6 m (20 ft)

Population (30 April 2017)
  - Total: 11,445
  - Density: 471/km^{2} (1,220/sq mi)
- Demonym: Arenzanesi
- Time zone: UTC+1 (CET)
  - Summer (DST): UTC+2 (CEST)
- Postal code: 16011
- Dialing code: 010
- Patron saint: San Nazario and Celso
- Saint day: 28 July
- Website: Official website

Arenzano (local Ligurian: Rensën) is a coastal town and comune in the Metropolitan City of Genoa, Liguria, northern Italy, facing the Ligurian Sea. As of 2017, it has a population of 11,445. This varies during the holiday seasons due to tourist flow.

There are a number of festivals during the summer. The town is home to many of the employees of the nearby architectural firm of Renzo Piano.

== Geography ==
Arenzano is located in the Riviera di Ponente section of the Italian Riviera, within a bay formed by the Capo San Martino not far from the metropolitan capital of Genoa.

Part of the municipality territory, which is about two thirds mountainous, is within the boundaries of the Parco naturale regionale del Beigua.

The vast majority of the town's territory extends in the mountain range of the Beigua Regional Park with peaks above 1000 m above sea level.

Arenzano's major rivers are:

- Lerone (natural boundary between Arenzano and Cogoleto)
- Cantarena
- Lissolo

== History ==
According to historical sources, the first residential settlement was linked to a primitive settlement of the Roman Empire in the first centuries after Christ. The ancient toponym of the municipality, Arentianis, would go back to a property or possession of the Arentii Ligurian family. As well as the nearby towns and villages, it followed the historical vicissitudes of nearby Genoa in the early medieval period, and therefore in the Middle Ages.

== Main sights ==
- Sanctuary of the Infant Jesus of Prague.
- The 18th-century parish church.
- Villa Negrotto Cambiaso, a Genoese patrician villa built in the 16th century. It is now the town hall. It has a beautiful park, endowed with rare trees like Lebanon cedars and Araucarias.
- The Saracens' Tower (16th century), built to prevent sudden incursions of pirates from Maghreb.
- Sanctuary of Our Lady of the Olivette.

== Twin towns ==
- Loutraki, Greece, since 1957
- Pontoise, France, since 1958
- Domburg, The Netherlands, since 1958
- El Jadida, Morocco, since 1964
- Tata, Hungary, since 1994
