= Mele, Liguria =

Mele Mê
- Comune
- Comune di Mele
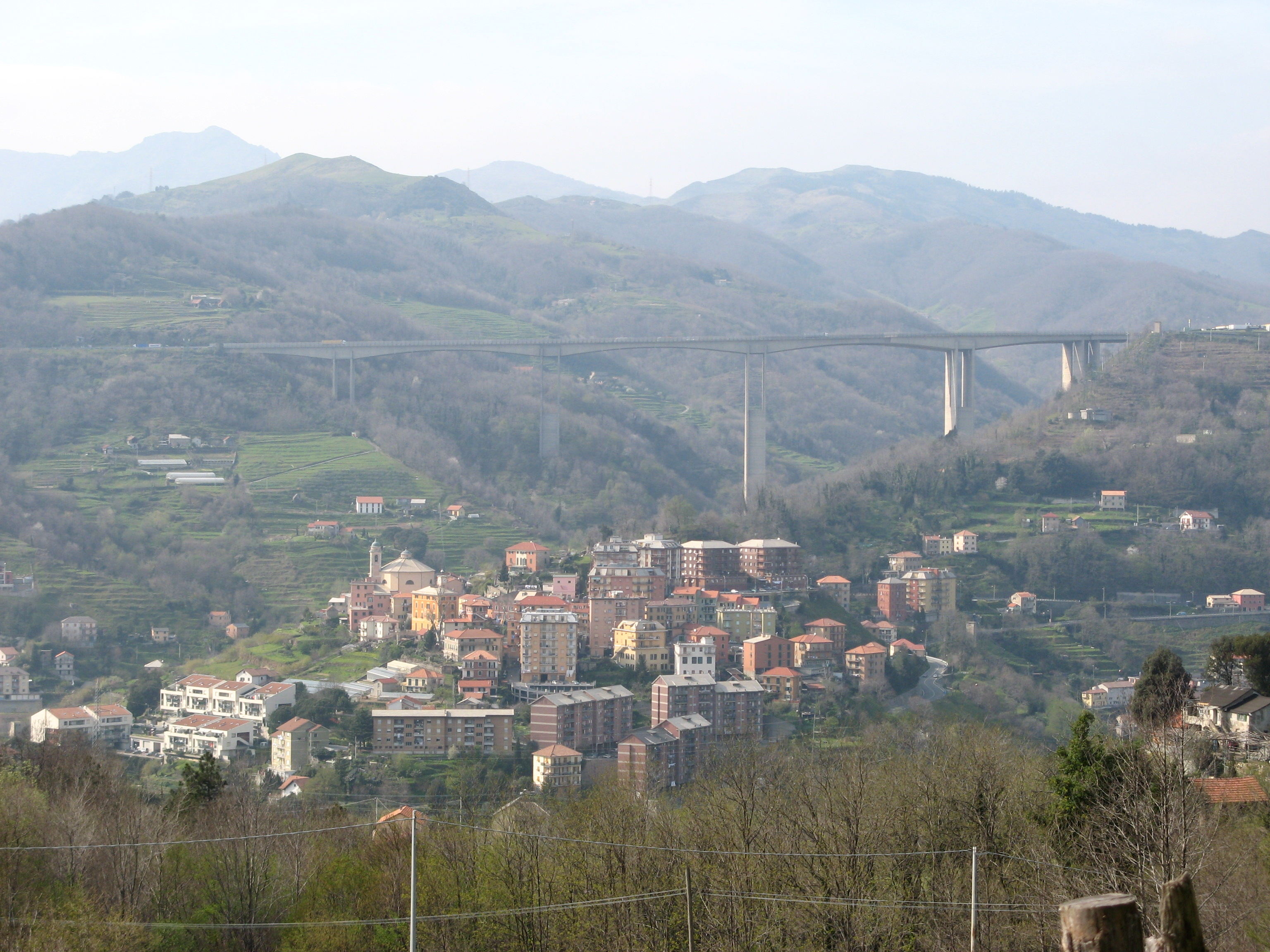

- Coat of arms

- Location within Italy Location within Liguria
- Coordinates: 44°27′N 8°45′E
- Country: Italy
- Region: Liguria
- Metropolitan city: Genoa (GE)
- Frazioni: Acquasanta, Biscaccia, Fado, Ferriera/Fondocrosa

Government
  - Mayor: Mirco Ferrando

Area
  - Total: 16.9 km^{2} (6.5 sq mi)
- Elevation: 125 m (410 ft)

Population (30 November 2009)
  - Total: 2,687
  - Density: 159/km^{2} (412/sq mi)
- Demonym: Melesi
- Time zone: UTC+1 (CET)
  - Summer (DST): UTC+2 (CEST)
- Postal code: 16010
- Dialing code: 010
- Patron saint: Antonio
- Saint day: 17 Gennaio
- Website: Official website

Mele (Ligurian: Mê) is a Comune (Municipality) in the Metropolitan City of Genoa in the Italian region Liguria, located about 21 kilometres (13 mi) west of Genoa, and historically famous for the production of paper.

Mele borders the following municipalities: Genoa, Masone.
