= Monte Sciguello =

Mountain in Italy

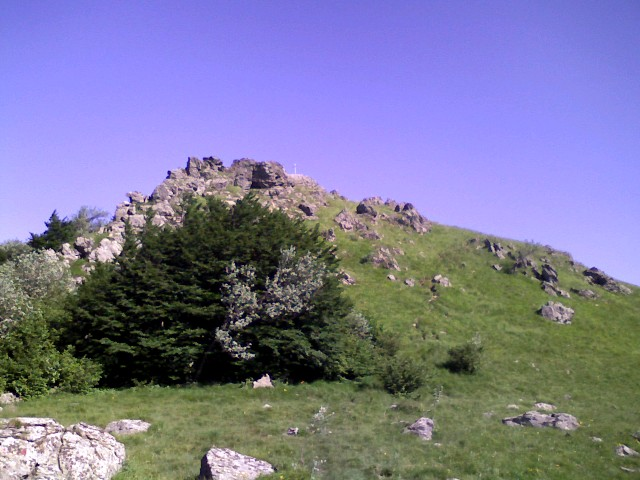

Highest point
- Elevation: 1,103 m (3,619 ft)
- Coordinates: 44°25′17″N 8°35′24″E

Geography
- Location within Italy
- Location: Liguria, Italy
- Parent range: Ligurian Apennines

Monte Sciguello is a mountain in Liguria, northern Italy, part of the Ligurian Apennines.

== Toponymy ==
The mountain's name comes from the Ligurian term sciguelu, which means whistle, flute.
