= Masone =

Masone Mason (Ligurian)
- Comune
- Comune di Masone
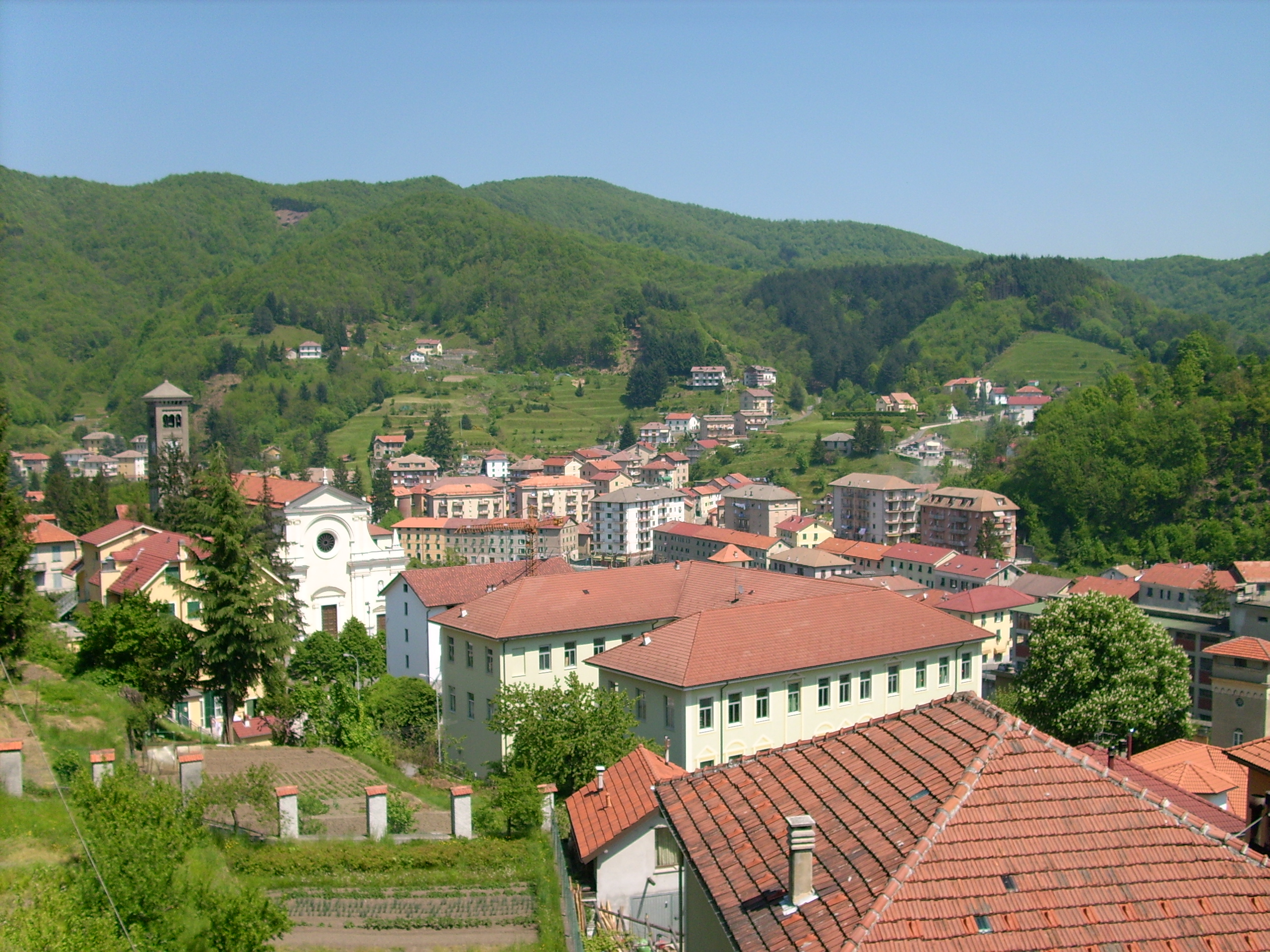
- Masone

- Location within Italy Location within Liguria
- Coordinates: 44°30′N 8°43′E
- Country: Italy
- Region: Liguria
- Metropolitan city: Genoa (GE)

Government
  - Mayor: Omar Missarelli

Area
  - Total: 29.44 km^{2} (11.37 sq mi)
- Elevation: 406 m (1,332 ft)

Population (December 2004)
  - Total: 3,621
  - Density: 123.0/km^{2} (318.6/sq mi)
- Demonym: Masonesi
- Time zone: UTC+1 (CET)
  - Summer (DST): UTC+2 (CEST)
- Postal code: 16010
- Dialing code: 010
- Website: Official website

Masone (Ligurian: Mazun or Mason [maˈzuŋ]) is a comune (municipality) in the Metropolitan City of Genoa in the Italian region Liguria, located about 32 kilometres (20 mi) northwest of Genoa.

Masone borders the following municipalities: Bosio, Campo Ligure, Genoa, Mele, Tiglieto.

== See also ==
- Bric del Dente
- Stura di Ovada
- Cascata del Serpente
