= Monte Orditano =

Mountain in Italy

- Location within Italy

Highest point
- Elevation: 950 m (3,120 ft)
- Prominence: 85 m (279 ft)
- Coordinates: 44°31′02″N 8°48′47″E

Geography
- Location: Liguria, Italy
- Parent range: Ligurian Apennines

Monte Orditano is a mountain in Liguria, northern Italy, part of the Ligurian Apennines.

== Geography ==
The mountain lies at an altitude of 950 metres. It's located in the town of Ceranesi in the Province of Genoa, not far from the border with Piedmont.
