= Monte Beigua =

Mountain in Italy

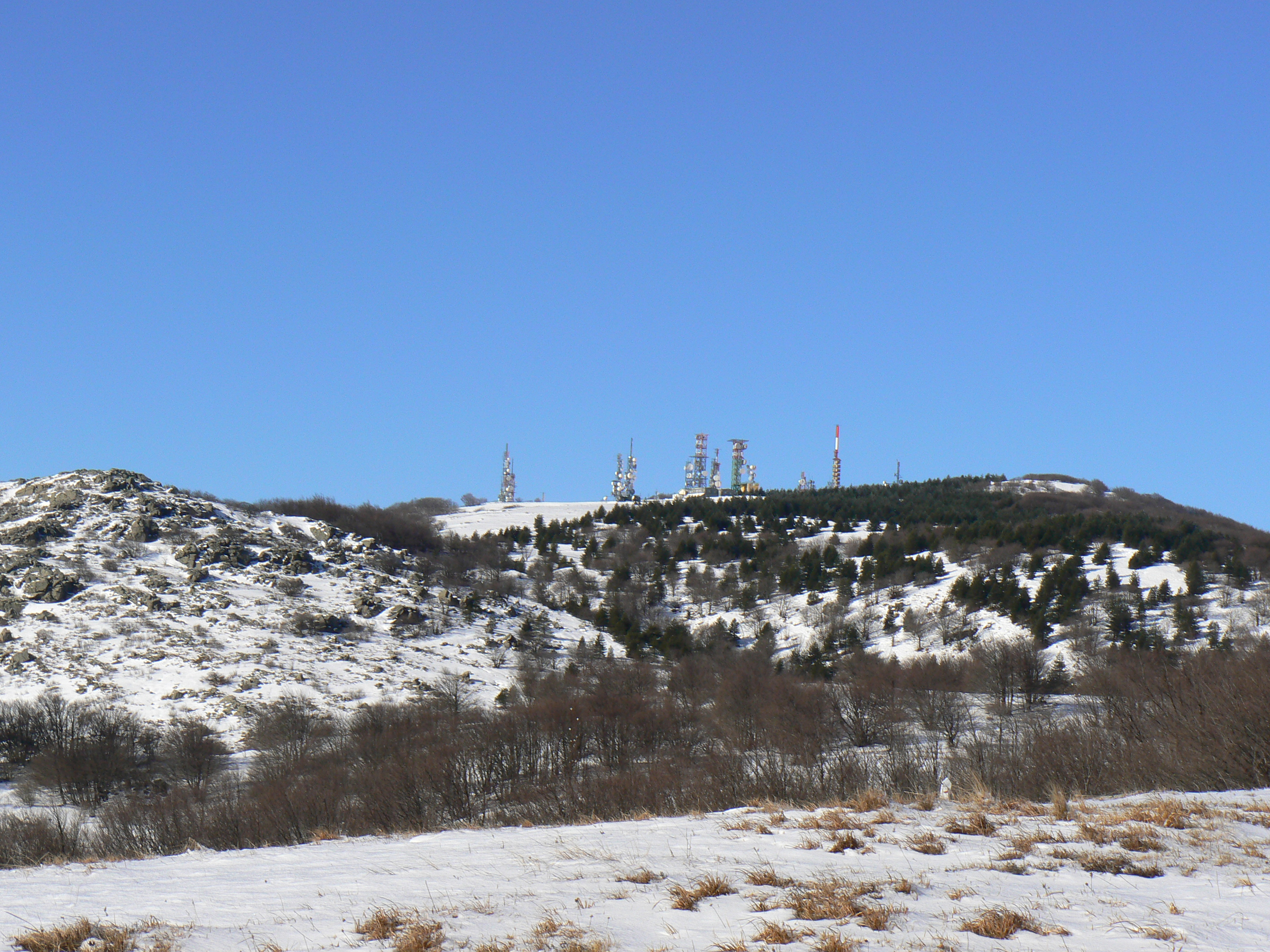
- The peak of Mount Beigua

Highest point
- Elevation: 1,287 m (4,222 ft)
- Prominence: 815 m (2,674 ft)
- Isolation: 35.58 km (22.11 mi)
- Listing: Mountains of Italy
- Coordinates: 44°26′00″N 08°33′55″E

Geography
- Location within Italy
- Country: Italy
- Region: Liguria
- Protected area: Beigua Natural Regional Park
- Parent range: Ligurian Apennines

Climbing
- First ascent: ancestral

Monte Beigua (also in Ligurian: Monte Peigoa) is a mountain in the Ligurian Apennines in Liguria, northern Italy, between the two communes of Varazze and Sassello.

== Geography ==
The mountain, at 1,287 m, is the highest peak in the so-called Gruppo del Beigua including Monte Grosso (1,265 m), Monte Ermetta (1,267 m) and Bric Veciri (1,263). The upper part of the mountain houses transmission antennas used by RAI (Italian state television) and other private networks.

== History ==
It has been hypothized that it was a sacred mountain to the Liguri tribe living here in pre-Roman times, together with the Mont Bégo and Monte Sagro. It has been identified as a Neolithic source of jadeite.

== Nature conservation ==
It is included in the eponymous Regional Park.
