= Ovada =

- Comune
- Comune di Ovada
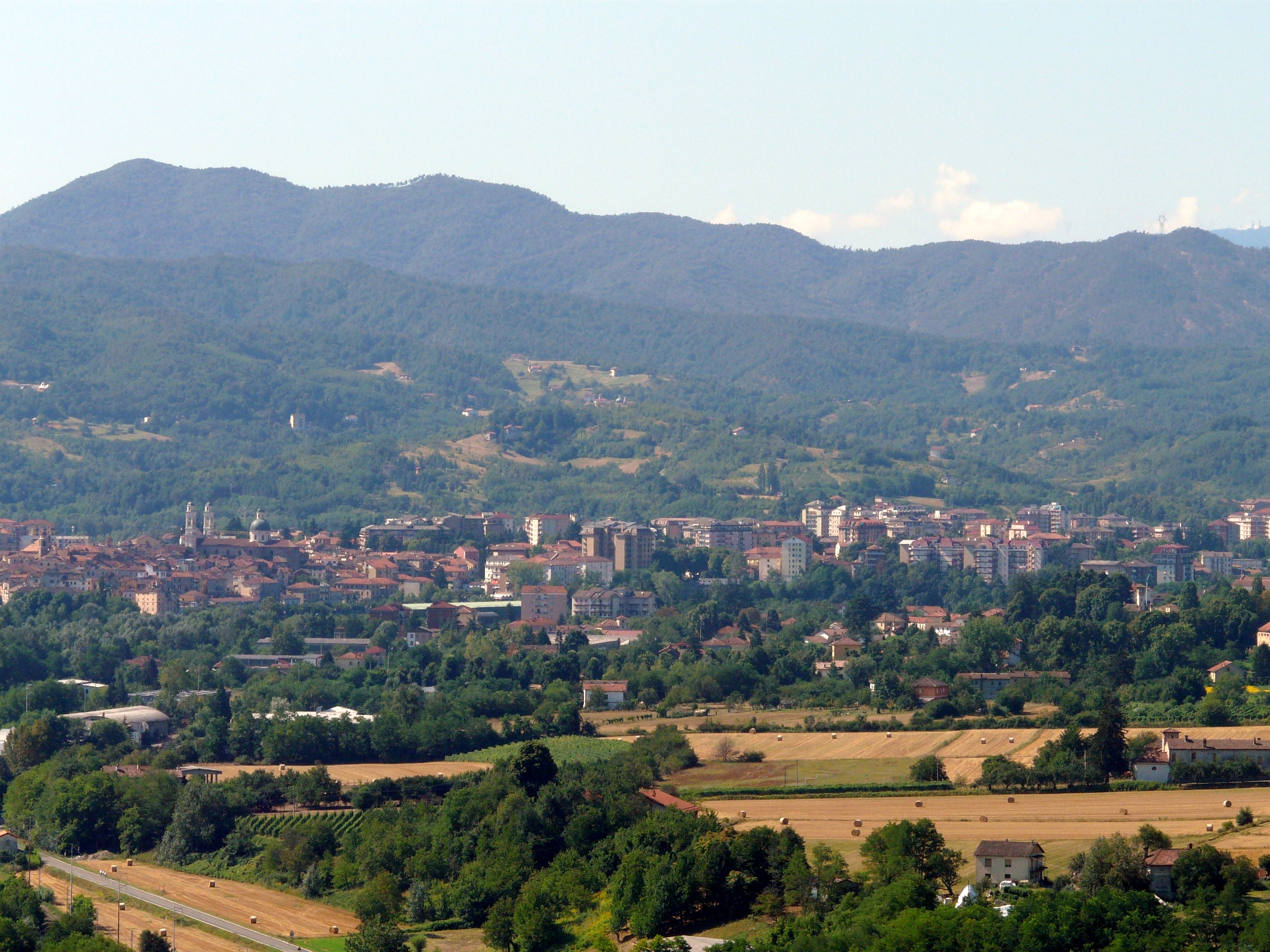

- Coat of arms

- Location within Italy Location within Piedmont
- Coordinates: 44°38′10″N 8°38′30″E
- Country: Italy
- Region: Piedmont
- Province: Alessandria (AL)
- Frazioni: Costa, Gnocchetto, Grillano, San Lorenzo

Government
  - Mayor: Gian Franco Comaschi

Area
  - Total: 35.3 km^{2} (13.6 sq mi)
- Elevation: 186 m (610 ft)

Population (31 December 2015)
  - Total: 11,484
  - Density: 325/km^{2} (843/sq mi)
- Demonym: Ovadesi
- Time zone: UTC+1 (CET)
  - Summer (DST): UTC+2 (CEST)
- Postal code: 15076
- Dialing code: 0143
- Patron saint: San Paolo della Croce
- Saint day: 18 October
- Website: Official website

Ovada (Uà and Guà in Ligurian, Ovà in Piedmontese) is a comune (municipality) of 11,484 inhabitants in the Province of Alessandria in the northern Italian region Piedmont, located about 90 kilometres (56 mi) southeast of Turin and about 30 kilometres (19 mi) south of Alessandria.

Ovada is the main comune of the Ovadese area, an area of the Lower Piedmont and Upper Montferrat, located in the southern portion of the province of Alessandria.Their patron saint is San Paolo della Croce. His saint’s day is on 18 October.

== Geography ==
The area, located on the northern foothills of the Ligurian-Piedmontese Apennines and at the entrance of the Stura valley leading to the Turchino pass, is hilly, tending to mountainous heading south, with plains where agriculture is practiced and where the industries have established their factories near the main connections. The city lies on the confluence of the Stura of Ovada torrent into the Orba river, at an altitude of 186 meters above sea level.

The fauna includes badgers, dormice, deer, wild boar, martens, squirrels, hares, partridges, foxes and weasels. There are also nocturnal birds like owls, hawks, kestrels and buzzards. The more frequent fish is trout.

== Sport ==
The 2024 Milano-Sanremo cycle race passed through Ovado on March 16.

== Climate ==
The climate is temperate with quite marked features of continental climate. Being protected from the south by the south and south-west winds by the chain of the Apennines, the winters have moderate snowfalls: Ovada receives more snowfall than other Italian towns located at the same altitude since the territory of the low Alessandrino and generally in Lower Piedmont, is often home to major inversions that warm southerly winds fail to unseat. Also for this reason, morning temperatures in winter easily drop below 0 °C. The close proximity to the Ligurian Sea (less than 25 km), where cyclones often dig deep minimum of low pressure, combined with the orographic lift effect of the Apennines south of Ovada, mean that precipitation proves fairly abundant especially in the autumn months. Spring is often very windy and moderately rainy. Summer in Ovada is the driest season, unlike the rest of the Piedmont (where, due to the proximity of the Alps, storms often form). Remaining, even in summer, rather windy, the summer weather in Ovada hardly looks sultry and temperatures only during strong African heat waves exceed 30 °C. In the fall with the return of the Atlantic cyclones the weather is often overcast and rainy, and occasionally the fog appears, although much less than in other areas of Piedmont and the Po Valley. Ovada is also affected for a few days a year of moist air coming from the Ligurian Sea, called Marin, which in some cases can even lead the smell of salt air in these territories and mild temperatures even in winter.

Climate data for Ovada, elevation: 193 m (633 ft), modeled 1999-2019 averages
Month	Jan	Feb	Mar	Apr	May	Jun	Jul	Aug	Sep	Oct	Nov	Dec	Year
Mean daily maximum °C (°F)	5.9 (42.6)	7.4 (45.3)	11.6 (52.9)	15.2 (59.4)	19.0 (66.2)	23.8 (74.8)	26.4 (79.5)	26.1 (79.0)	21.6 (70.9)	16.4 (61.5)	10.5 (50.9)	6.6 (43.9)	15.9 (60.6)
Daily mean °C (°F)	2.3 (36.1)	3.4 (38.1)	7.2 (45.0)	10.8 (51.4)	14.8 (58.6)	19.3 (66.7)	21.7 (71.1)	21.5 (70.7)	17.3 (63.1)	12.8 (55.0)	7.4 (45.3)	3.3 (37.9)	11.8 (53.2)
Mean daily minimum °C (°F)	−0.6 (30.9)	−0.2 (31.6)	2.8 (37.0)	6.4 (43.5)	10.4 (50.7)	14.7 (58.5)	17.1 (62.8)	17.1 (62.8)	13.3 (55.9)	9.5 (49.1)	4.5 (40.1)	0.4 (32.7)	8.0 (46.3)
Average precipitation mm (inches)	70 (2.8)	62 (2.4)	67 (2.6)	88 (3.5)	78 (3.1)	57 (2.2)	40 (1.6)	52 (2.0)	91 (3.6)	121 (4.8)	139 (5.5)	80 (3.1)	945 (37.2)
Average rainy days	6	5	6	8	8	7	5	6	7	8	8	7	81
Average relative humidity (%)	82	77	73	73	73	70	65	68	71	79	83	81	75
Mean daily sunshine hours	4.6	5.7	7.3	8.7	10.5	11.8	12.0	10.7	8.8	5.5	4.2	4.4	7.9
Source: climate-data.org
