= Bric Merizzo =

Mountain in the Ligurian Prealps, Italy

- Monte Merizzo
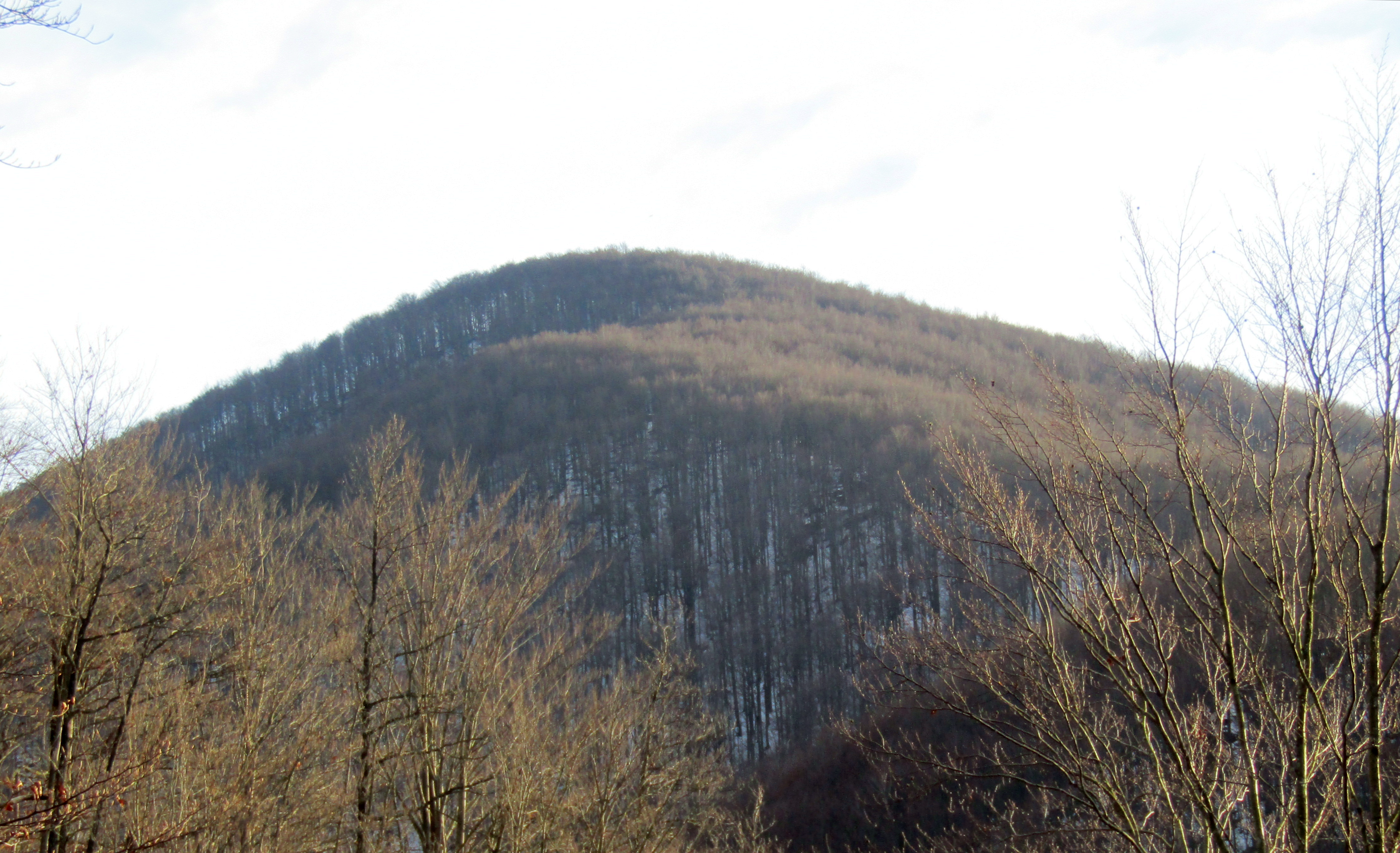
- The Po Valley side of the mountain

Highest point
- Elevation: 1,275 m (4,183 ft)
- Prominence: 100 m (330 ft)
- Coordinates: 44°13′25″N 8°11′05″E

Geography
- Location within Italy
- State: Liguria
- Parent range: Ligurian Prealps; Alps

The Bric Merizzo (1,275 meters above sea level) is a mountain in the Ligurian Prealps.

== Description ==
The mountain is located just southwest of the Colle del Melogno in the Ligurian Prealps. The summit lies on the administrative boundary between the municipalities of Magliolo and Calizzano, and it is part of the main Alpine ridge. To the northeast, after a saddle at about 1,135 meters elevation, it rises to Bric Tortagna (1,165 m) before reaching the Colle del Melogno. In the opposite direction, the Po Valley-Ligurian watershed forms a saddle at 1,175 m, where the Barbottina forestry house is located, then rises to Bric Bedò and continues with Monte Grosso and Bric Agnellino. Its topographic prominence is therefore 100 meters. The Po Valley side of Bric Merizzo is covered by extensive beech forests, including the Foresta della Barbottina, characterized by centuries-old specimens. The Ligurian side feeds one of the headwaters of the Maremola stream, while the waters flowing toward the Val Bormida are collected by the Frassino stream, a tributary of the Bormida di Millesimo.

== History ==
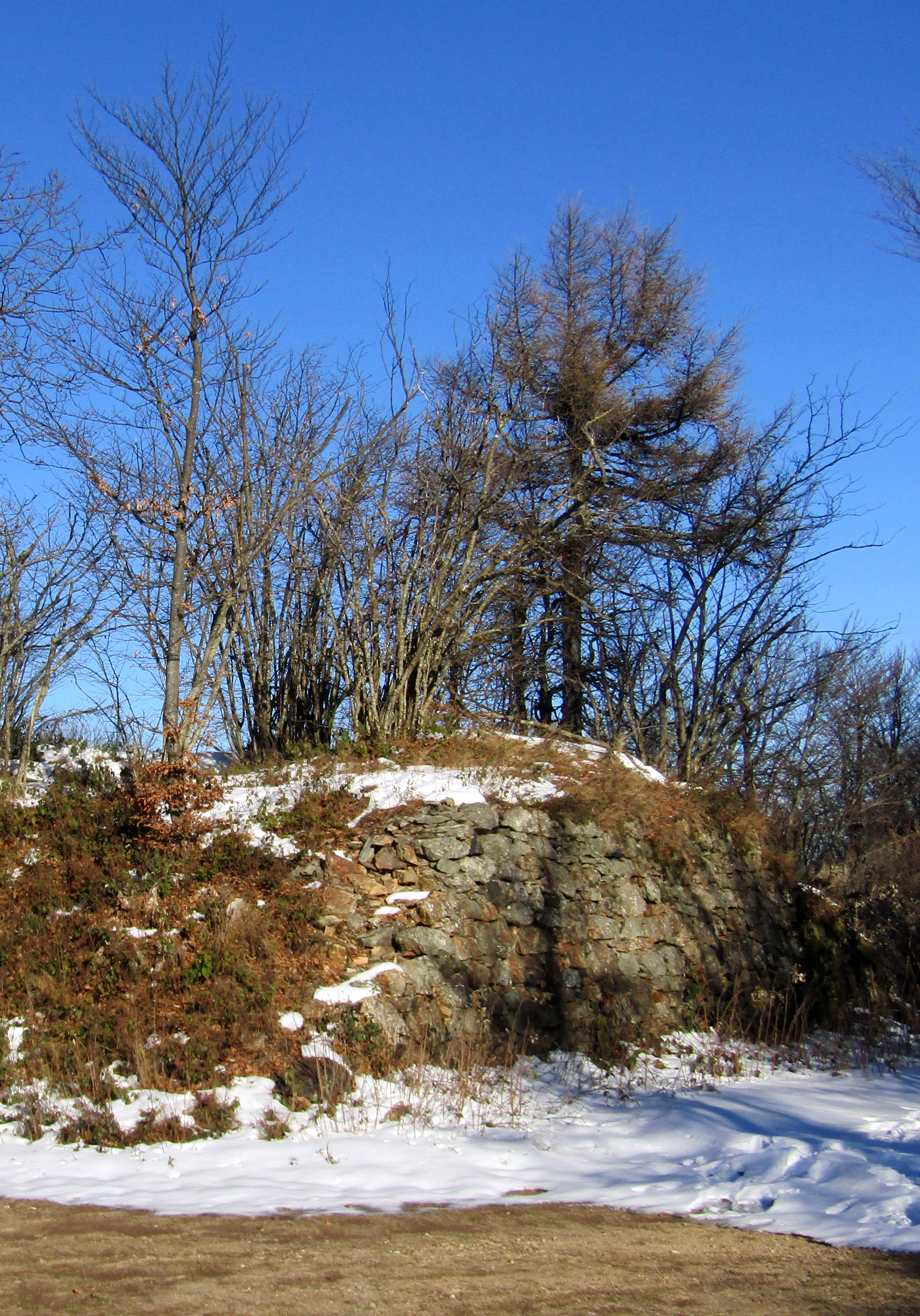
The remains of the fortified battery of Bricco Merizzo

The Bric Merizzo area was involved in armed clashes related to Napoleon Bonaparte’s Italian Campaign. Just southwest of the mountain’s highest point, the remains of the Batteria di Bricco Merizzo are found, a fortification built between 1883 and 1890 as support for the Forte Centrale del Melogno.

== Access to the summit ==
The summit is reachable with a short detour from the Alta Via dei Monti Liguri, in its stage connecting the Giogo di Giustenice with the Colle del Melogno.

== Environmental protection ==
The mountain and surrounding area are part of the SIC (Site of Community Importance) named Monte Carmo - Monte Settepani (code: IT1323112).

== Bibliography ==
- Lorenzo Montaldo (1981). "Gruppo del Monte Carmo" [Monte Carmo Group]. Alpi Liguri [Ligurian Alps]. Guida dei Monti d'Italia (in Italian). CAI-TCI.

Maps

- Cartografia ufficiale italiana in scala 1:25.000 e 1:100.000 [Official Italian cartography at scales 1:25,000 and 1:100,000] (in Italian). Istituto Geografico Militare.
- Carta dei sentieri e stradale scala 1:25.000 n. 26 Bassa val Tanaro Val Bormida e Cebano [Trail and road map scale 1:25,000 no. 26 Lower Tanaro Valley, Bormida Valley, and Cebano] (in Italian). Ciriè: Fraternali editore.
