= Ligurian Prealps =

Mountain range in Italy

- Eastern Ligurian Alps
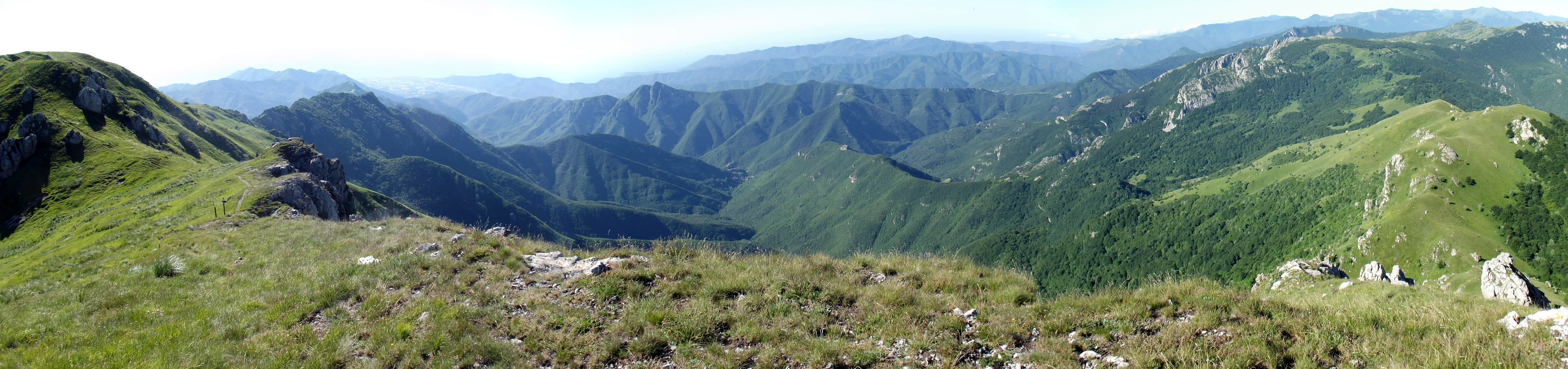
- The chain as seen from the Galerotto

Highest point
- Peak: Monte Armetta
- Elevation: 1,739 m (5,705 ft)

Naming
- Native name: Prealpi Liguri (Italian); Alpi Liguri Orientali (Italian)

Geography
- Location within Alps
- Country: Italy
- Region: Piedmont and Liguria
- Range coordinates: 44°08′13″N 7°56′22″E
- Parent range: Alps

Geology
- Orogeny: Alpine orogeny

The Ligurian Prealps (in Italian Prealpi Liguri or Alpi Liguri Orientali, in French Préalpes liguriennes) are a mountain range in northwestern Italy. They belong to the Ligurian Alps and are located between the regions of Piemonte (province of Cuneo) and Liguria (province of Savona, province of Imperia). Their highest summit is the monte Armetta, at an elevation of 1,739 metres (5,705 ft).

== History ==
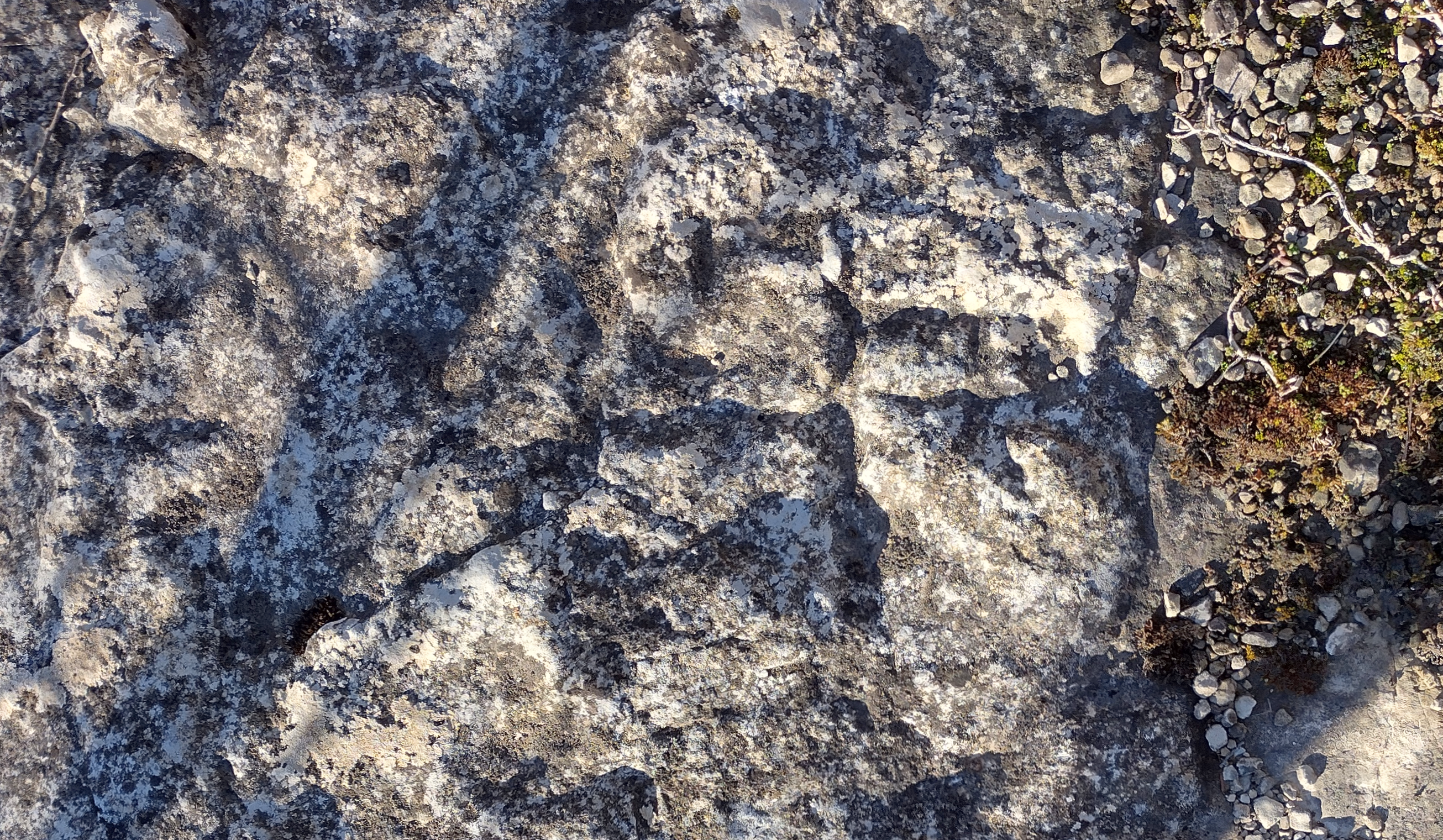
Crosses engraved on a rock on the Castell'Ermo

Human settlement in the Ligurian Prealps is very ancient and left significant traces in various places, also thanks to a number of natural caves which eased the conservation of prehistoric remains and artifacts. The area was involved in the Italian campaigns of Napoleone Bonaparte and several fortresses were built on the chain summit and mountain passes. Before the Industrial Revolution and the spreading of motorized traffic the area was characterized by the presence of small rural settlements alongside permanently inhabited villages. Around the end of the 19th century these mountains, like many others in the Italian peninsula, appeared quite barren due to extensive deforestation. Ligurian Prealps had an important role during the Italian resistance movement as refuge and battleground for many partisan units. The Ligurian partisans' deeds on the Prealps were narrated, among others, by Italo Calvino in some of his masterworks. During the post-war period, like in other low-altitude mountain zones of Italy, Ligurian Prealps suffered depopulation and woodland spread in many former cultivated areas which had been abandoned. This increase in woodland is seen as one of the main reasons of the diffusion of wolves in the Ligurian Prealps starting from their refuge areas in the Central Apennine. This later made it possible for the species to recolonize the entire Alpine chain.

== Geology ==
In the Ligurian Prealps are well represented conglomerates and other sedimentary rocks as marls, sandstones, limestones and clay minerals.

== Classification ==
I had gone from the sea – always visible from above a stripe between two green flanks – to the tortuous valleys of the Ligurian Prealps.

— Italo Calvino, The Path to the Nest of Spiders (1947)

According to the SOIUSA Ligurian Prealps are an Alpine subsection classified as it follows:

- Main part = Western Alps
- Major sector = Southwestern Alps
- Alpine section = Ligurian Alps
- Alpine subsection = Ligurian Prealps (Code = I/A-1.I)

== Borders ==
Rotating clockwards, the limits of the Ligurian Prealps are: Colle di Nava (which divides them from the Alpi del Marguareis, the other subsection of the Ligurian Alps), river Tanaro, Cevetta stream, Colle di Cadibona (which divides them from the Apennine Mountains), Lavanestro stream, Savona, Ligurian Sea, Albenga, Arroscia Valley, colle di Nava. The W border of the chain is the Colle di Nava not just according to the SOIUSA, but also for the CAI, as stated in its volume Alpi Liguri (Guida dei Monti d'Italia, 1981).

== Partition ==
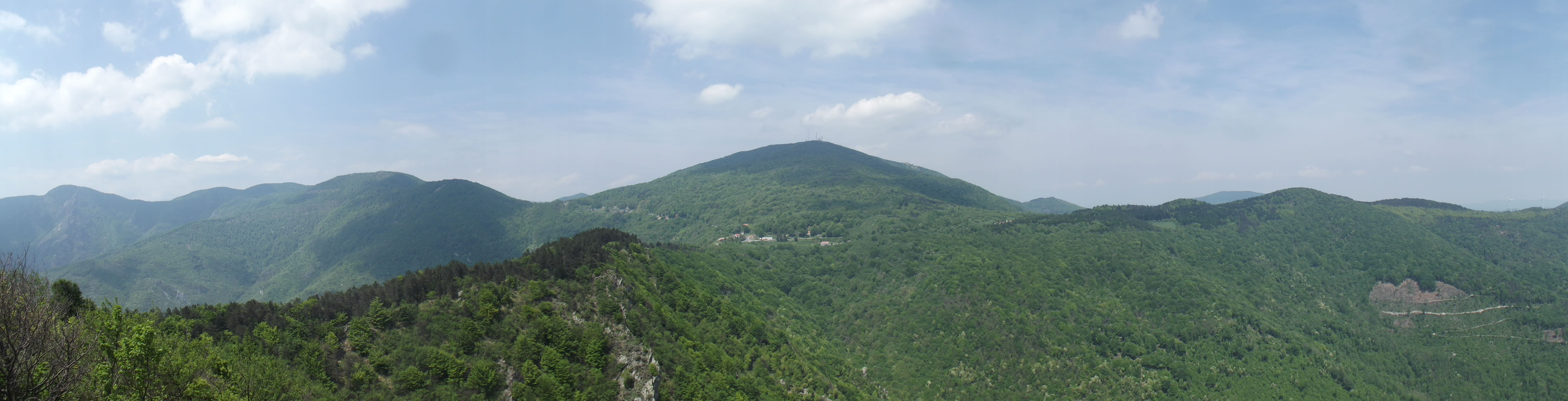
Monte Settepani and its surrounding summits as seen from Bric Gettina.

The specificities of the Prealpi Liguri amidst the Alpine chain, recognized in 2005 by the SOIUSA which considers them as a self-standing subsection, during the first half of the 20th century have been backed by the ligurian alpinist Jacques Guiglia Ligurian Prealps are classified into one Alpine supergroup, three groups and nine sub-groups as it follows:

- Catena Settepani-Carmo-Armetta (A)
  - Gruppo del Monte Settepani (A.1)
    - Costiera Bric Quoggia-Monte Alto or Gruppo del Monte Settepani stricto sensu (A.1.a)
    - Costiera del Monte Settepani or Displuvio Bormida di Pállare – Bormida di Millesimo (A.1.b)
    - Costiera Bric dei Pinei-Rocca Roluta or Displuvio Bormida di Pállare – Bormida di Mállare (A.1.c)
    - Costiera del Bric Gettina or Displuvio Porra – Marémola (A.1.d)
  - Gruppo del Monte Carmo (A.2)
    - Costiera del Monte Carmo or Gruppo del Monte Carmo stricto sensu (A.2.a)
    - Dorsale Spinarda-Sotta or Displuvio Tanaro – Bormida di Millesimo (A.2.b)
  - Gruppo Galero-Armetta (A.3)
    - Costiera Galero-Armetta or Gruppo del Monte Galero e del Monte Armetta stricto sensu (A.3.a)
    - Dorsale del Pizzo Castellino or Displuvio Neva – Pennavaira (A.3.b)
    - Dorsale della Rocca delle Penne or Displuvio Pennavaira – Arroscia (A.3.c)

The colle del Melogno takes apart Gruppo del Monte Settepani and Gruppo del Monte Carmo, while the colle San Bernardo divides the Gruppo del Monte Carmo from the Gruppo Galero-Armetta, the latter being the highest area of the mountain chain.

== Main passes ==
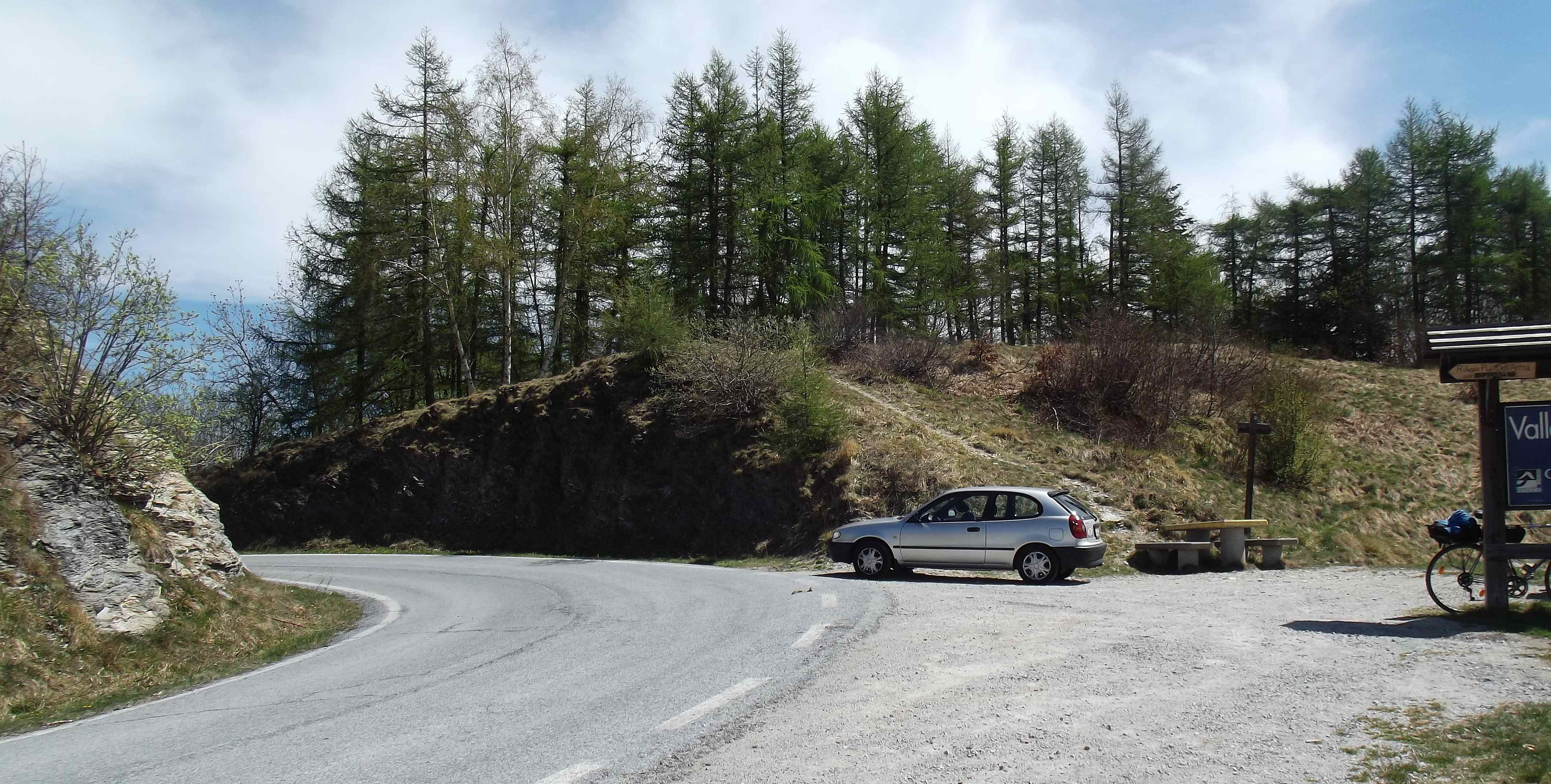
Colle di Caprauna

Some important passes in the Ligurian Prealps are listed below:

- Colle di Cadibona – 459 metres (1,506 ft),
- Giogo di Toirano – 801 metres (2,628 ft),
- Colle Scravaion – 814 metres (2,671 ft),
- Colle di Nava – 934 metres (3,064 ft),
- Colle San Bernardo – 957 metres (3,140 ft),
- Colle del Quazzo – 1,090 metres (3,580 ft),
- Colle del Melogno – 1,027 metres (3,369 ft).

== Main summits ==
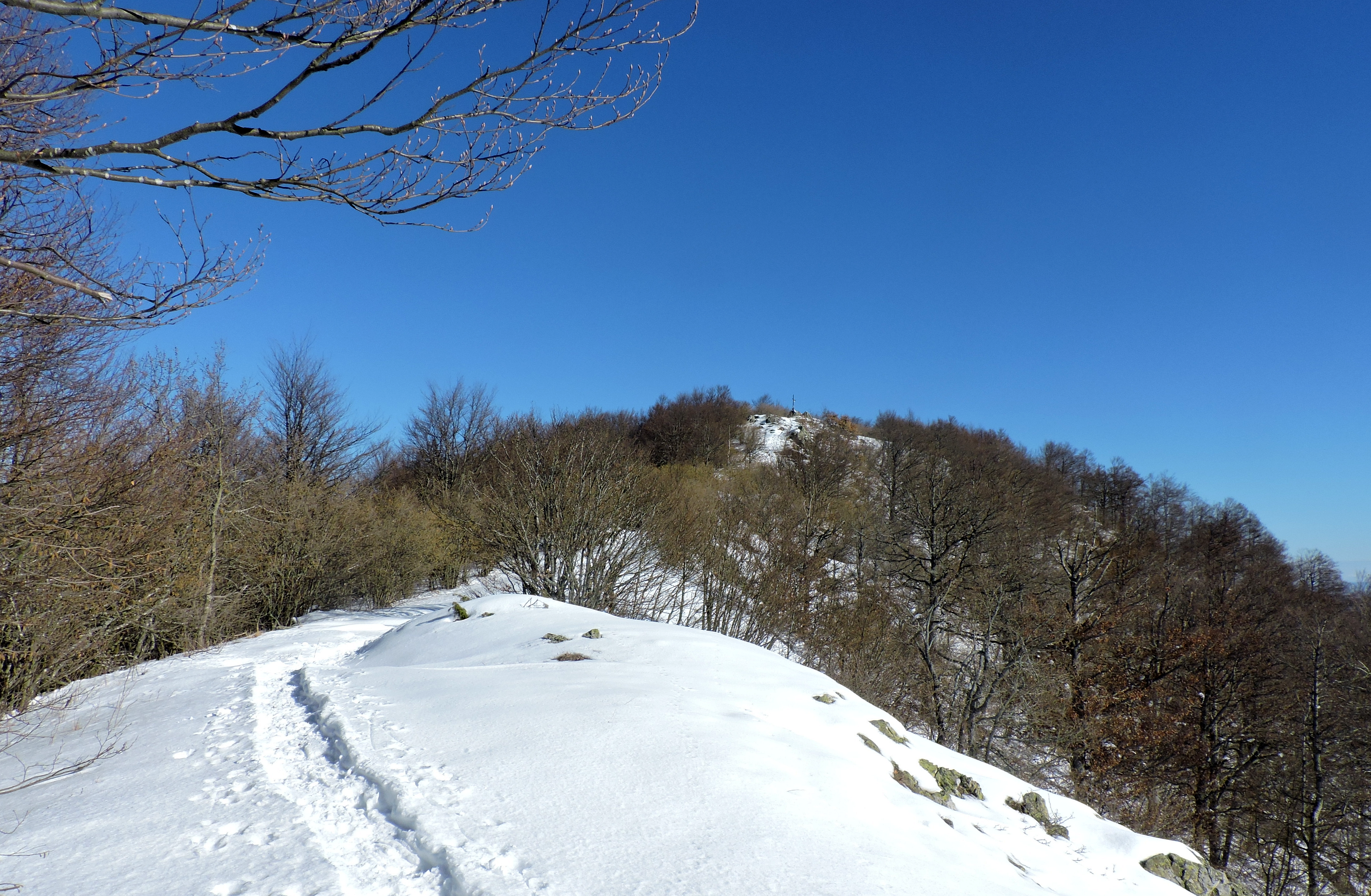
Monte Spinarda

Among the chief summits of the Ligurian Prealps can be listed:

- Monte Armetta – 1,739 metres (5,705 ft),
- Monte Galero – 1,708 metres (5,604 ft),
- Monte della Guardia – 1,658 metres (5,440 ft),
- Rocca delle Penne – 1,501 metres (4,925 ft),
- Monte Carmo di Loano – 1,389 metres (4,557 ft),
- Monte Settepani – 1,386 metres (4,547 ft),
- Monte Spinarda – 1,357 metres (4,452 ft),
- Bric Agnellino – 1,335 metres (4,380 ft),
- Bric Merizzo – 1,275 metres (4,183 ft),
- Monte Cianea – 1,226 metres (4,022 ft),
- Monte Camulera – 1,224 metres (4,016 ft),
- Rocca Barbena – 1,142 metres (3,747 ft),
- Ronco di Maglio – 1,108 metres (3,635 ft),
- Monte Pietra Ardena - 1,103 metres (3,619 ft),
- Monte Peso Grande – 1,092 metres (3,583 ft),
- Monte Alpe – 1,056 metres (3,465 ft),
- Bric Gettina – 1,025 metres (3,363 ft).

== Nature conservation ==
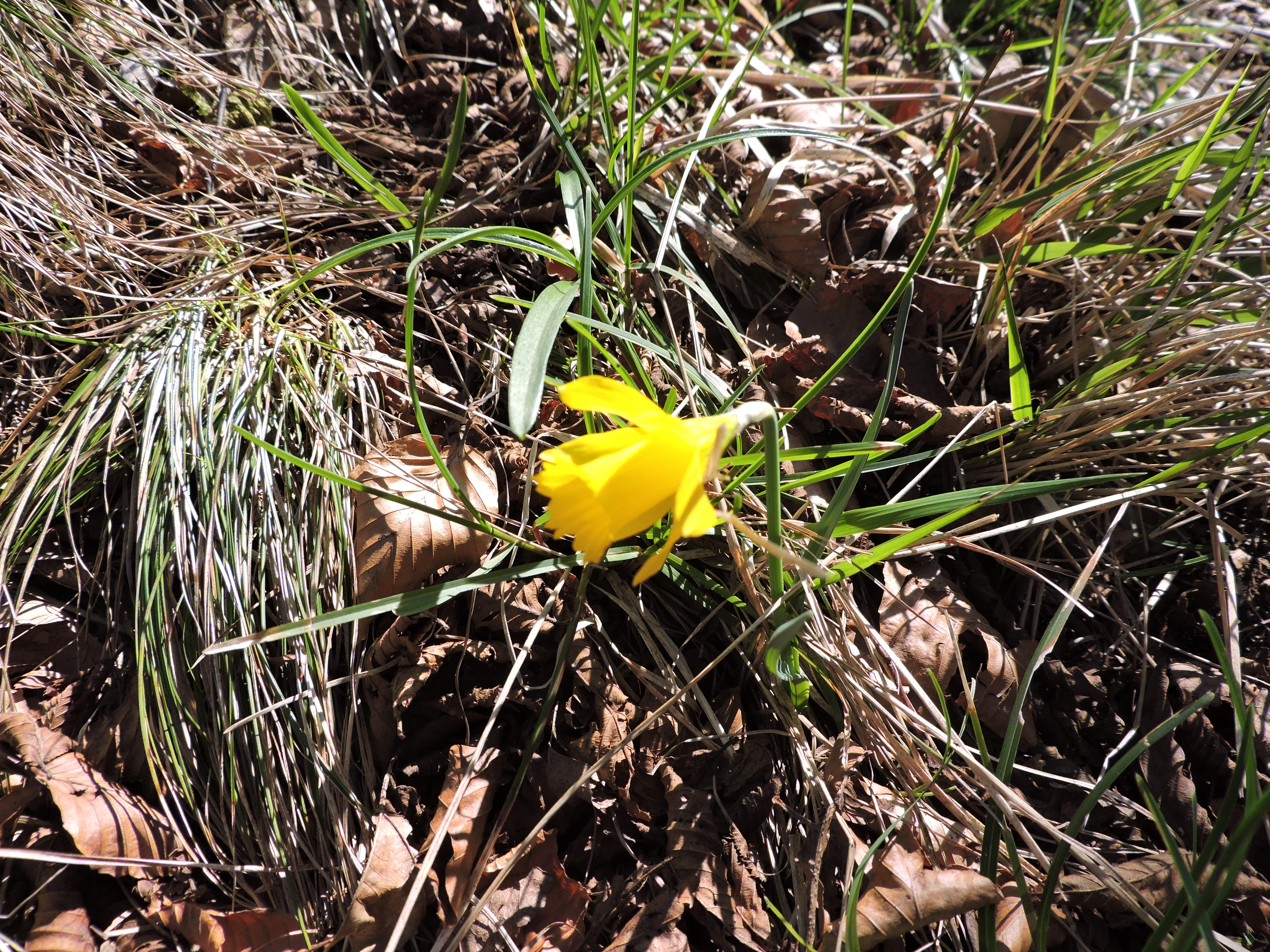
Wild daffodil close to the Rocca Barbena

On the Ligurian Prealps have been established some Natura 2000 SCIs; among them can be remembered Monte Carmo – Monte Settepani (code:IT1323112), Monte Galero (code:IT1323920), Monte Ravinet – Rocca Barbena (code:IT1324011), Monte Spinarda – Rio Nero (code: IT1323014), Bric Zerbi (code:IT1323021), Castell'Ermo – Peso Grande (code:IT1324818) and Ronco di Maglio (code: IT1322216).

== Bibliography ==
- Montagna, Euro; Montaldo, Lorenzo (1981). Alpi Liguri. Guida dei Monti d'Italia (in Italian). San Donato Milanese: CAI-TCI.
- Marazzi, Sergio (2005). Atlante Orografico delle Alpi. SOIUSA (in Italian). Pavone Canavese: Priuli & Verlucca.
