= Monte Settepani =

Mountain in Italy

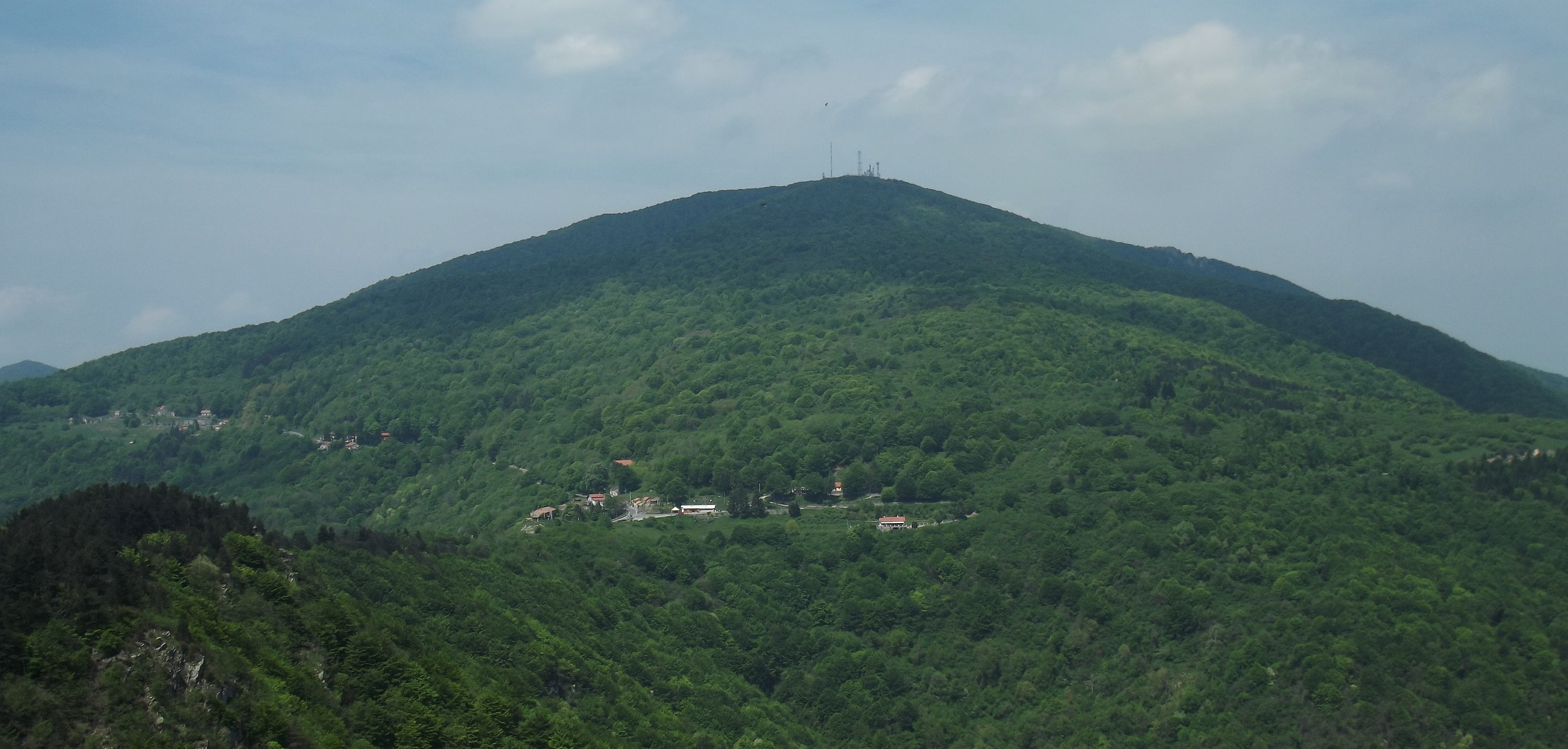
- Monte Settepani from Bric Gettina

Highest point
- Elevation: 1,386 m (4,547 ft)
- Prominence: 358 m (1,175 ft)
- Coordinates: 44°14′42″N 8°11′51″E

Geography
- Location within Alps
- Location: Liguria, Italy
- Parent range: Ligurian Alps

Monte Settepani is 1,386 metres high mountain in Liguria, northern Italy, part of the Ligurian Prealps.

== Geography ==
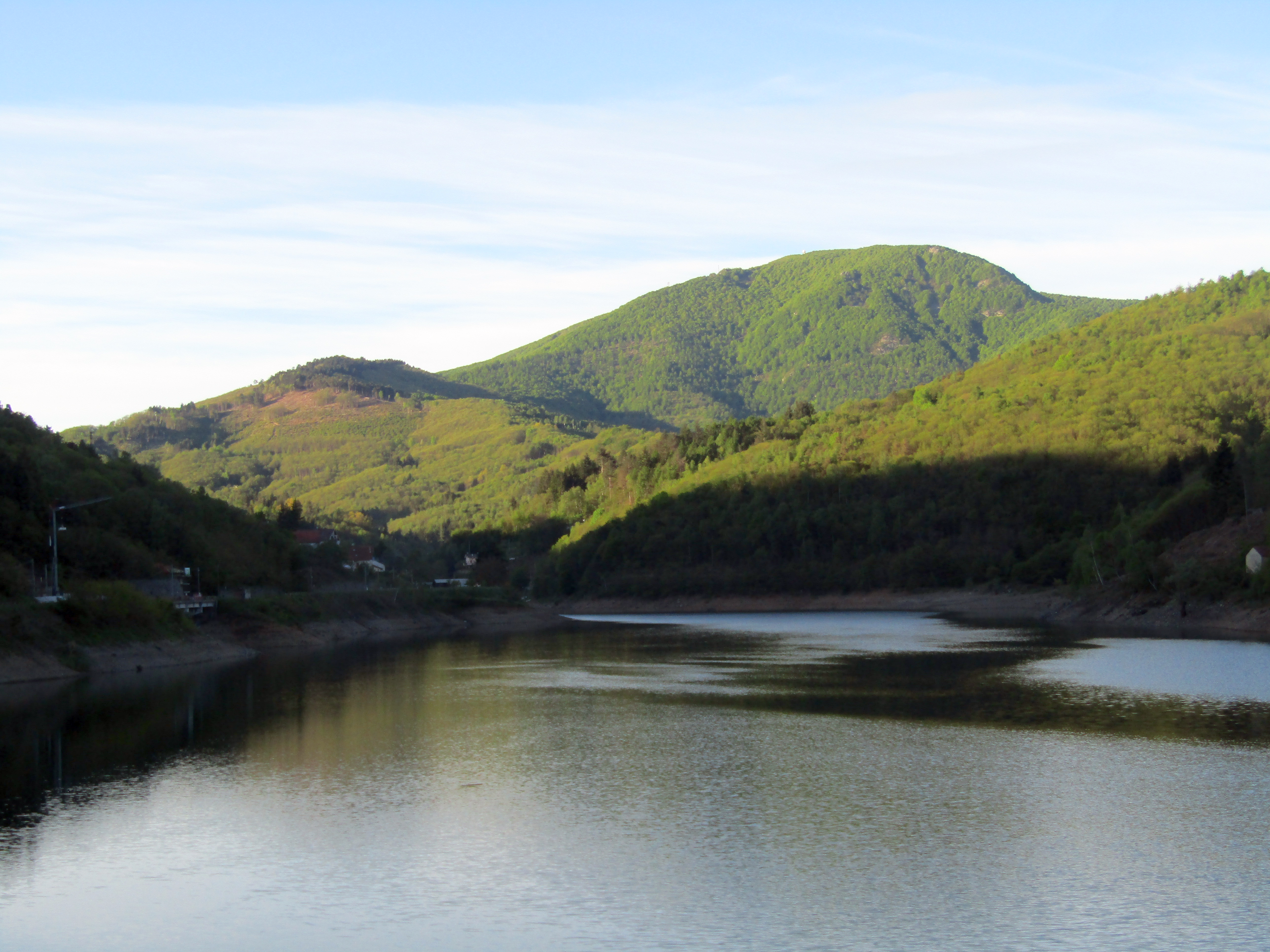
Monte Settepani es seen from the Lake Osiglia

The mountain is located on the main chain of the Alps and its summit stands very close the water divide between Ligurian Sea and River Po basins, on the river Po side. Going South the Colle del Melogno (1,028 m) divides it from Bric Agnellino. On the summit stand some military facilities and a weather radar. The mountain is shared between the territories of five comuni: Osiglia, Bormida, Calizzano, Magliolo and Rialto.

=== SOIUSA classification ===
According to the SOIUSA (International Standardized Mountain Subdivision of the Alps) the mountain can be classified in the following way:

- main part = Western Alps
- major sector = South Western Alps
- section = Ligurian Alps
- subsection = Prealpi Liguri
- supergroup = Catena Settepani-Carmo-Armetta
- group = Gruppo del Monte Settepani
- subgroup = Costiera del Monte Settepani
- code = I/A-1.I-A.1.b

== History ==
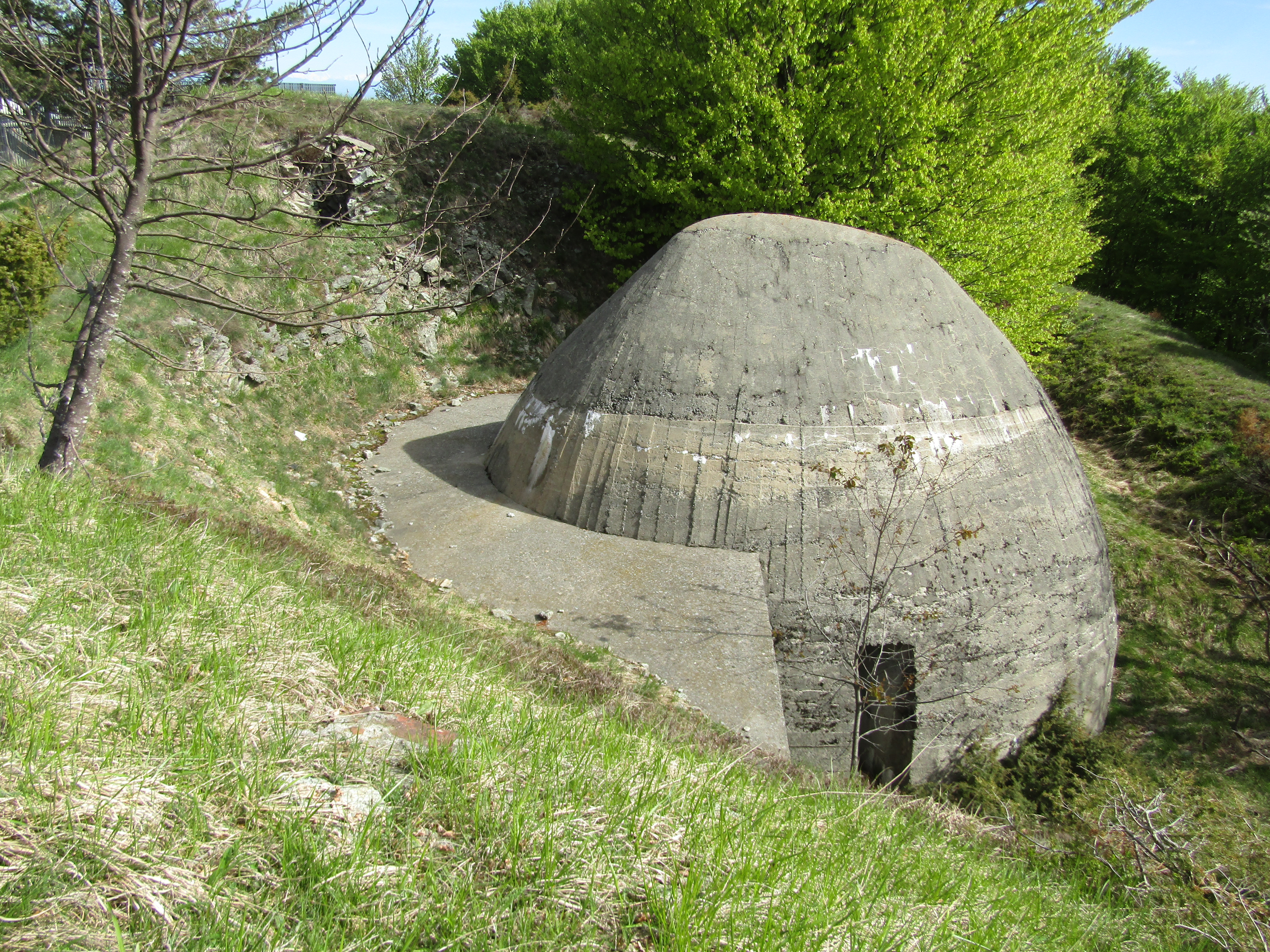
A structure of the abandoned military base

The area of monte Settepani was involved, as well as other neighbouring mountains, in the Italian campaigns of Napoleone Bonaparte.

During the II World War around the Settepani occurred other fights, this time between Italian partisans and nazi-fascist troops.

Monte Settepani could have hosted an underground united States military base, a facility which, according to some sources, could have been also used by the Gladio Organization.

== Access to the summit ==
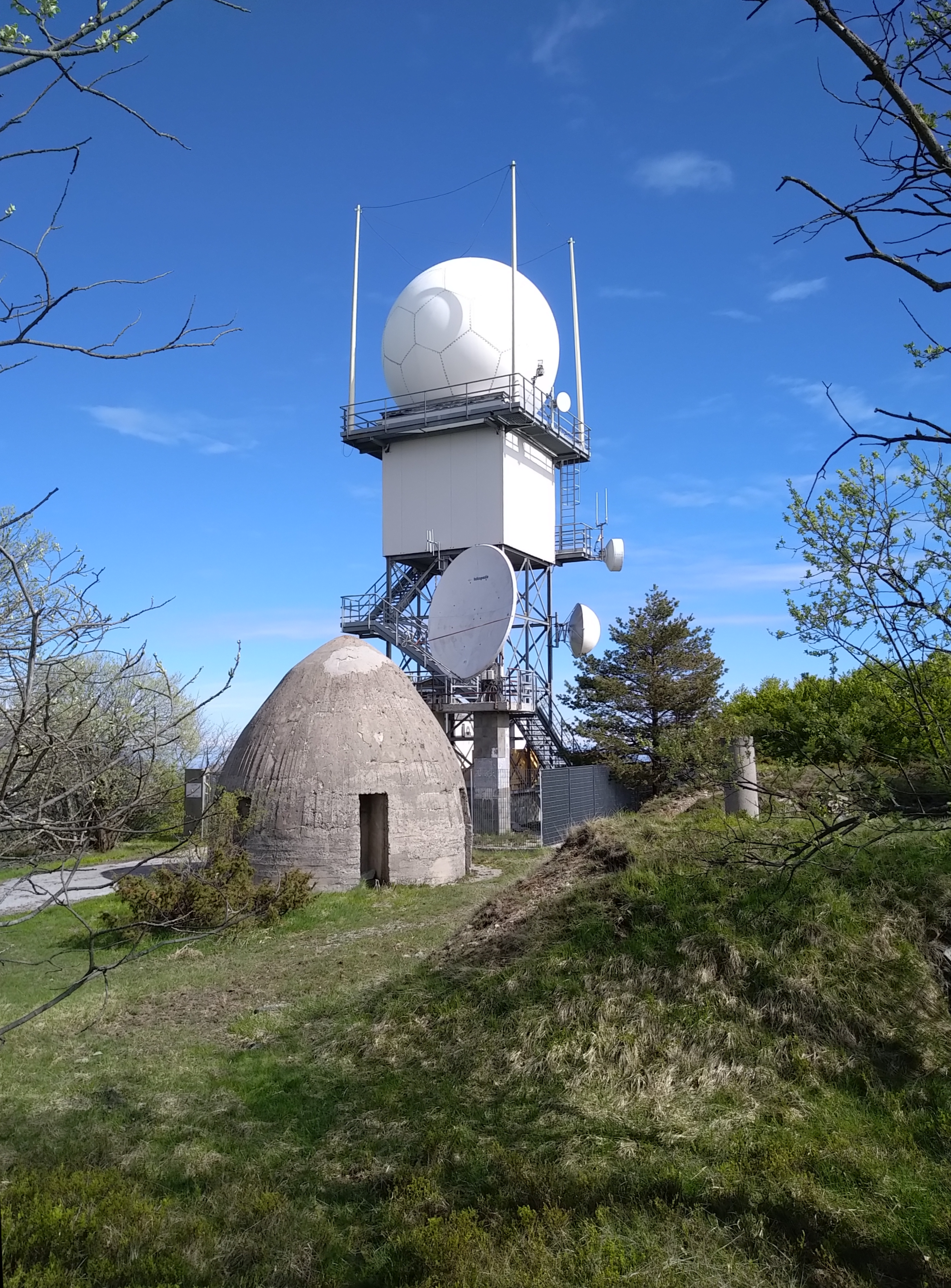
The weather radar close to the summit

The summit of Monte Settepani is reached by a small asphalted road, closed to the general public and built in order to connect the military base on the mountain with the Colle del Melogno national road. The summit can also be reached on foot by some footpath from various starting points as, for instance, the Colla Baltera.

== Nature conservation ==
The mountain and its surrounding area are part of a SIC (Site of Community Importance) called M.Carmo - M.Settepani (code: IT1323112).

== Maps ==
- Cartografia ufficiale italiana scale 1:25.000 and 1:100.000 (Map). Istituto Geografico Militare.
- Carta dei sentieri e stradale scala 1:25.000 n. 26 Bassa val Tanaro Val Bormida e Cebano (Map). Ciriè: Fraternali editore. ISBN 8897465374.
- Carta in scala 1:50.000 n. 15 Albenga, Alassio, Savona (Map). Torino: Istituto Geografico Centrale. 2017. ISBN 8896455588.
