= Pora (river) =

Stream in Liguria, Italy

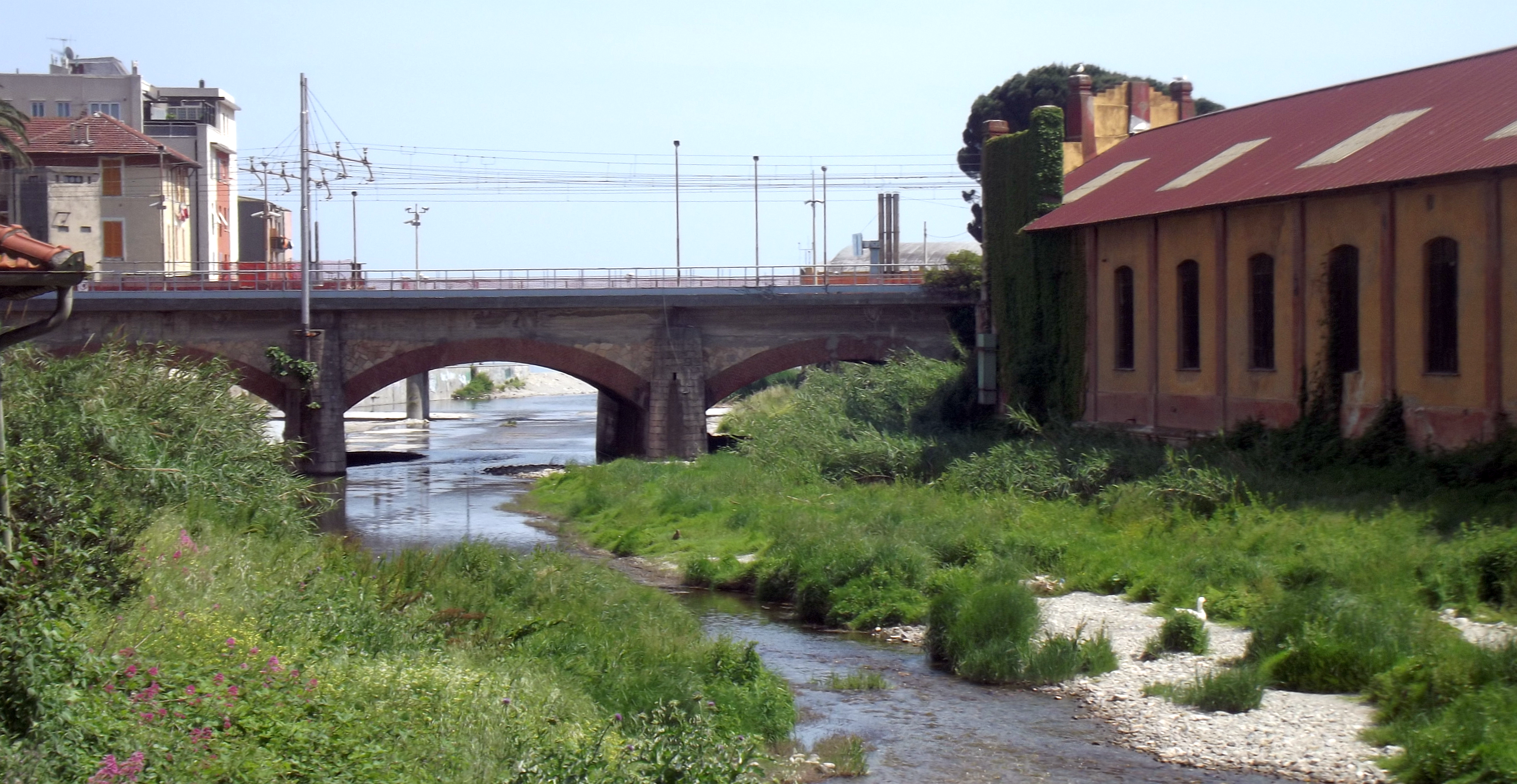
- The Pora near its mouth

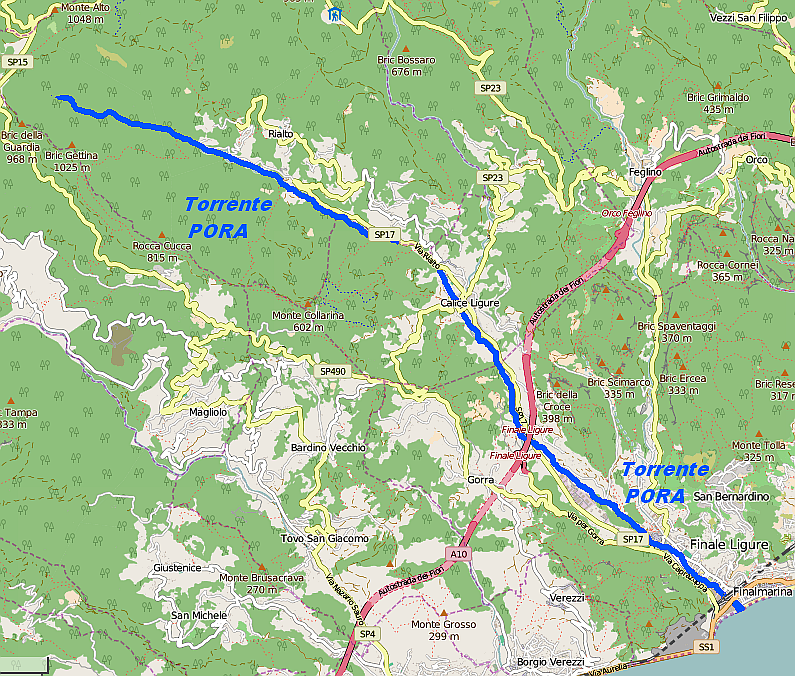

Location
- Country: Italy

Physical characteristics
- Source
  - location: Ligurian Alps
  - elevation: 1,000 m (3,300 ft)
- Mouth: Ligurian Sea
  - location: Finale Ligure (SV)
  - coordinates: 44°10′02″N 8°20′29″E
  - elevation: 0 m (0 ft)
- Length: 15 km (9.3 mi)
- Basin size: 59 km^{2} (23 sq mi)

The Pora (or Porra) is a 15-kilometre (9.3 mi) stream of Liguria (Italy).

== Geography ==
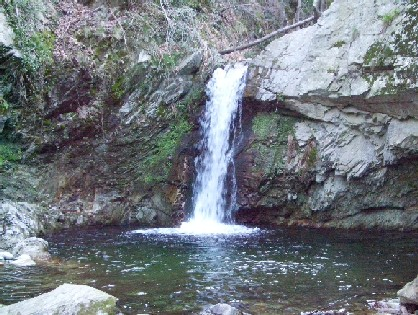
The stream near Rialto

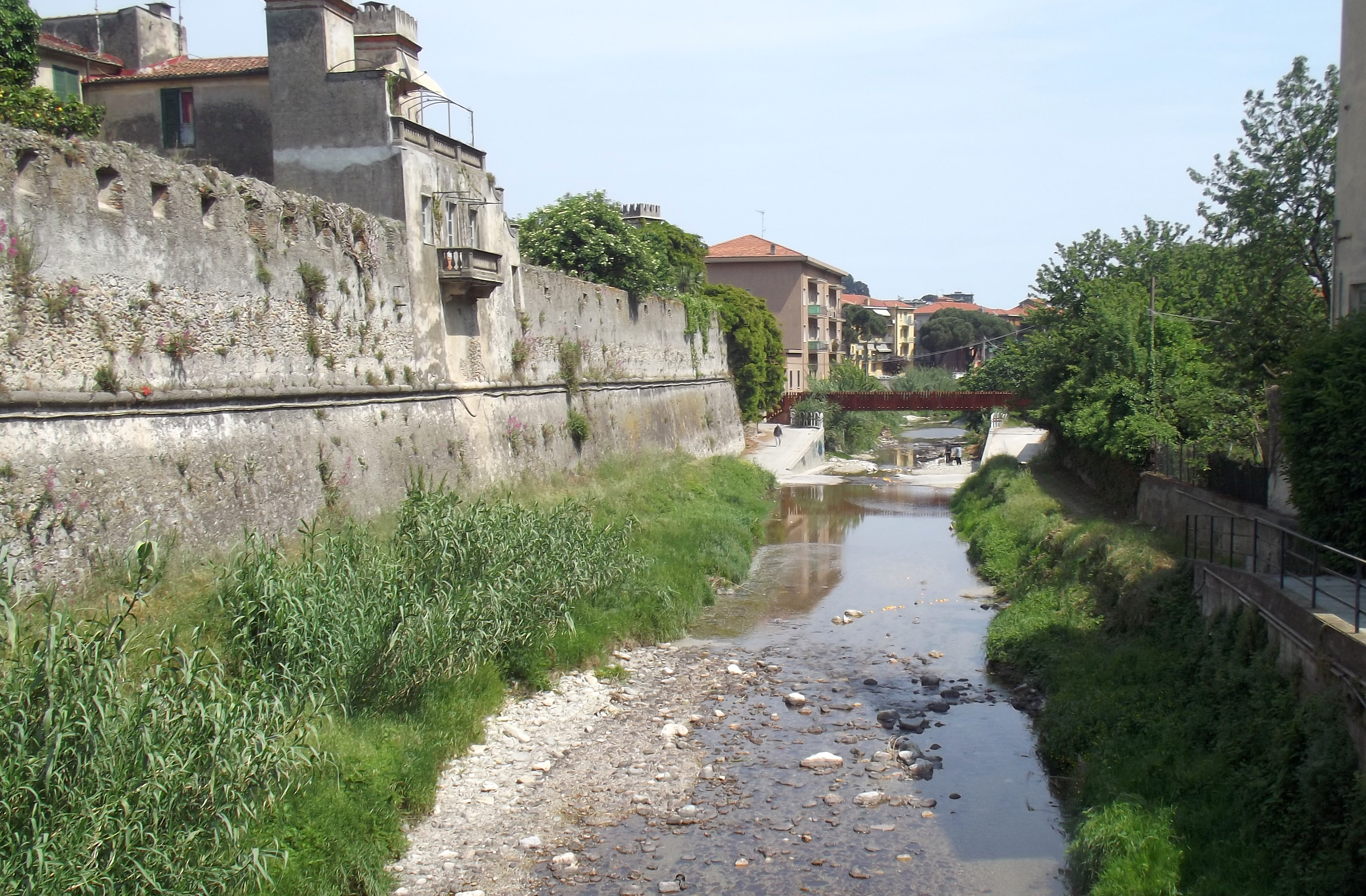
The Pora in Finalborgo

The river rises at around 1000 m in the Ligurian Alps, not faraway from Colle del Melogno, at the junction between rio Rivase and Rio Peccione, in the comune of Rialto. Flowing in the Valle Pora it passes through the comune of Calice Ligure, where it receives from left the waters of torrente Carbuta. Heading south-east the Pora reaches Finlaborgo and gets its main tributary, torrente Aquila; a couple of km downstream it ends its course in the Ligurian Sea, after being crossed by the Genoa–Ventimiglia railway and the Aurelia national road.

Pora basin (59 km2) is totally included in the Province of Savona

=== Main tributaries ===
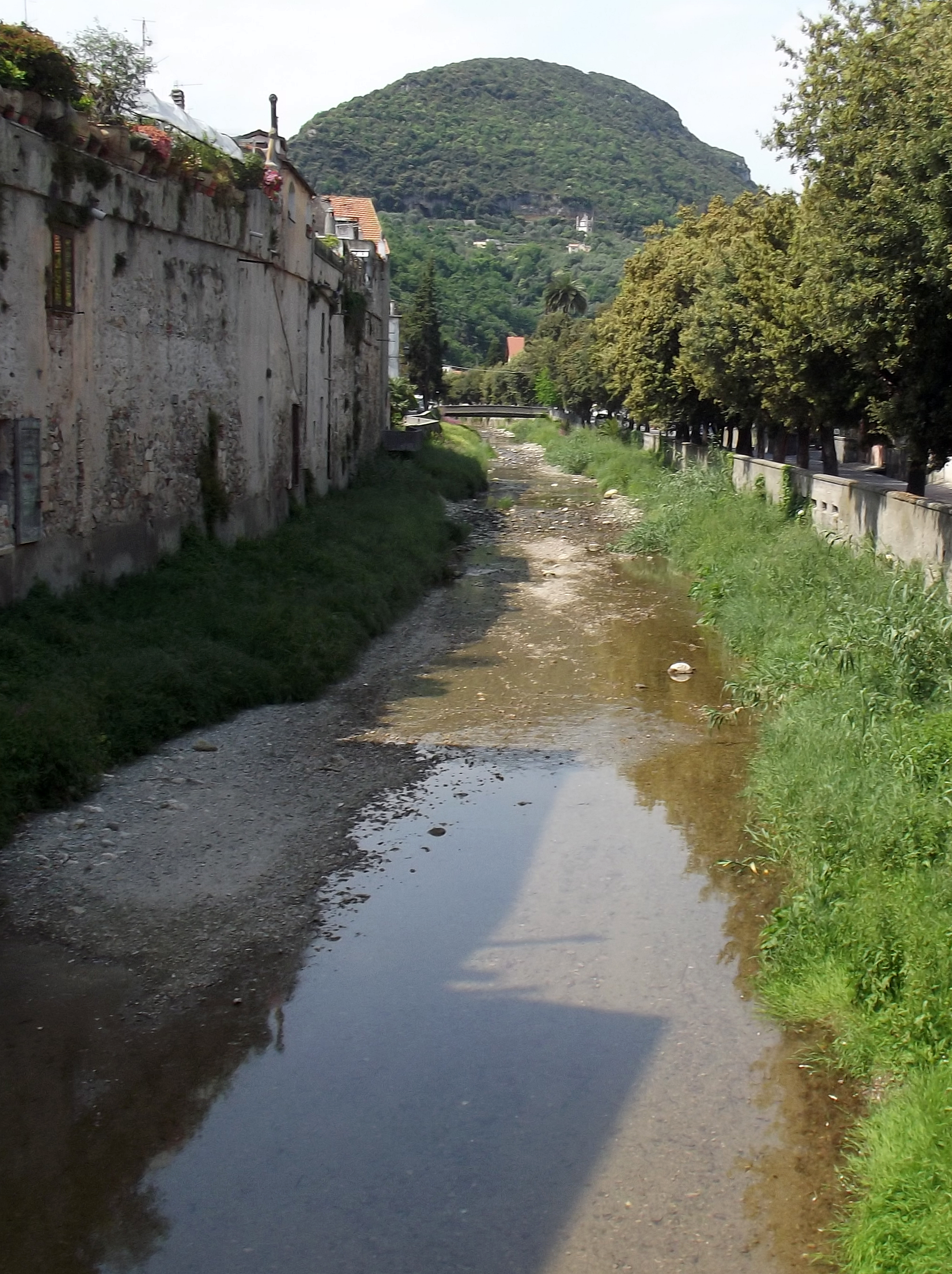
Torrente Aquila.

- Left hand:
  - Torrente Carbuta (watershed 6 km2): it comes from Pian dei Corsi and enters the Pora in Calice Ligure;
  - Torrente Aquila (watershed 21 km2): from Monte Alto (956 m) in heads South and crosses the comune of Orco Feglino joining the Pora in Finalborgo;
- Right hand:
  - Rio Ravin: comes from the SE slopes of Bric Gettina;
  - Rio Molino.

== See also ==
- List of rivers of Italy
