= Bric Gettina =

Mountain in Italy

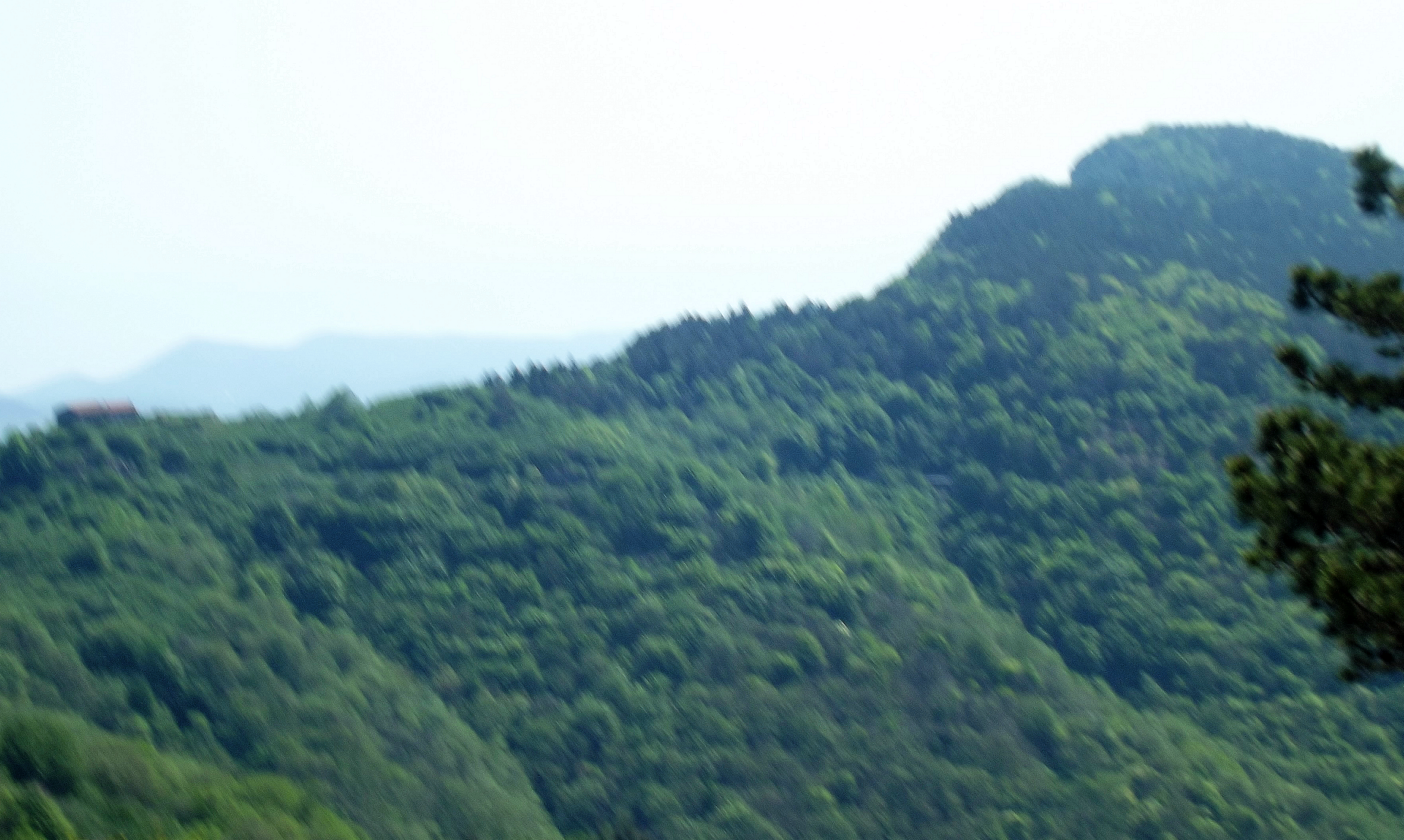
- The mountain seen from Colle del Melogno

Highest point
- Elevation: 1,025 m (3,363 ft)
- Prominence: 126 m (413 ft)
- Coordinates: 44°13′26.4″N 08°13′33.6″E

Geography
- Location within Alps
- Location: Liguria, Italy
- Parent range: Ligurian Alps

Climbing
- First ascent: ancestral
- Easiest route: South-East ridge

Bric Gettina is a 1025 metres high mountain in the Ligurian Prealps (part of the Ligurian Alps) in Italy.

== Geography ==
The mountain is located in the province of Savona, in Liguria. In the SOIUSA (International Standardized Mountain Subdivision of the Alps) it gives the name to the Costiera del Bric Gettina, a long ridge which, starting from the main chain of the Alps at monte Settepani, heads south-east towards the Ligurian Sea, dividing the valleys Pora and Maremola.

== History ==
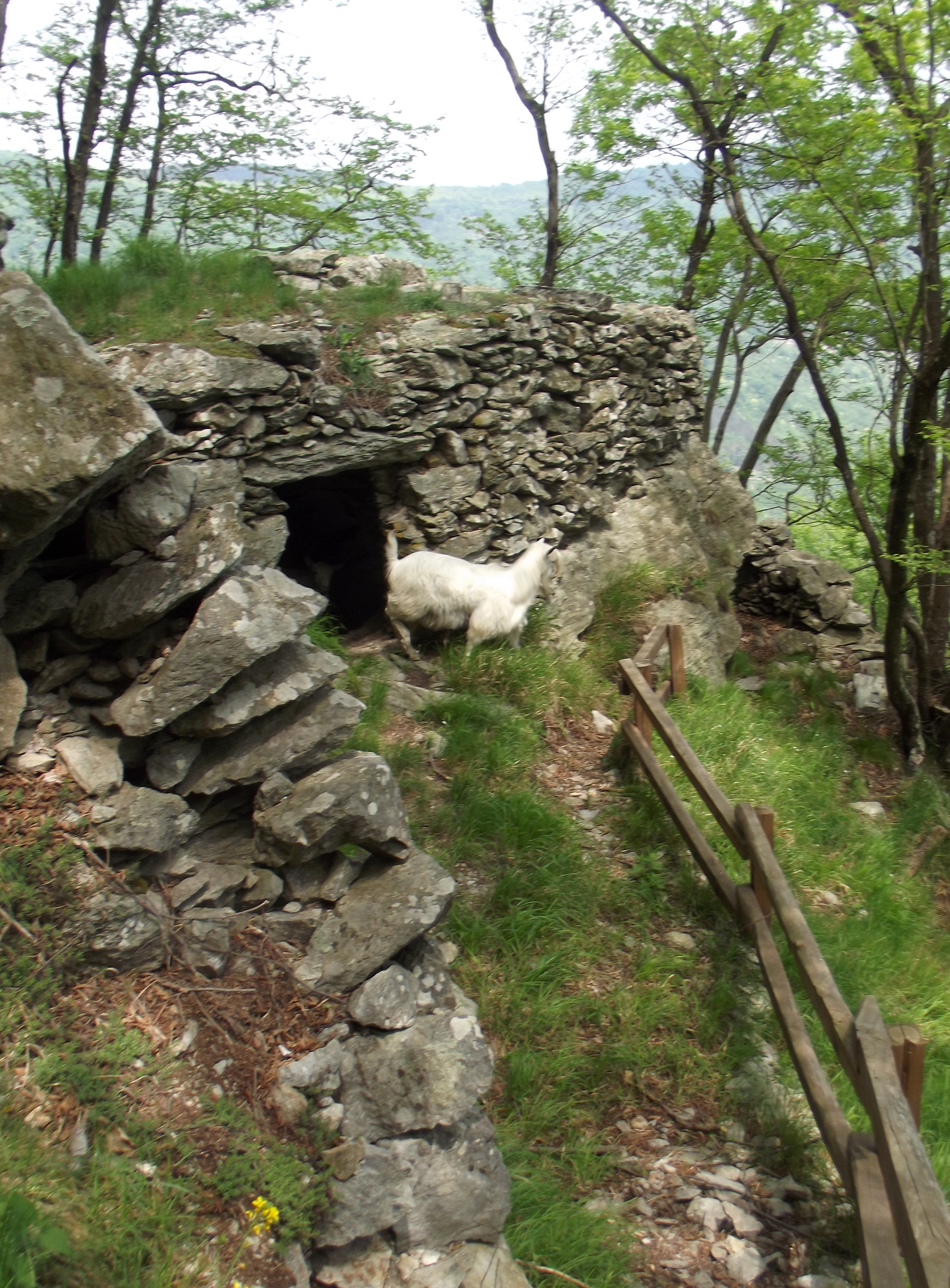
The old mines

On the slopes of Bric Gettina looking towards Pora Valley during the Renaissance period some silver mines have been exploited. On the site are now visible some tunnels and the remains of buildings devoted to first processing of the mineral and sheltering of miners.

== Access to the summit ==
The summit of Bric Gettina can be accessed following unmarked tracks departing from the footpath connecting Casa del Mago and the former silver mines.
