= Rocca delle Penne =

Mountain in Italy

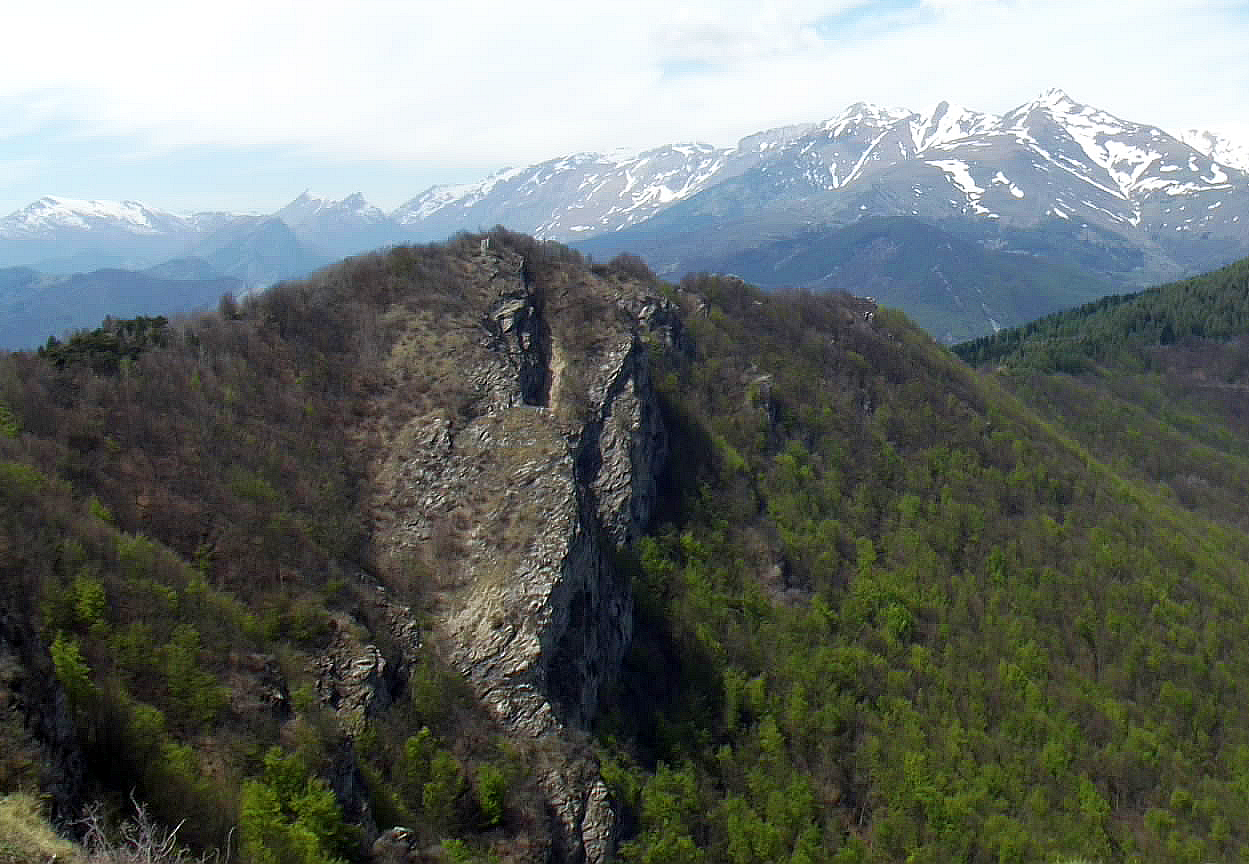
- The mountain seen from Rocca Tramontina

Highest point
- Elevation: 1,501 m (4,925 ft)
- Prominence: 122 m (400 ft)
- Coordinates: 44°06′18.8″N 07°55′56.1″E

Naming
- English translation: Feathers' cliff
- Language of name: Italian

Geography
- Location within Alps
- Location: Liguria/Piedmont, Italy
- Parent range: Ligurian Alps

Climbing
- First ascent: ancestral
- Easiest route: from Colle di Caprauna

Rocca delle Penne is a 1501 metres high mountain in the Ligurian Prealps (part of the Ligurian Alps) in Italy.

== Geography ==
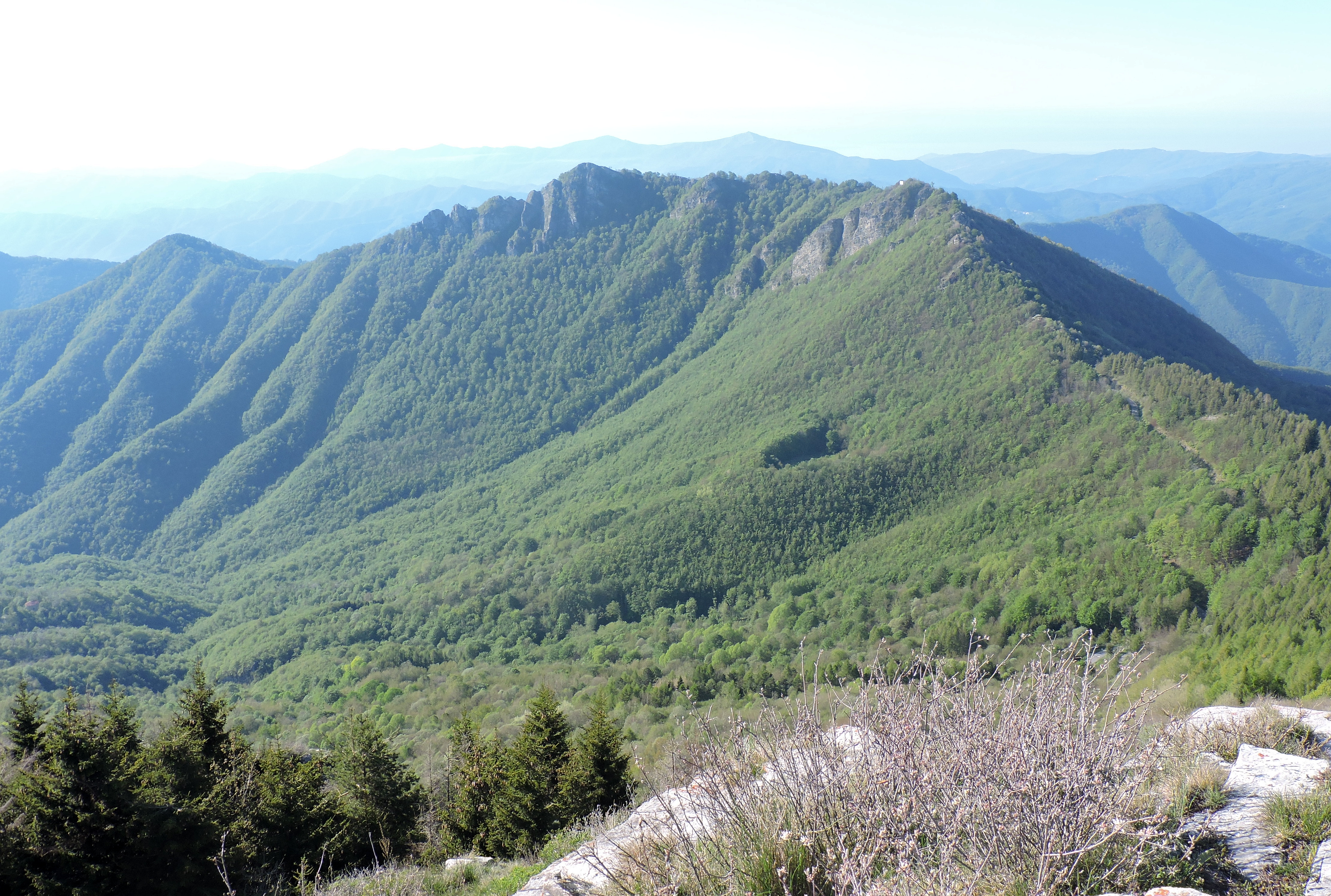
The mountain seen from Monte della Guardia

The mountain is located between the province of Imperia, in Liguria, and the province of Cuneo, in Piedmont. In the SOIUSA (International Standardized Mountain Subdivision of the Alps) it gives the name to the Dorsale della Rocca delle Penne, a ridge starting from the main chain of the Alps at monte della Guardia which, heading south-east, divides the valleys Arroscia and Pennaviare/Neva. The mountain is divided by monte della Guardia by the Caprauna pass (1379 m) and from the nearby rocca Tramontina (1495 m) by a saddle at 1470 m.

== Access to the summit ==
The summit of Rocca della Penna can be accessed following unmarked traks on the ridge connecting Colle di Caprauna and rocca Tramontina.
