= Monte Carmo di Loano =

Mountain in Italy

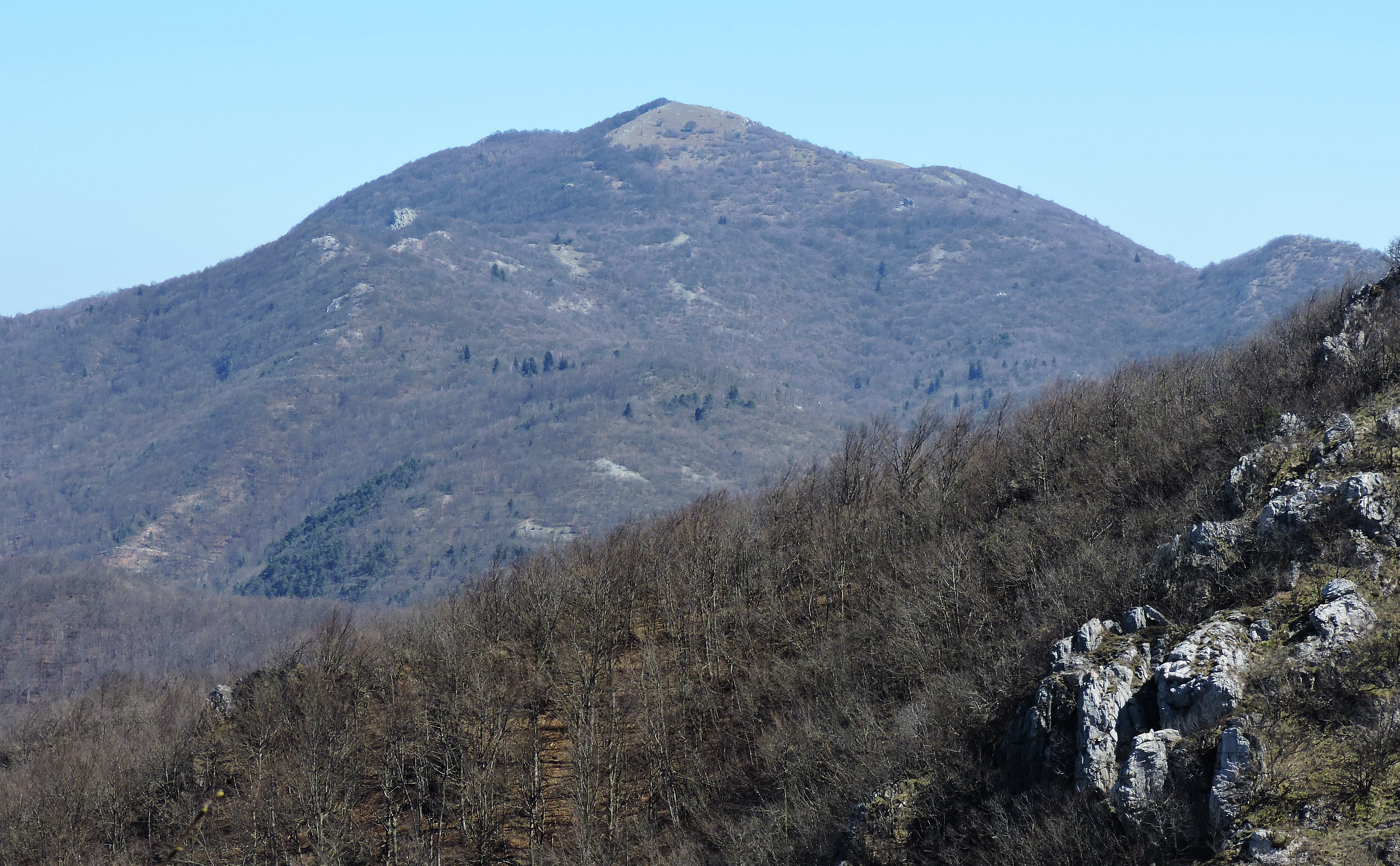

Highest point
- Elevation: 1,389 m (4,557 ft)
- Prominence: 588 m
- Isolation: 13.94 km (8.66 mi)
- Coordinates: 44°10′39″N 8°11′19″E

Geography
- Location within Alps
- Location: Liguria, Italy
- Parent range: Ligurian Alps

Monte Carmo di Loano is a mountain in Liguria, northern Italy, part of the Ligurian Prealps. It is located in the province of Savona. It lies at an altitude of 1389 metres.

== SOIUSA classification ==
According to the SOIUSA (International Standardized Mountain Subdivision of the Alps) the mountain can be classified in the following way:

- main part = Western Alps
- major sector = South Western Alps
- section = Ligurian Alps
- subsection = Prealpi Liguri
- supergroup = Catena Settepani-Carmo-Armetta
- group = Gruppo del Monte Carmo
- subgroup = Costiera del Monte Carmo
- code = I/A-1.I-A.2.a

== Nature conservation ==
The mountain and its surrounding area are part of a SIC (Site of Community Importance) called M.Carmo - M.Settepani (code: IT1323112).

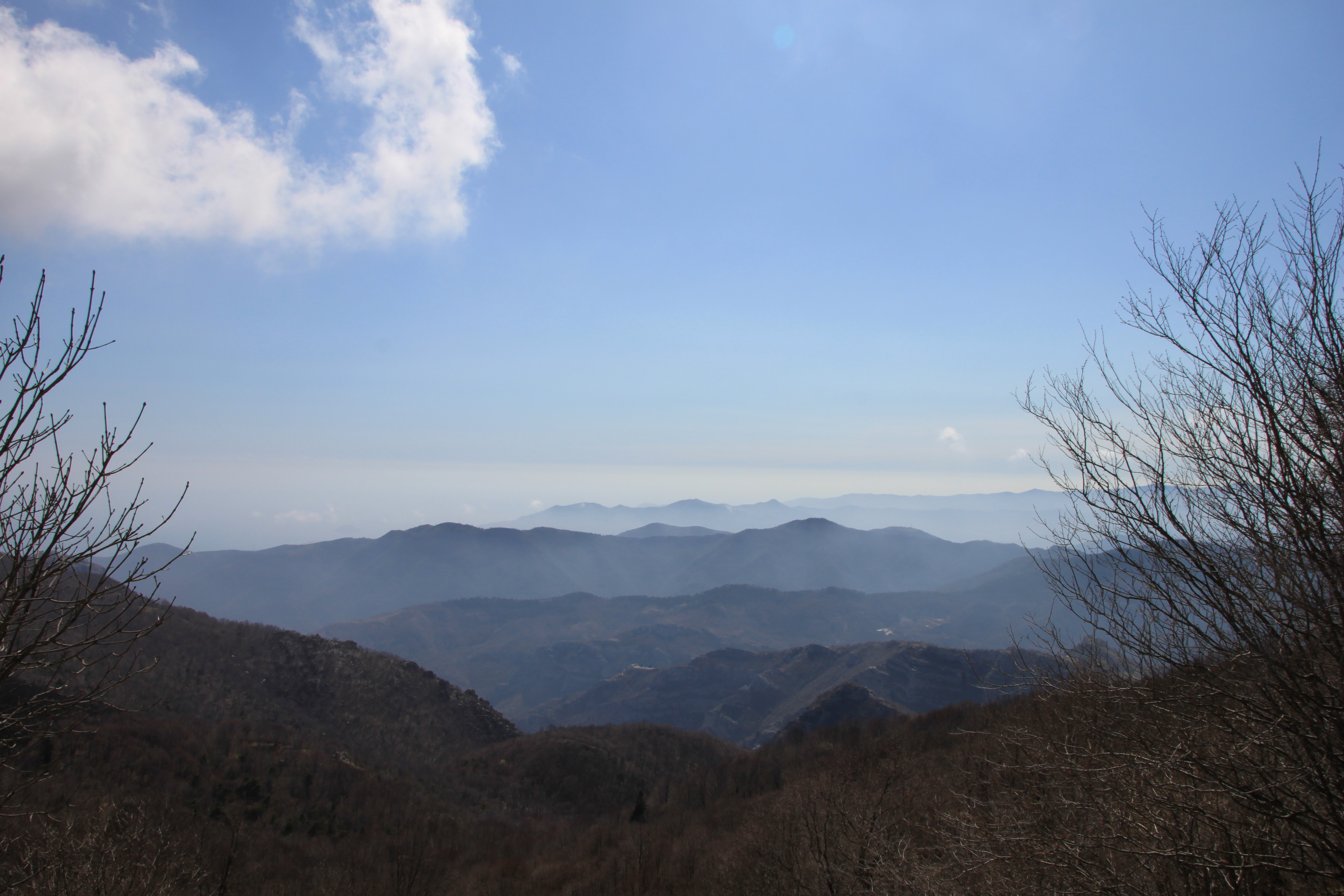
View from Monte Carmo (1)

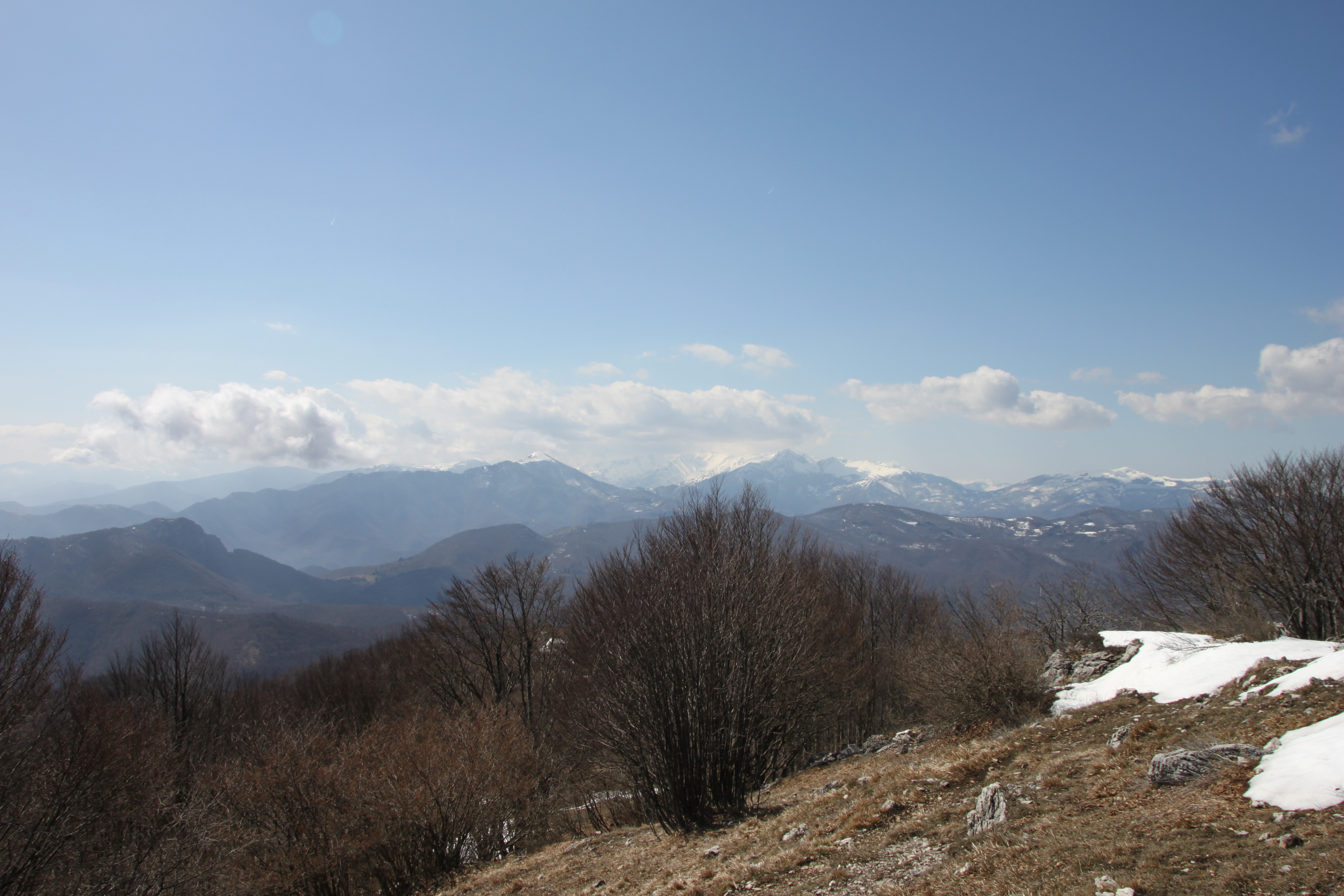
View from Monte Carmo (2)

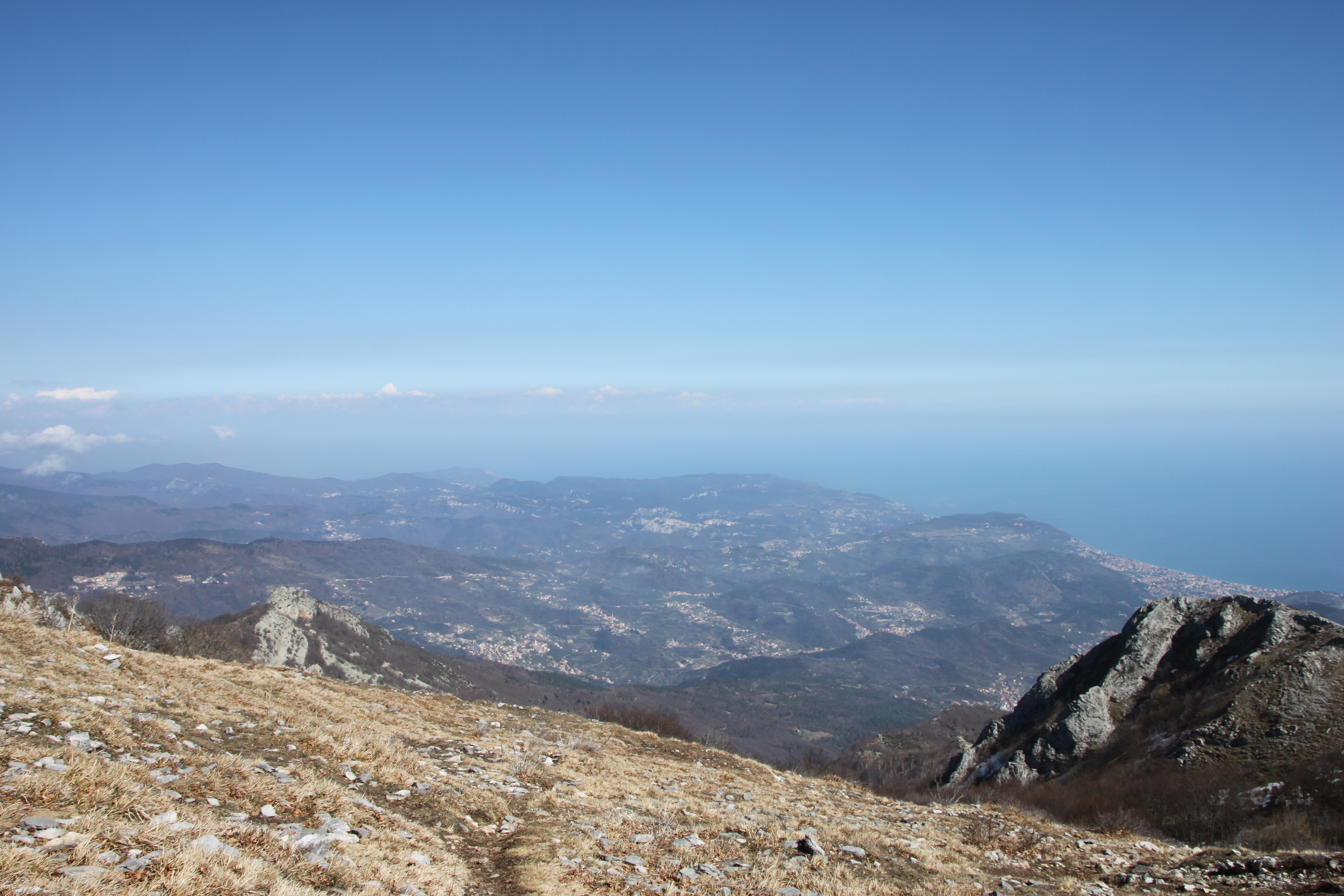
View from Monte Carmo (3)

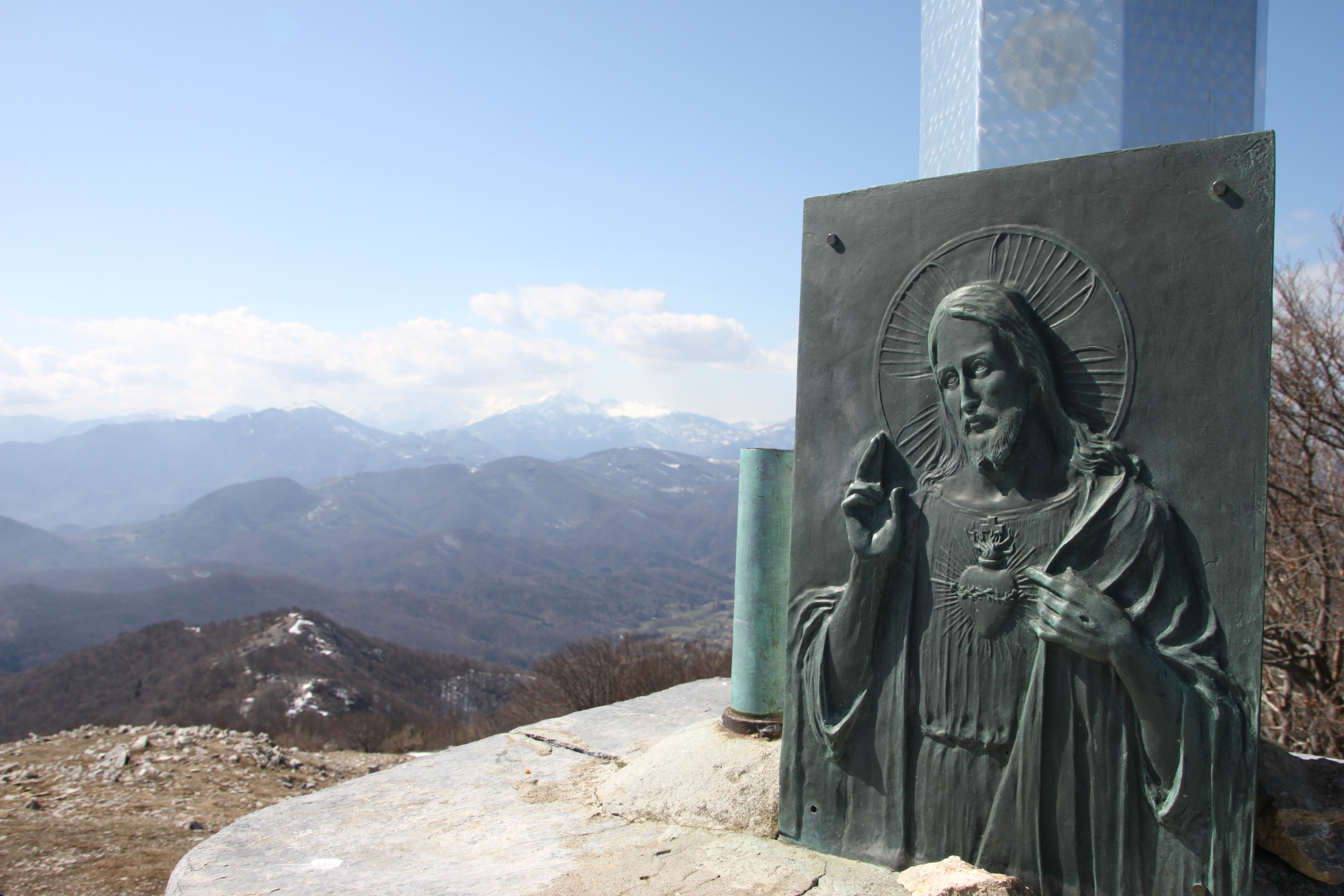
Summit cross base
