= Bric Agnellino =

Mountain in Italy

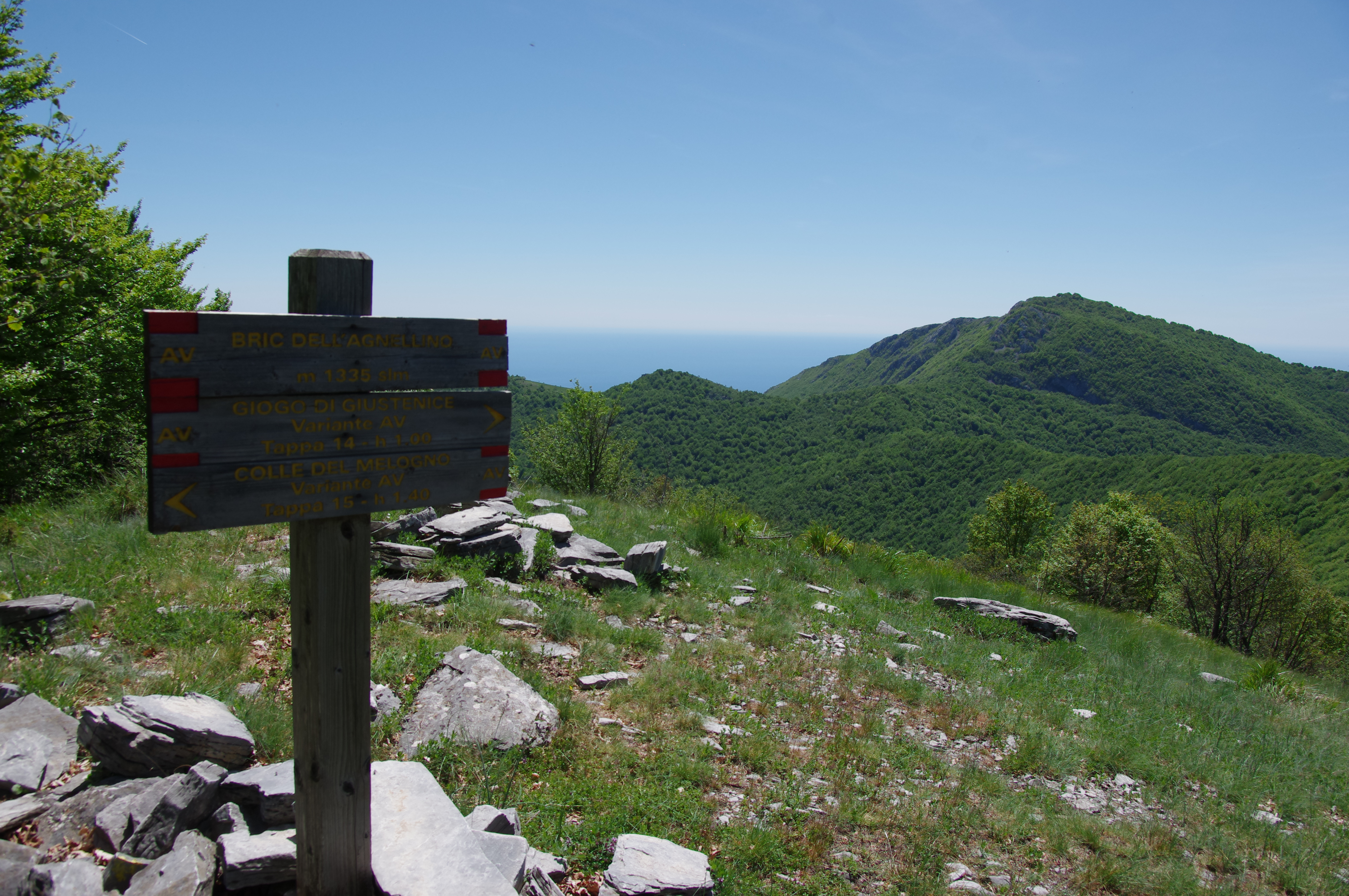
- View from Bric Agnellino

Highest point
- Elevation: 1,335 m (4,380 ft)
- Coordinates: 44°11′58″N 8°10′35″E

Geography
- Location within Alps
- Location: Liguria, Italy
- Parent range: Ligurian Alps

Bric Agnellino is a mountain in Liguria, northern Italy, part of the Ligurian Prealps.

== Geography ==
Bric Agnellino is located west of Colle di Cadibona in the province of Savona. It has an elevation of 1,335 metres. The mountain is the tripoint where the comuni of Magliolo, Giustenice and Bardineto meet.

=== Hiking ===
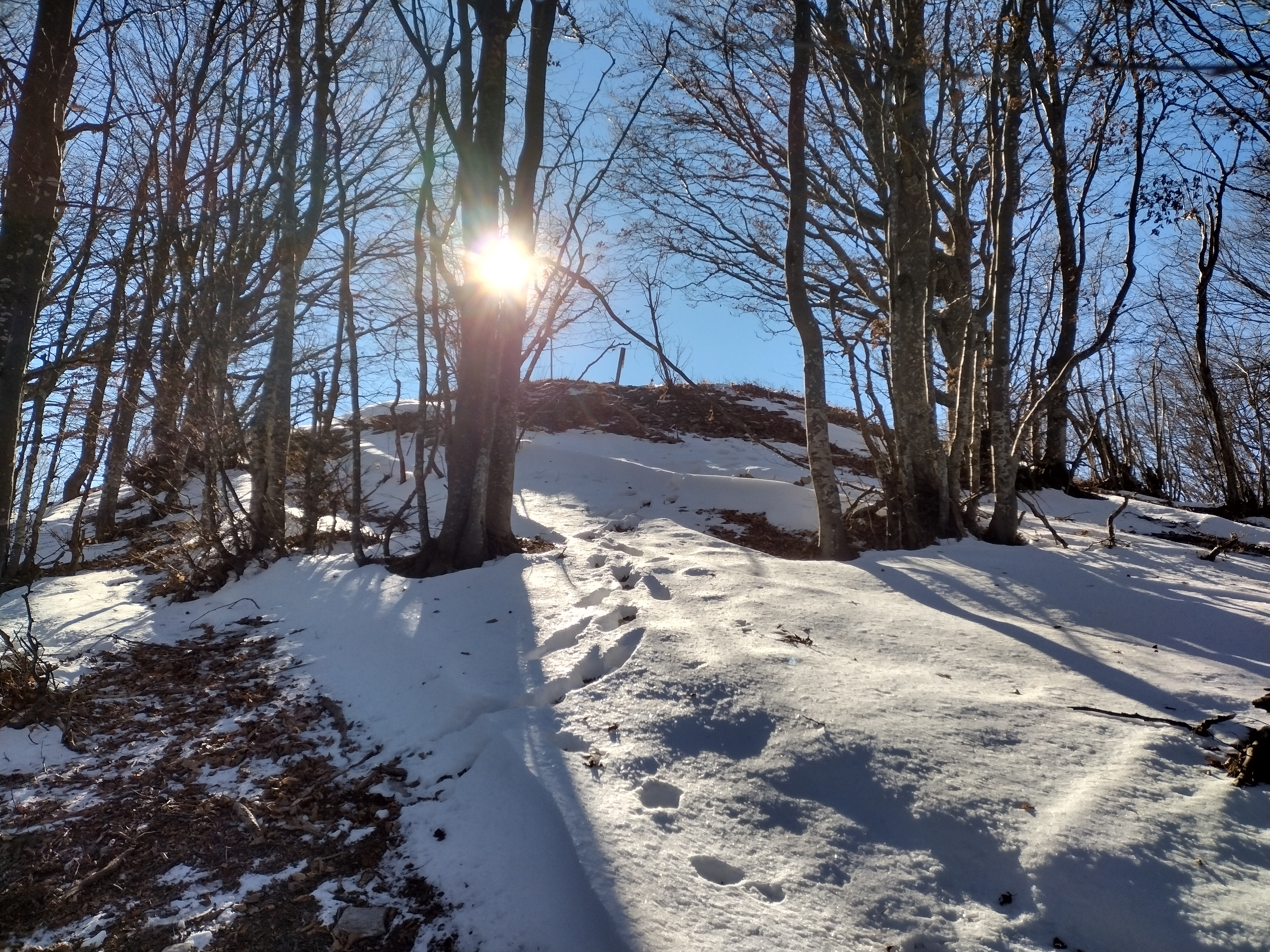
La cima del monte a fine novembre

The summit ca be easily reached with a diversion from the Alta Via dei Monti Liguri, starting either from the Giogo di Giustenice or from Colle del Melogno.

== Climbing ==
From some year is available a via ferrata named Ferrata degli Artisti that follows the Balzi Rossi ridge (from the reddish rocks dominating there.
