= Guida dei Monti d'Italia =

Series of mountaineering guidebooks

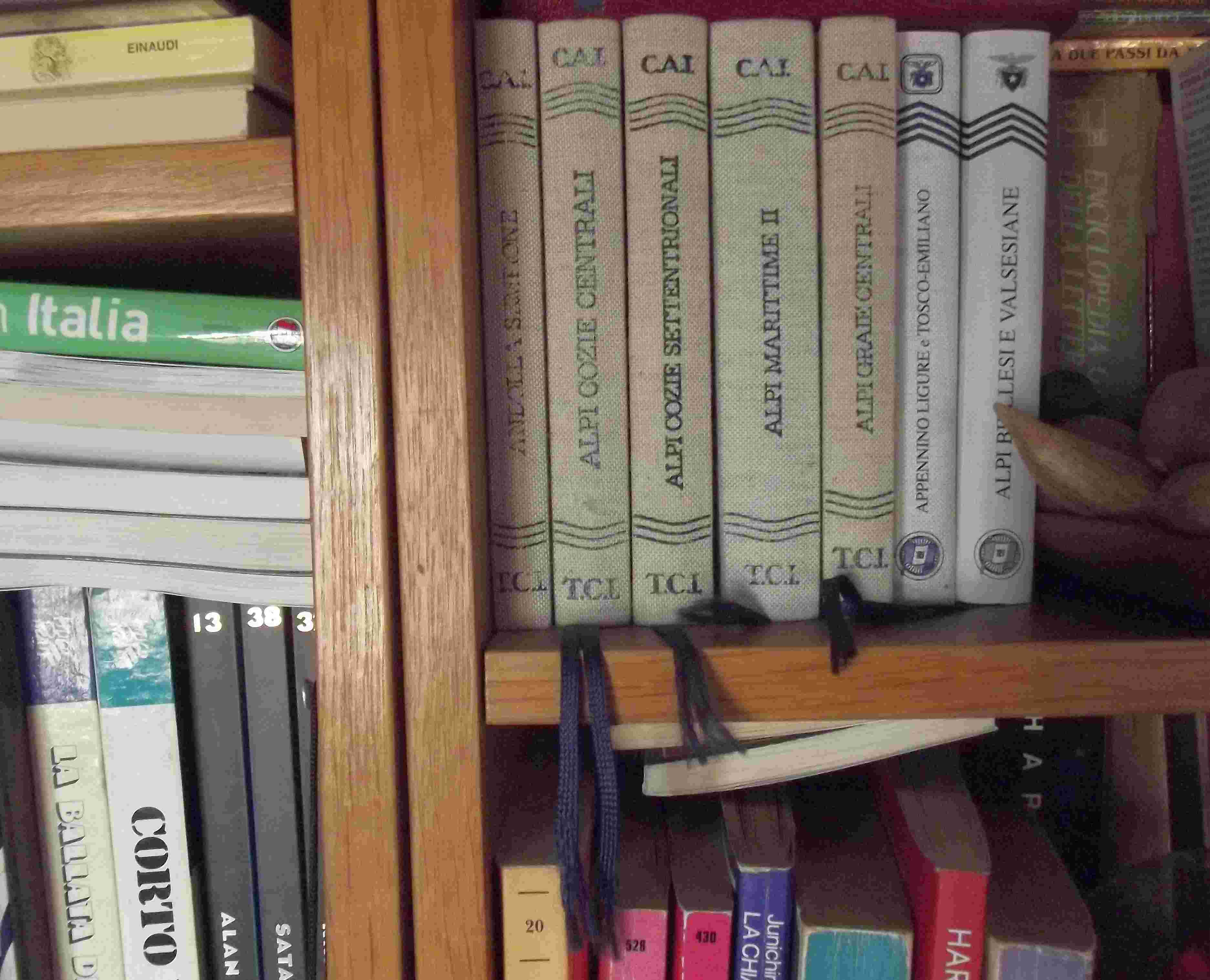
- Some issues of the series on a private bookshelf.
- Country: Italy
- Language: Italian
- Discipline: Mountaineering books
- Publisher: Club Alpino Italiano / Touring Club Italiano
- Published: 1908 - 2013
- No. of books: 12 (1st series) + 63 (2nd series)
- Website: Coedizioni CAI/Touring Club Italiano - Guida Monti d'Italia

The Guida dei monti d'Italia (in English Guidebook to the Italian mountains) is a series of guidebooks published in Italy by the Club Alpino Italiano (CAI) along with Touring Club Italiano (TCI) in two periods, the first from 1908 to 1932 and the second from 1934 to 2013.

== History ==
Drafting and writing the guidebooks involved a much editing and many on-site inspections, and the series soon became a reference work both for amateurs and professional alpinists. The serie as a whole was considered monumental, and the novelist Dino Buzzati defined it an arduous and remarkable achievement. The "Guida dei monti d'Italia" is the best example in Italy of a systematic alpinistic guidebook or, in other words, a work describing, as much as possible, all the features and the routes of the mountain groups described in its volumes. In the early 2000s the death of the alpinist Gino Buscaini, who coordinated for a long time the publishing activities, and the resignement of his wife Silvia Metzeltin, who had replaced him for a while, endangered the publication of titles left to complete the coverage of the Italian mountains. Thus in 2007 a group of mountaineering experts addressed an appeal tho the Club Alpino Italiano chairmanship aimed to save the series and to revive it thanks to a new cooperation deal between CAI and TCI. The series was indeed completed with in 2013 with its last volume, Alpi biellesi e valsesiane. Many professionals and enthusiasts in mountainering still own and consult the volumes devoted to the mountain areas of their interest. Some of the older issues of the series nowadays are very difficult to find, and its volumes aren't any more updated.

== Titles of the 1st series ==
Title	Year	Author/s
Le Alpi Marittime	1908	Giovanni Bobba
Alpi Retiche occidentali	1911	Brasca, Silvestri, Balabio e Corti
La Regione dell'Ortler	1915	Aldo Bonacossa
Gruppo della Presanella (fascicolo)	1916	Gualtiero Laeng
Sottogruppo Lares-Carè Alto (fascicolo)	1917	Gualtiero Laeng
Alpi Cozie Settentrionali, Parte I	1923	Eugenio Ferreri
Alpi Cozie Settentrionali, Parte II – Sezione I	1926	Eugenio Ferreri
Alpi Cozie Settentrionali, Parte II – Sezione II	1927	Eugenio Ferreri
Dolomiti di Brenta	1926	Pino Prati]
Dolomiti Orientali	1928	Antonio Berti
Tricorno (fascicolo)	1930	Carlo Chersi
Guida del Gruppo del Montasio (fascicolo)	1932	Vladimiro Dougan e Antonio Marussi

== Titles of the 2nd series ==
Title	Year	Author/s	Nr.	Reprinted	Validity
Alpi Liguri	1981	Euro Montagna e Lorenzo Montaldo	1		Current
Alpi Marittime	1934	Attilio Sabbadini	2		Outdated
Alpi Marittime, vol. I, 2ª ed.	1984	Euro Montagna, Lorenzo Montaldo e Francesco Salesi	2		Current
Alpi Marittime, vol. II, 2ª ed.	1990	Euro Montagna, Lorenzo Montaldo e Francesco Salesi	3		Current
Monte Viso – Alpi Cozie Meridionali	1987	Michelangelo Bruno	4	1998	Current
Monte Viso – Alpi Cozie Meridionali	1987	Michelangelo Bruno	4		Current
Alpi Cozie Centrali	1982	Eugenio Ferreri	5		Current
Alpi Cozie Settentrionali	1985	Roberto Aruga, Pietro Losana e Alberto Re	6		Current
Alpi Graie Meridionali	1980	Giulio Berutto e Lino Fornelli	7		Current
Aggiornamento alla guida del Gran Paradiso, 2ª ed.	1964	Renato Chabod e Piero Falchetti	8		Outdated
Gran Paradiso	1939	Emanuele Andreis, Renato Chabod e Mario C. Santi	8		Outdated
Gran Paradiso / Parco Nazionale, 2ª ed.	1963	Emanuele Andreis, Renato Chabod e Mario C. Santi	8		Outdated
Gran Paradiso / Parco Nazionale, 3ª ed.	1980	Emanuele Andreis, Renato Chabod e Mario C. Santi	8		Current
Emilius Rosa dei Banchi	2005	Giulio Berutto e Lino Fornelli	9		Current
Alpi Graie Centrali	1985	Alessandro Giorgetta	10		Current
Monte Bianco, vol. I	1963	Renato Chabod, Lorenzo Grivel e Silvio Saglio	11	1974	Outdated
Monte Bianco, vol. I	1963	Renato Chabod, Lorenzo Grivel e Silvio Saglio	11		Outdated
Monte Bianco, vol. I	1963	Renato Chabod, Lorenzo Grivel e Silvio Saglio	11	1979	Outdated
Monte Bianco, vol. I, 2ª ed.	1994	Gino Buscaini	11	1995	Current
Monte Bianco, vol. I, 2ª ed.	1994	Gino Buscaini	11		Current
Monte Bianco, vol. II	1968	Renato Chabod, Lorenzo Grivel, Silvio Saglio e Gino Buscaini	12	1983	Current
Monte Bianco, vol. II	1968	Renato Chabod, Lorenzo Grivel, Silvio Saglio e Gino Buscaini	12		Current
Monte Bianco, vol. II	1968	Renato Chabod, Lorenzo Grivel, Silvio Saglio e Gino Buscaini	12	1976	Current
Monte Bianco, vol. II	1968	Renato Chabod, Lorenzo Grivel, Silvio Saglio e Gino Buscaini	12	1980	Current
Alpi Pennine, vol. I	1971	Gino Buscaini	13	1983	Current
Alpi Pennine, vol. I	1971	Gino Buscaini	13		Current
Alpi Pennine, vol. I	1971	Gino Buscaini	13	1979	Current
Alpi Pennine, vol. II	1970	Gino Buscaini	14	2000	Current
Alpi Pennine, vol. II	1970	Gino Buscaini	14		Current
Alpi Pennine, vol. II	1970	Gino Buscaini	14	1987	Current
Monte Rosa	1960	Silvio Saglio e Felice Boffa	15		Outdated
Monte Rosa	1960	Silvio Saglio e Felice Boffa	15	1979	Outdated
Monte Rosa, 2ª ed.	1991	Gino Buscaini	15	1997	Current
Monte Rosa, 2ª ed.	1991	Gino Buscaini	15	2002	Current
Monte Rosa, 2ª ed.	1991	Gino Buscaini	15		Current
Andolla Sempione	1991	Renato Armelloni	17		Current
Alpi Lepontine / Sempione Formazza Vigezzo	1986	Renato Armelloni	18	1998	Current
Alpi Lepontine / Sempione Formazza Vigezzo	1986	Renato Armelloni	18		Current
Prealpi Comasche Varesine Bergamasche	1948	Silvio Saglio	19		Current
Prealpi Comasche Varesine Bergamasche	1948	Silvio Saglio	19		Current
Le Grigne	1937	Silvio Saglio	20		Outdated
Le Grigne, 2ª ed.	1998	Eugenio Pesci	20		Current
Aggiornamento alla Guida delle Alpi Orobie	1969	Ercole Martina	21		Current
Alpi Orobie	1957	Silvio Saglio, Alfredo Corti e Bruno Credaro	21		Current
Mesolcina Spluga / Monti dell'Alto Lario	1999	Alessandro Gogna e Angelo Recalcati	22		Current
Masino Bregaglia Disgrazia, vol. I, 2ª ed.	1977	Aldo Bonacossa e Giovanni Rossi	23		Current
Masino Bregaglia, Disgrazia	1936	Aldo Bonacossa	23		Outdated
Masino Bregaglia Disgrazia, vol. II, 2^ ed	1975	Aldo Bonacossa e Giovanni Rossi	24		Current
Bernina	1959	Silvio Saglio	25		Outdated
Bernina, 2ª ed.	1996	Nemo Canetta e Giuseppe Miotti	25		Current
Prealpi Bresciane	2004	Fausto Camerini	26		Current
Adamello	1954	Silvio Saglio e Gualtiero Laeng	27		Outdated
Adamello, vol. I, 2ª ed.	1984	Pericle Sacchi	27		Current
Adamello, vol. I, 2ª ed.	1984	Pericle Sacchi	27	1991	Current
Aggiornamento alla Guida dell'Adamello	1969	Ercole Martina	27		Outdated
Adamello, vol. II, 2ª ed.	1986	Pericle Sacchi	28		Current
Adamello, vol. II, 2ª ed.	1986	Pericle Sacchi	28	1991	Current
Presanella	1978	Dante Ongari	29		Current
Presanella	1978	Dante Ongari	29	1983	Current
Dolomiti di Brenta	1949	Ettore Castiglioni	30		Outdated
Dolomiti di Brenta, 2ª ed.	1977	Gino Buscaini ed Ettore Castiglioni	30	2000	Current
Dolomiti di Brenta, 2ª ed.	1977	Gino Buscaini ed Ettore Castiglioni	30		Current
Dolomiti di Brenta, 2ª ed.	1977	Gino Buscaini ed Ettore Castiglioni	30	1991	Current
Ortles Cevedale / Parco Nazionale dello Stelvio	1984	Gino Buscaini	31	1997	Current
Ortles Cevedale / Parco Nazionale dello Stelvio	1984	Gino Buscaini	31		Current
Alpi Retiche / Cima di Piazzi – Piz Sesvenna	1997	Renato Armelloni	32		Current
Alpi Venoste Passirie Breonie – dal Resia al Brennero	1939	Silvio Saglio	33		Current
Alpi Aurine / Brennero – Gran Pilastro Vetta d'Italia	2002	Fabio Cammelli e Werner Beikircher	35		Current
Alpi Pusteresi / Vedrette di Ries	1997	Fabio Cammelli e Werner Beikircher	36		Current
Piccole Dolomiti – Pasubio	1978	Gianni Pieropan	37		Current
Lagorai Cima d'Asta	2006	Mario Corradini	38		Current
Sassolungo Catinaccio Latemar	1942	Arturo Tanesini	39		Current
Sassolungo Catinaccio Latemar	1942	Arturo Tanesini	39	1953	Current
Sassolungo / Dolomiti di Gardena e Fassa, 2ª ed.	2001	Ivo Rabanser	40		Current
Odle Puez / Dolomiti tra Gardena e Badia, 2ª ed.	2000	Lorenzo e Pietro Meciani	41		Current
Odle Sella Marmolada	1937	Ettore Castiglioni]	43		Current
Gruppo di Sella, 2ª ed.	1991	Fabio Favaretto e Andrea Zannini	42	1997	Current
Gruppo di Sella, 2ª ed.	1991	Fabio Favaretto e Andrea Zannini	42		Current
Pale di San Martino	1935	Ettore Castiglioni	46		Current
Pale di San Martino Ovest / Dolomiti di Falcade e Primiero, 2ª ed.	2003	Lucio De Franceschi	44		Current
Pale di San Martino Est	2009	Lucio De Franceschi	45		Current
Schiara	1982	Piero Rossi	47		Current
Civetta	2012	Ivo Rabanser	48		Current
Pelmo e Dolomiti di Zoldo	1983	Giovanni Angelini e Pietro Sommavilla	49	1998	Current
Pelmo e Dolomiti di Zoldo	1983	Giovanni Angelini e Pietro Sommavilla	49		Current
Dolomiti Orientali, vol. I – parte I, 4ª ed.	1971	Antonio Berti	50	1973	Current
Dolomiti Orientali, vol. I – parte I, 4ª ed.	1971	Antonio Berti	50	1975	Current
Dolomiti Orientali, vol. I – parte I, 4ª ed.	1971	Antonio Berti	50	1980	Current
Dolomiti Orientali, vol. I – parte I, 4ª ed.	1971	Antonio Berti	50	1999	Current
Dolomiti Orientali, vol. I – parte I, 4ª ed.	1971	Antonio Berti	50		Current
Dolomiti Orientali, vol. I, 3ª ed.	1950	Antonio Berti	50		Outdated
Dolomiti Orientali, vol. I, 3ª ed. con aggiornamenti inseriti nel volume	1956	Antonio Berti	50		Outdated
Dolomiti Orientali, vol. I, aggiornamenti alla 3ª edizione	1956	Antonio Berti	50		Outdated
Dolomiti Orientali, vol. I – parte II, 4ª ed.	1973	Antonio Berti	51		Current
Dolomiti Orientali, vol. I – parte II, 4ª ed.	1973	Antonio Berti	51	1976	Current
Dolomiti Orientali, vol. II, 3ª ed.	1961	Antonio Berti	52		Outdated
Dolomiti Orientali, vol. II, 3ª ed.	1961	Antonio Berti	52		Outdated
Dolomiti Orientali, vol. II, 3ª ed.	1961	Antonio Berti	52	1974	Outdated
Dolomiti Orientali, vol. II, 4ª ed.	1982	Antonio e Camillo Berti	52	2000	Current
Dolomiti Orientali, vol. II, 4ª ed.	1982	Antonio e Camillo Berti	52		Current
Alpi Carniche	1954	Ettore Castiglioni	53		Outdated
Alpi Carniche, vol. I, 2ª ed.	1988	Attilio De Rovere e Mario Di Gallo	53		Current
Alpi Carniche, vol. I, 2ª ed.	1988	Attilio De Rovere e Mario Di Gallo	53	1989	Current
Alpi Carniche, vol. II, 2ª ed.	1995	Attilio De Rovere e Mario Di Gallo	54		Current
Alpi Giulie	1974	Gino Buscaini	55		Current
Alpi Giulie	1974	Gino Buscaini	55	1989	Current
Alpi Giulie Italiane e Slovene	1974	Gino Buscaini	55	2000	Current
Alpi Apuane	1958	Angelo Nerli e Attilio Sabbadini	56		Outdated
Alpi Apuane, 2ª ed.	1979	Euro Montagna, Angelo Nerli ed Attilio Sabbadini	56	1998	Current
Alpi Apuane, 2ª ed.	1979	Euro Montagna, Angelo Nerli ed Attilio Sabbadini	56		Current
Alpi Apuane, 2ª ed.	1979	Euro Montagna, Angelo Nerli ed Attilio Sabbadini	56	1989	Current
Appennino Ligure e Tosco-Emiliano	2003	Marco Salvo e Daniele Canossini	57		Current
Appennino Centrale	1955	Carlo Landi Vittorj	58		Outdated
Appennino Centrale, vol. I, 2ª ed.	1989	Rodolfo Landi Vittorj	58		Current
Gran Sasso d'Italia	1943	Carlo Landi Vittorj e Stanislao Pietrostefani	60		Outdated
Gran Sasso d'Italia, 2ª ed.	1962	Carlo Landi Vittorj e Stanislao Pietrostefani	60		Outdated
Gran Sasso d'Italia, 3ª ed.	1972	Carlo Landi Vittorj e Stanislao Pietrostefani	60		Outdated
Gran Sasso d'Italia, 3ª ed.	1972	Carlo Landi Vittorj e Stanislao Pietrostefani	60	1976	Outdated
Gran Sasso d'Italia, 3ª ed.	1972	Carlo Landi Vittorj e Stanislao Pietrostefani	60	1982	Outdated
Gran Sasso d'Italia, 4ª ed.	1992	Luca Grazzini e Paolo Abbate	60	1995	Current
Gran Sasso d'Italia, 4ª ed.	1992	Luca Grazzini e Paolo Abbate	60		Current
Appennino meridionale. Campania Basilicata Calabria	2010	Luigi Ferranti	61		Current
Sicilia	2001	Giuseppe Maurici e Roby Manfrè Scuderi	62		Current
Sardegna	1997	Maurizio Oviglia	63		Current
Alpi biellesi e valsesiane	2013	Alessandro Castello, Elio Protto e Sandro Zoia	16		Current
