= Club Alpino Italiano =

Italian alpine club

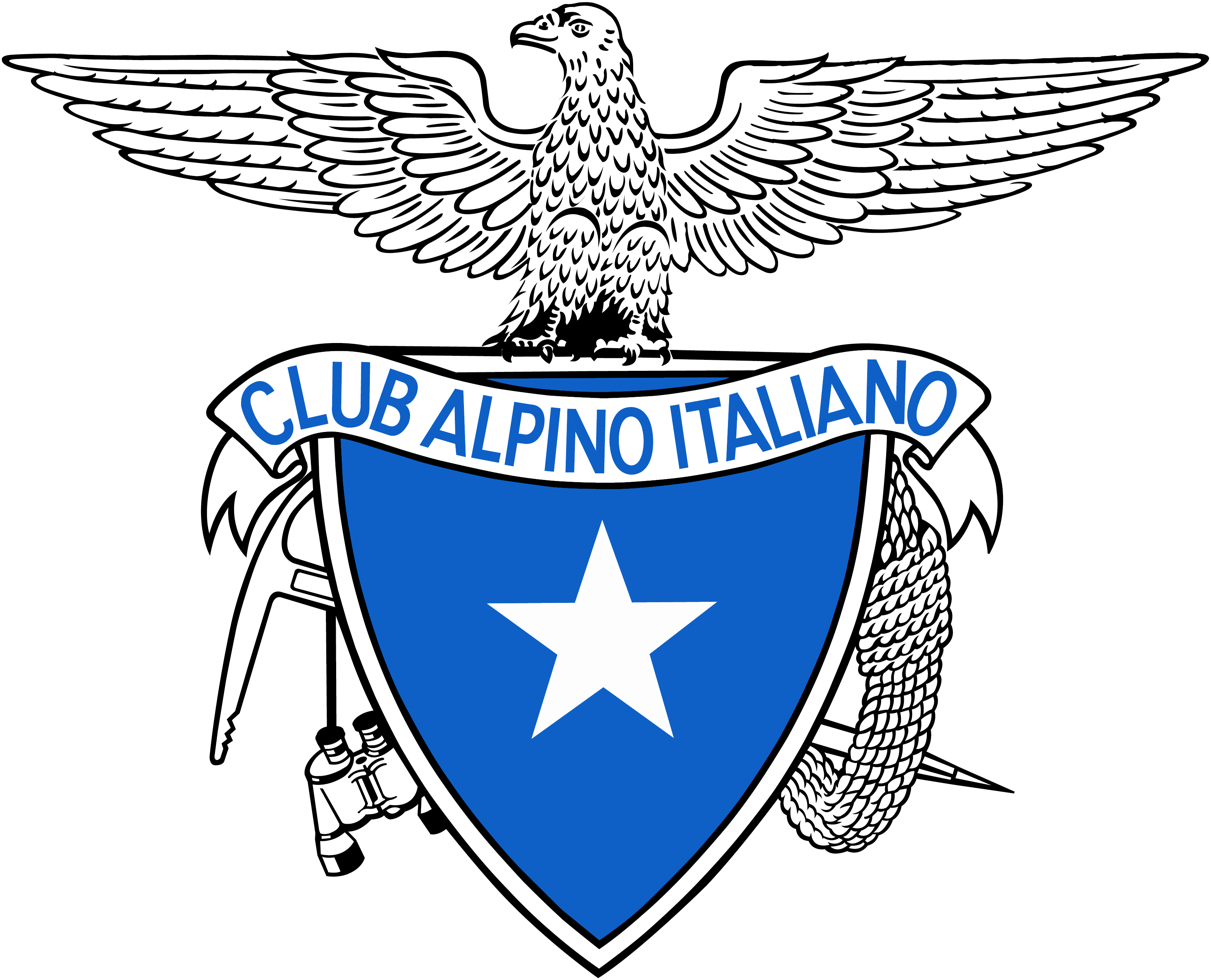
- Sport: mountaineering
- Category: amateur athletic association
- Abbreviation: (CAI)
- Founded: 1863 in Turin
- Regional affiliation: 512 sections
- Headquarters: Milan

Official website
- www.cai.it

The Club Alpino Italiano is the senior Italian alpine club which stages climbing competitions, operates alpine huts, marks and maintains paths, and is active in protecting the Alpine environment.

It was founded in Turin in 1863 by the then finance minister, and mountaineer, Quintino Sella; together with the Swiss Alpine Club, founded in the same year, it is the second-oldest Alpine Club in the world, only preceded by the British Alpine Club. After First World War and the annexation of Trento and Trieste to Italy, it absorbed the "Società degli Alpinisti Tridentini" and the "Società Alpina delle Giulie". As of 2020, it had 306.255 members, 512 sections and 316 sub-sections; the greatest numbers of members came from Lombardy (88,057), Veneto (54,948), and Piedmont (51,396).

Its most famous achievement is the 1954 Italian Karakoram expedition to K2 that made the first successful ascent of K2.

The CAI operates 388 mountain huts, 251 bivouacs and 118 smaller huts and shelters throughout the Italian Alps, for an overall capacity of over 23,500 beds.

== Publishing activity ==
Among many other publications the Club Alpino Italiano, along with Touring Club Italiano, published between 1908 and 2013 the Guida dei Monti d'Italia (in English Guidebook to the Italian mountains), a series of guidebooks covering all the mountain ranges of Italy.

== Influence on Italian Army uniforms ==
Italian military troops adopted a grey-green uniform during World War I. Luigi Brioschi, president of the Milanese section of the C.A.I. (Italian Alpine Club) in 1905 introduced a combat uniform more suitable for a modern war, replacing the showy uniforms of the Royal Sardinian Army. Brioschi demonstrated that the grey uniforms were less visible by opponent snipers, therefore, the project was financed.
