= Colle del Melogno =

Mountain pass in Savona, Italy

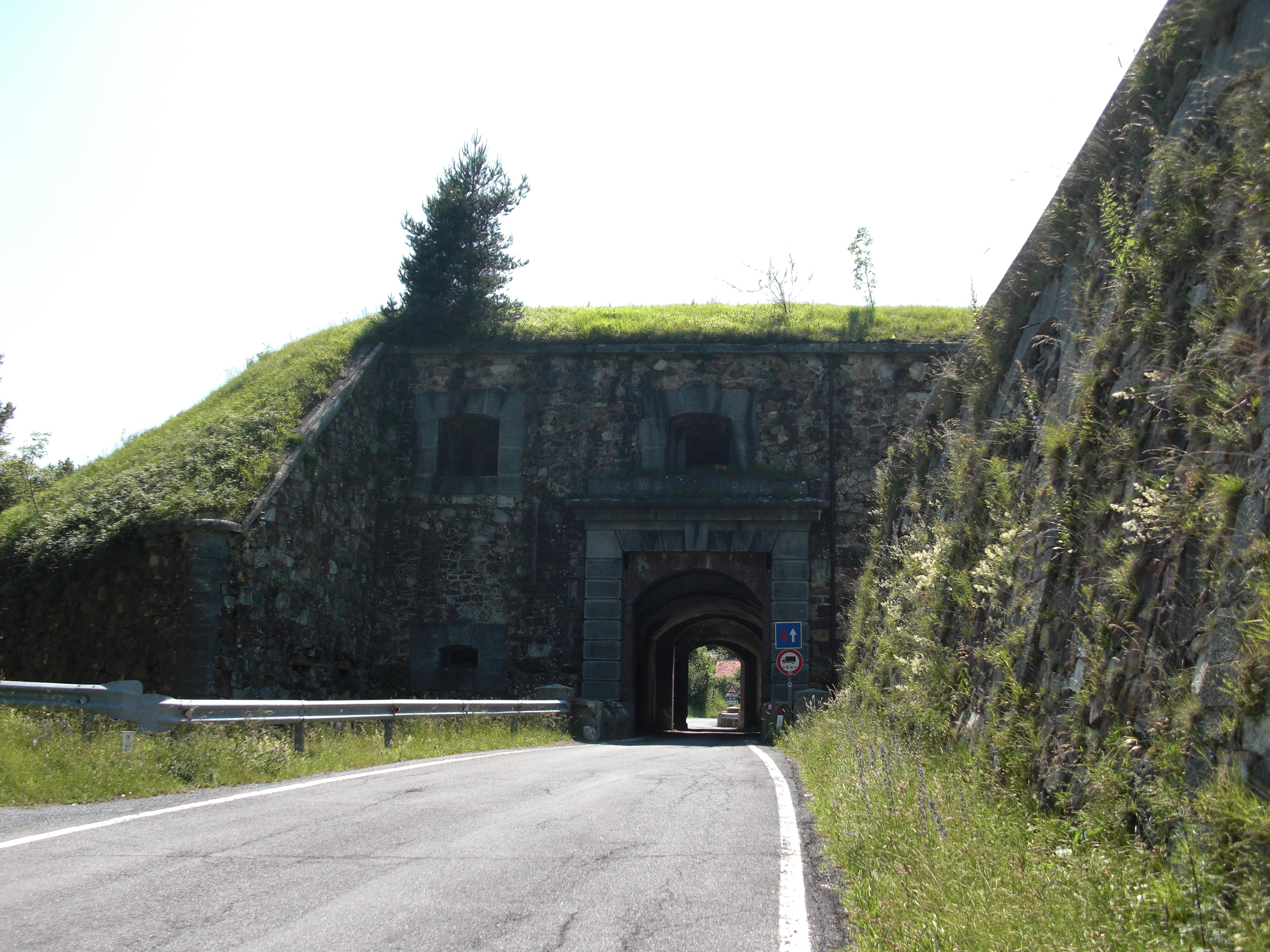

- Location within Alps
- Elevation: 1,028 metres (3,373 ft)
- Traversed by: SP 490

Third Approach
- Location: Liguria, Italy
- Range: Ligurian Alps
- Coordinates: 44°13′49″N 8°11′48″E

Colle del Melogno (1028 m) is a mountain pass in the Province of Savona in Italy. It is located on the main chain of the Alps and connects Ceva and Calizzano with Magliolo and Finale Ligure, on the coast of Ligurian Sea.

As a mountain pass it saw numerous invading armies pass through and different infrastructure and fortifications have been built and expanded over the centuries.

== Hiking ==
The pass is also accessible by off-road mountain paths and is crossed by the Alta Via dei Monti Liguri, a long-distance trail from Ventimiglia (province of Imperia) to Bolano (province of La Spezia).

== History ==
Due to its strategic position, it was of central importance for several armies. It was used already in 203 BC by the Carthaginians, during the retreat following the Second Punic War.

In 1799 was captured by Bertrand Clauzel for the French Army of Italy.

During the Napoleonic period the road was at some point widened.

The current fort cut through by the SP 490 shown in the infobox was built in the 1880s.

== See also ==
- List of highest paved roads in Europe
- List of mountain passes
