= Cima Fontanaccia =

Mountain in the Apennines

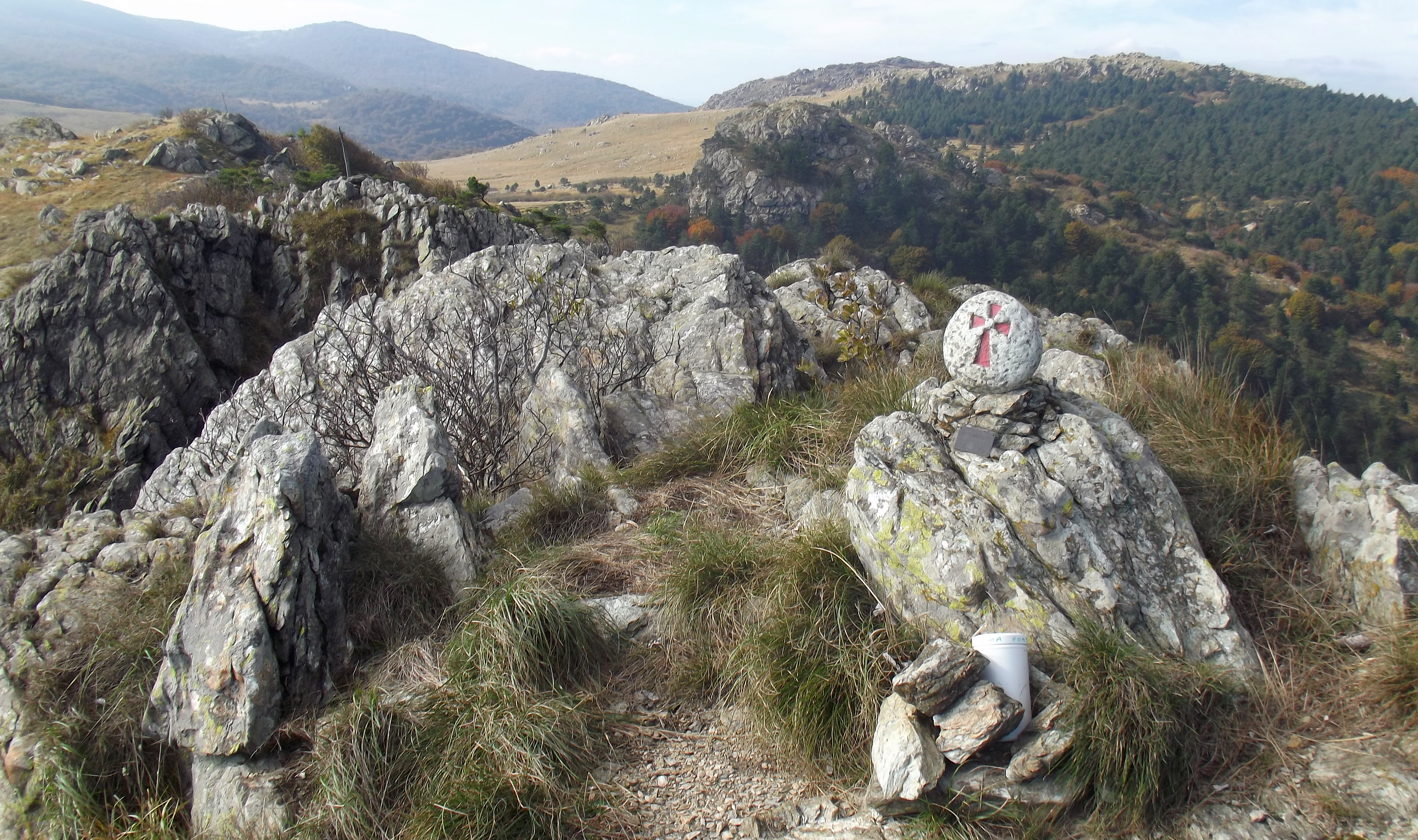
- The summit

Highest point
- Elevation: 1,153 m (3,783 ft).
- Prominence: 65 m (213 ft)
- Coordinates: 44°25′17.73″N 08°36′42.63″E

Naming
- English translation: Bad spring summit
- Language of name: Italian

Geography
- Location within Italy
- Location: Liguria, Italy
- Parent range: Ligurian Apennines

Climbing
- First ascent: ancestral
- Easiest route: South-West ridge

Cima Fontanaccia is a 1153 metres high mountain in the Ligurian Apennines, in Italy.

== Geography ==
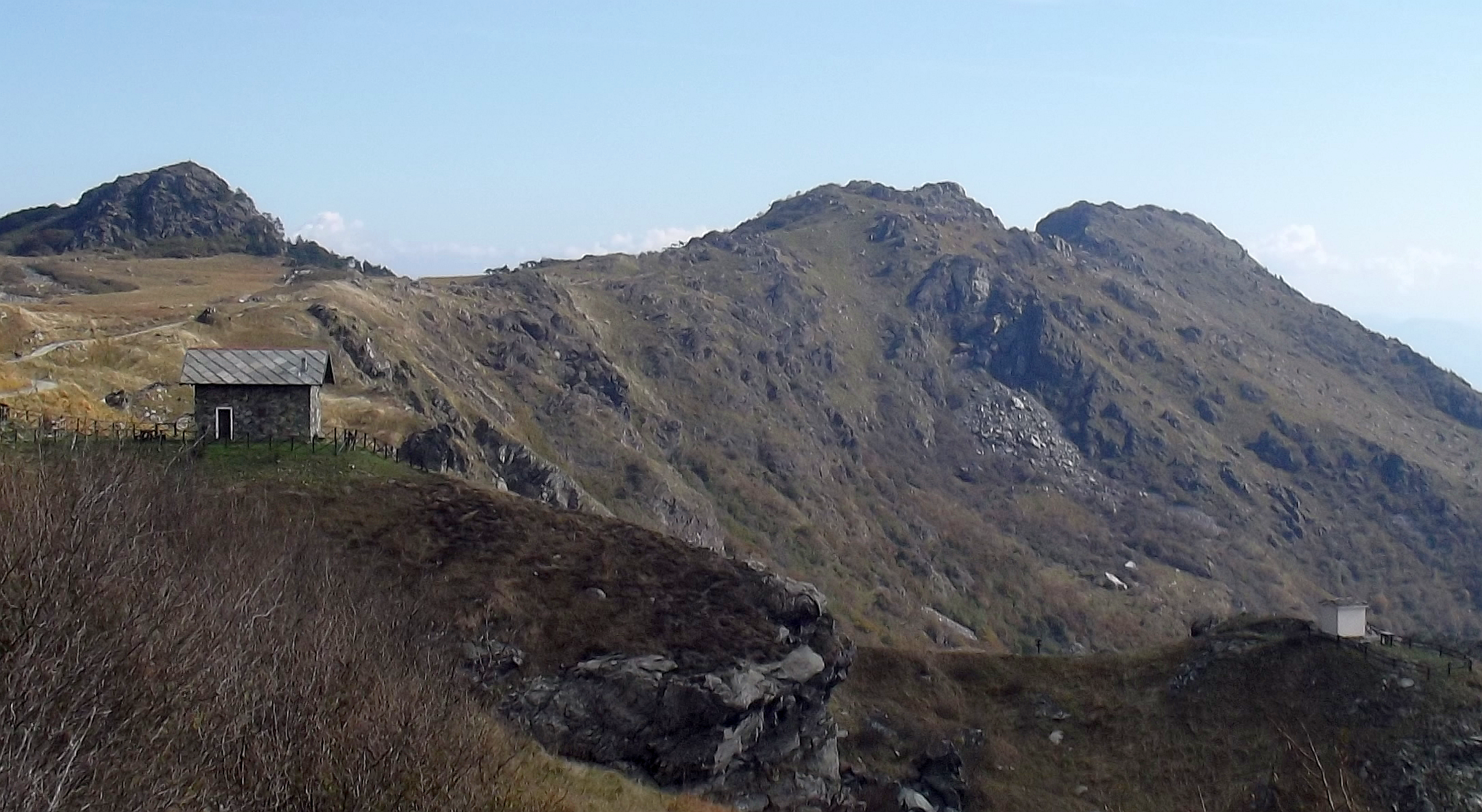
Cima Fontanaccia (centre) between Bric Resunnou (left) and Monte Rama (right).

The mountain is located in the province of Genova, in Liguria, and belongs to the municipality of Cogoleto. It stands on a brief ridge which, starting from the main chain of the Apennines near Rocca del Lago, heads south-east towards the Ligurian Sea and after Cima Fontanaccia continues with Monte Rama and Bric Camulà.

== Access to the summit ==
The summit of Cima Fontanaccia can be accessed following a short unmarked track departing from the footpath connecting Monte Rama and Rifugio Prato Rotondo.

== Nature conservation ==
The mountain is included in the Parco naturale regionale del Beigua.

== Mountain huts ==
- Rifugio Prato Rotondo (1108 m).
- Rifugio Padre Rino (903 m)
