= Monte Rama =

Mountain in Italy

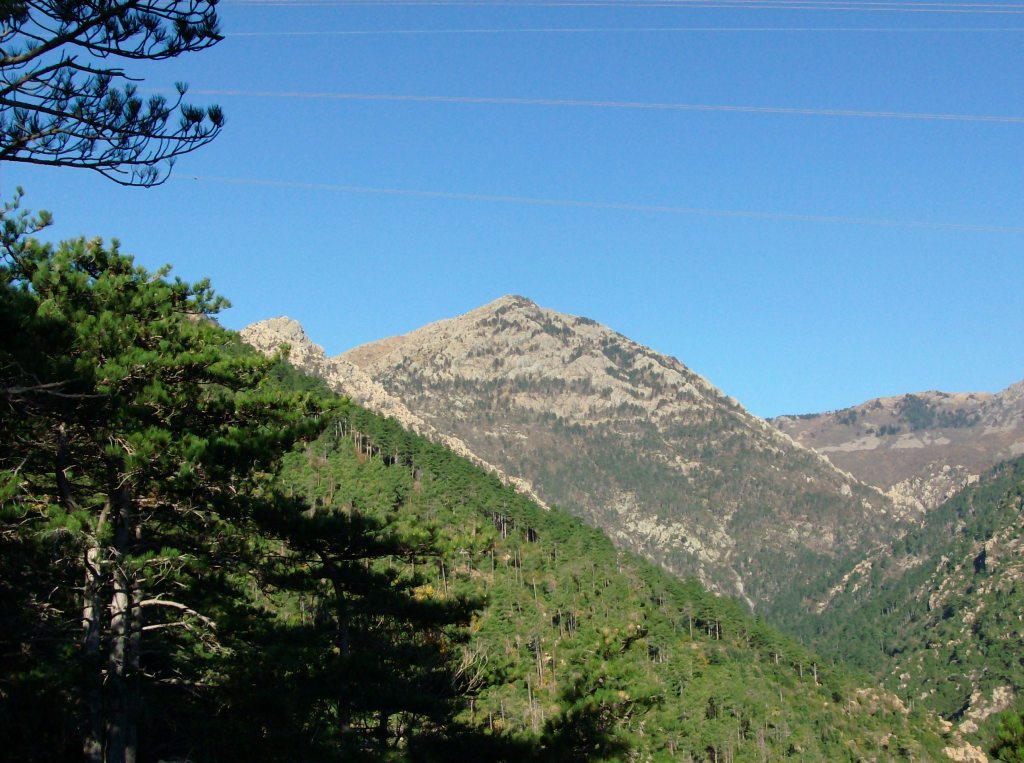

Highest point
- Elevation: 1,150 m (3,770 ft)
- Prominence: 34 m (112 ft)
- Coordinates: 44°25′40″N 8°37′07″E

Geography
- Location within Italy
- Location: Liguria, Italy
- Parent range: Ligurian Apennines

Monte Rama is a mountain in Liguria, northern Italy, part of the Ligurian Apennines.

== Geography ==
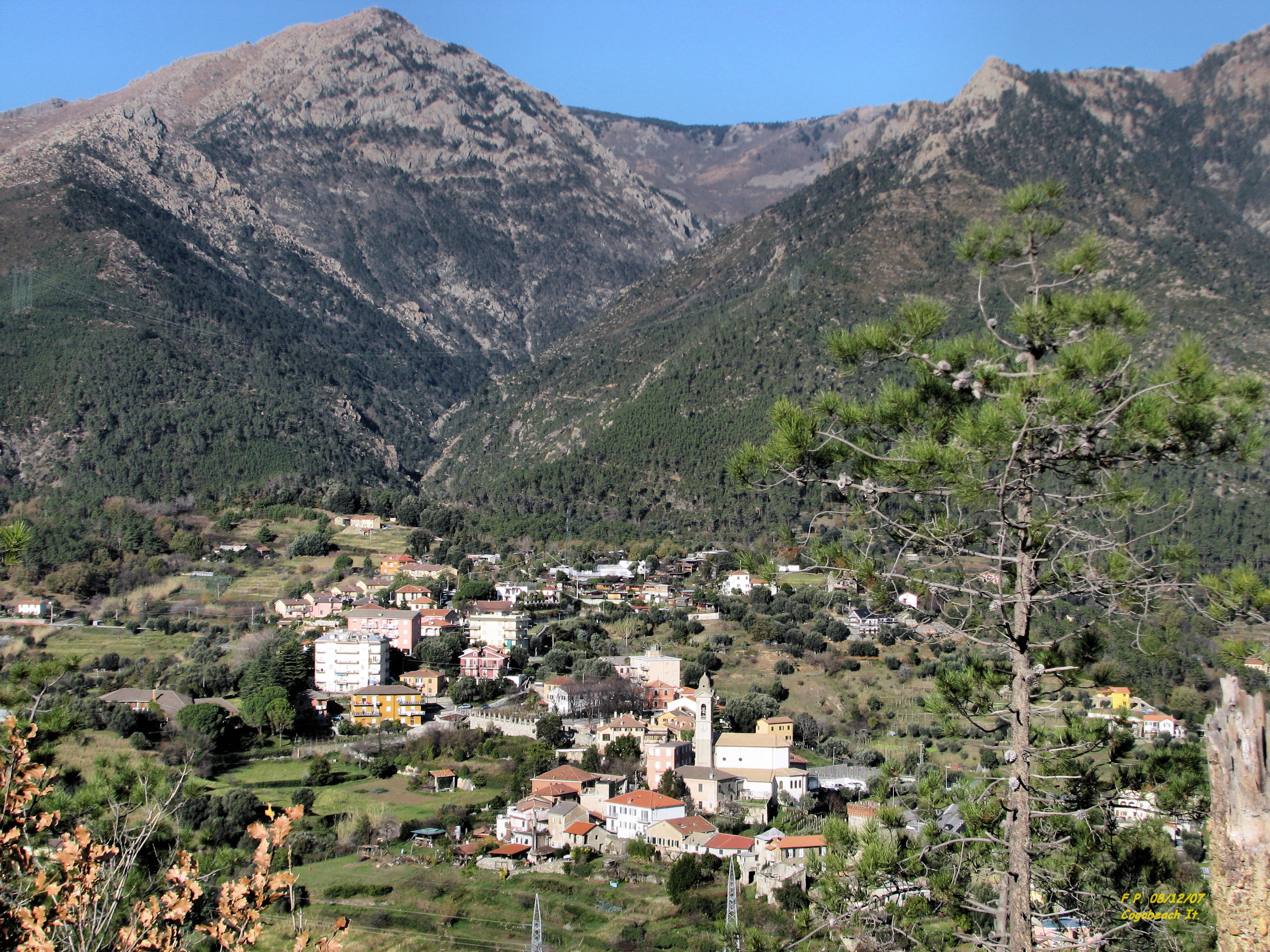
Monte Rama and Lerca village

The mountain is located in the province of Genova, in Liguria, and belongs to the municipality of Cogoleto. It stands on a brief ridge which, starting from the main chain of the Apennines near Rocca del Lago, heads south-east towards the Ligurian Sea and after Cima Fontanaccia reaches the Monte Rama.

== Access to the summit ==
Monte Rama summit can be reached from Sant'Anna Chapel (near Lerca of Cogoleto) following a signposted footpath with a walk of around 2.30 hours.

== Nature conservation ==
The mountain is included in the Parco naturale regionale del Beigua.
