= Albissola Marina =

- Comune
- Comune di Albissola Marina
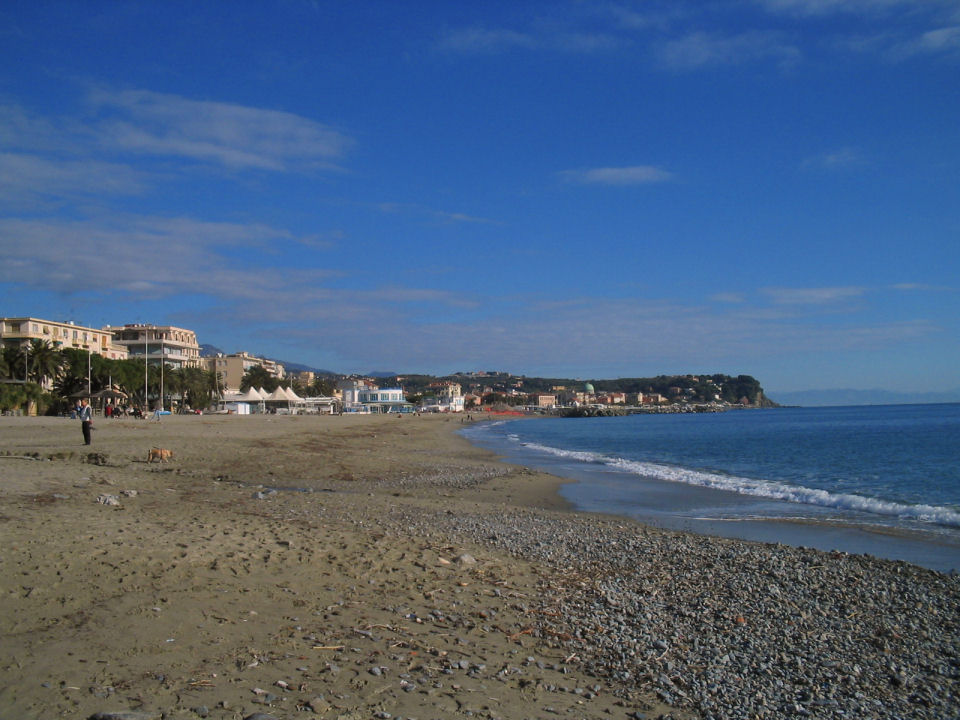

- Flag Coat of arms

- Location of Albissola Marina in Italy Albissola Marina (Liguria)
- Coordinates: 44°20′N 8°30′E
- Country: Italy
- Region: Liguria
- Province: Savona (SV)

Government
  - Mayor: Gianluca Nasuti

Area
  - Total: 3.2 km^{2} (1.2 sq mi)
- Elevation: 3 m (9.8 ft)

Population (30 April 2017)
  - Total: 5,411
  - Density: 1,700/km^{2} (4,400/sq mi)
- Demonym: Albissolesi
- Time zone: UTC+1 (CET)
  - Summer (DST): UTC+2 (CEST)
- Postal code: 17012
- Dialing code: 019
- Website: Official website

Albissola Marina (Ligurian: A Moenn-a d'Arbisseua) is a comune (municipality) in the Province of Savona in the Italian region Liguria, located about 35 kilometres (22 mi) west of Genoa and about 4 kilometres (2.5 mi) northeast of Savona.

The 16th-century Spaniard Gonzalo Argote de Molina identified Albissola Marina as the birthplace of Christopher Columbus, though the details of Columbus' origin remain a matter of dispute.

== History ==
Albissola Marina was a settlement of the Ingauni (a tribe of the Ligures), later conquered by the Romans and called Alba Docilia (now in the communal territory of Albisola Superiore). During the fall of the Western Roman Empire, barbaric invasions led to the division of the town in two different boroughs, one on the seaside and another at the hills' feet.

In the High Middle Ages it was part of the county of Vado, and then of the marquisate of Savona and that of Albisola (1122). In the early 12th century the two Albissolas founded a joined commune whose main activities included trading, agriculture, fishing and ceramics production; after years of struggle, it went under the Genoese control starting from 1251. In 1343 Albisola, together with the communes of Celle Ligure and Varazze, swore allegiance to the Republic of Genoa, to which they remained (with a certain degree of autonomy) until 1797, when the area was conquered by the Napoleonic troops.

After 1815, Albissola followed the history of the Kingdom of Sardinia and, later, the Kingdom of Italy. It became part of the newly formed province of Savona in 1927.

Between the 1950s and 1960s Albissola Marina and the neighbouring Albisola Superiore were a very important centre of artistic culture, thanks to the concentration of painters and sculptors who worked for a long time in the laboratories and furnaces of this geographical area, alongside the local artists. Lucio Fontana, Aligi Sassu, Asger Jorn, Giuseppe Capogrossi were among those who worked here and gave a strong international boost to the local tradition. A fundamental legacy of that flourishing period is the Artists' Walk on the Albissola Marina seafront, which extends for 1 km and was created using the mosaic technique and inaugurated in 1963.

== Main sights ==
- Parish church of Nostra Signora della Concordia (16th century, with an early 20th-century façade). It houses sculptures by Anton Maria Maragliano (17th century)
- Oratory of St. Joseph (17th century)
- Villa Faraggiana, an 18th-century patrician villa built by the Durazzo family.
- Lungomare degli artisti ("Seaside of the Artists"), including about 1 kilometre (0.6 mi) of mosaics executed in 1963 by artists such as Giuseppe Capogrossi, Roberto Crippa, Agenore Fabbri, Lucio Fontana, Wifredo Lam, Aligi Sassu, Eliseo Salino and Asger Jorn.
- Asger Jorn Villa
