= Origin theories of Christopher Columbus =

Family history of Christopher Columbus

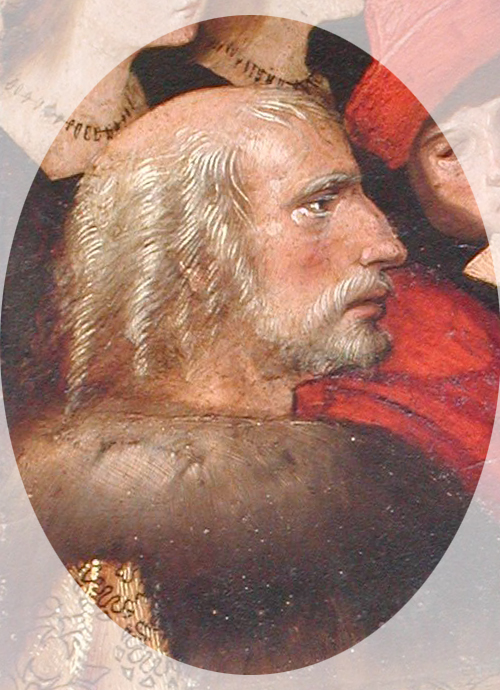
Posthumous representation of Christopher Columbus, as depicted in The Virgin of the Navigators by Alejo Fernández, 1531–36

The consensus among historians is that the Columbus family hailed from the coastal region of Liguria, and that explorer Christopher Columbus himself was born and spent much of his early years in Genoa before moving with his father to Savona at the age of 19. Despite his Genoese origins not having been controversial during his own lifetime or for centuries thereafter, the ethnic or national origin of Columbus has become the subject of much speculation during the 19th and 20th centuries, in what came to be known as the Columbus Question. Many European authors proposed alternative origins for Columbus, motivated largely by a nationalistic desire to claim his heritage for their own countries.

Christopher Columbus seemed to refer to Genoa as his homeland in his own writings, and his Genoese origin can also be inferred from a biography written by his son Ferdinand Columbus. Historians have since catalogued numerous records, documents and literary references associating Columbus with Genoa.

== Evidence for Genoese origin ==
=== Personal writings ===
In a 1498 deed of primogeniture, Columbus writes:

Siendo yo nacido en Genova...de ella salí y en ella naci... (Note: A copy of this document, which dates back to the early seventeenth century and had been officially sent from Crown of Castile to the Republic of Genoa, is conserved in the State Archives of Genoa. The supposed original is in the Archivo General de Indias in Seville.)

— As I was born in Genoa...came from it and was born there...

Many historians affirm the document's authenticity; others believe it apocryphal. (Note: De Lollis observes that "the history of this important document is so clear that there is no doubt about its authenticity." Caddeo considers it authentic. Harrisse considers it a forgery from a later period. The Spanish scholar Angel de Altolaguirre considers it authentic. Madariaga states that the majorat "cannot be considered authentic," but adds, however, that it cannot be a complete invention and must have been edited on the basis of the 1502 testament, which has disappeared without a trace. Ballesteros refutes the theory that it is a forgery; the authenticity of the document is proven by the rediscovery of a certificate, dated 28 September 1501, relative to the royal confirmation of the majorat in the archive of Simancas: "After this discovery the authenticity of the institution of the Columbus majorat has been clearly demonstrated and the historical clauses of the document have increased in value, as have Columbus's declarations regarding his Genoese birthplace." The certificate dated 28 September 1501 is merely a copy of Columbus'1497 royal confirmation of the authorization to institute a majorat and it has none of the text in it that is in the "1598" majorat. Navarrete states that there is no authentic Majorat of 1498, there is only the document presented by Baltazar Colombo which the tribunal rejected.) Some believe that the fact that it was produced in court, during a lawsuit among the heirs of Columbus, in 1578, does not strengthen the case for its authenticity.

A letter from Columbus, dated 2 April 1502, to the Bank of Saint George, the oldest and most reputable of Genoa's financial institutions, begins with the words:

Bien que el coerpo ande aca el coracon esta ali de continuo...

— Though my body is here, my heart is constantly there...

Though some people consider this letter unreliable, the majority of scholars believe it genuine. Examination by graphologists testifies in favour of authenticity. The letter is one of a group of documents entrusted by Columbus to a Genoese friend, after the negative experiences of his third voyage, before setting out on his fourth.

In the spring of 1502, Columbus collected notarized copies of all the writings concerned with his rights to the discovery of new lands. He sent these documents to Nicolò Oderico, ambassador of the Republic of Genoa. To Oderico he also gave "the letter to the Bank of Saint George", in which he announced that he was leaving the bank one-tenth of his income, with a recommendation for his son Diego. Oderico returned to Genoa and delivered the letter to the bank. The bank replied on 8 December 1502, lauding the gesture of their "renowned fellow-citizen" towards his "native land". The reply, unfortunately, never reached its destination; Columbus, back in Castile after his fourth voyage, complained about this in another letter to Ambassador Oderico, dated 27 December 1504, and promptly annulled the bequest.

The first letter was preserved in the archives of the Bank of Saint George until it was taken over by the municipality of Genoa; the other three remained in the Oderico family archives until 1670, when they were donated to the Republic of Genoa. After the fall of the Republic, they passed to the library of one of its last senators, Michele Cambiaso, and were finally acquired by the city of Genoa. There are also public and notarial acts (more than a hundred) — copies of which are conserved in the archives of Genoa and Savona — regarding Columbus's father, Columbus himself, his grandfather, and his relatives. (Note: In May 2006, the Dr. Aldo Agosto, a noted Columbus scholar and state archivist at Genoa, collected one hundred and ten notarial documents, largely unpublished, to be officially presented to the conference of studies in Valladolid. Agosto claims that these documents reconstruct the family tree of Christopher Columbus, going back as far as seven generations.)

=== The life of Admiral Christopher Columbus by his son Ferdinand ===
A biography written by Columbus's son Ferdinand (in Spanish and translated into Italian), The life of the Admiral Christopher Columbus by his son Ferdinand, (Note: Full title: Historie del S. D. Fernando Colombo; nelle quali s'ha particolare, et vera relatione della vita, et de' fatti dell'Ammiraglio D. Christoforo Colombo, suo padre; Et dello scoprimento, ch'egli fece delle Indie Occidentali, dette Nuovo Mondo ("Accounts of His Lordship Ferdinand Columbus; among which there are particulars and a true relation of the life, and of the deeds of the Admiral, Sir Christopher Columbus, his father; and of the discovery, which he made, of the West Indies, called the New World")) exists. (Note: The first nineteen of this book's fifty chapters were published in 1535, the first full version in 1851. This biography of Columbus was translated into Italian by Alfonso de Ulloa and printed for the first time in Venice in 1571. Alfonso de Ulloa was a Spaniard born in Caceres in 1529. His father, Francisco, fought for the emperor Charles V and in 1552 came to Venice as a secretary of the Spanish ambassador Diego Hurtado de Mendoza. Ulloa knew Italian so well that he rendered Spanish and Portuguese works into that language. His most famous translation is the Vita dell'Ammiraglio, 1571, "Ferdinand Columbus's life of his father," a book now of priceless value, because the original does not survive. The American historian Washington Irving described the Vita as "an invaluable document, entitled to great faith, and is the corner-stone of the history of the American continent.") In it, Ferdinand claimed that his father was of Italian aristocracy. He describes Columbus to be a descendant of a Count Columbo of the Castle Cuccaro (Montferrat). Columbo was in turn said to be descended from a legendary Roman General Colonius. It is now widely believed that Christopher Columbus used this persona to ingratiate himself with the aristocracy, an elaborate illusion to mask a humble merchant background. Ferdinand dismissed the fanciful story that the Admiral descended from the Colonus mentioned by Tacitus. However, he refers to "those two illustrious Coloni, his relatives." (Note: In this regard, the eminent Spanish historian Antonio Ballesteros Beretta has written: "One person is responsible for the polemics about the birthplace of Christopher Columbus, and that person is his own son Ferdinand, who, in his biography of his father, displayed ignorance and doubts on a subject which, on the contrary, he should have known well. We must unhesitatingly point out that Don Ferdinand's work is rather tendentious and must be used with great caution. The problem of the Admiral's origin would not exist if Ferdinand had told the truth, which, instead, he deliberately concealed." "His dubious attitude" continues Ballesteros, "about the Discoverer's origins has given rise to an endless series of hypotheses, some of which are farfetched and fantastic. It is true that Ferdinand, in his father's biography, never ventures away from the Italian thesis, but he creates a great confusion. He tries to condition his readers, speaking of a noble family, from which his progenitor was presumably descended. He seeks it in Italy, and his attempts are aimed at creating a kind of nebula in which the splendour of an uncertain birth shines, and at the same time of a definite noble background. What is behind the father's silence and the confusion originated by the son?" Ballesteros has no hesitation in explaining: "We cannot blame Christopher or Ferdinand for having wanted to hide their origins. It was natural and human that Columbus, having reached great heights, at the side of the most powerful sovereigns of the earth, should conceal, with a claim of noble ancestry, his humble origins. Let us try to understand these human weaknesses and let us have compassion on his memory.") According to Note 1, on page 287, these two "were corsairs not related to each other or to Christopher Columbus, one being Guillame de Casenove, nicknamed Colombo, Admiral of France in the reign of Louis XI". At the top of page 4, Ferdinand listed Nervi, Cogoleto, Bogliasco, Savona, Genoa and Piacenza (all inside the former Republic of Genoa) (Note: The city of Piacenza was part of the Duchy of Milan; the Republic of Genoa was the latter's satellite.) as possible places of origin. He also stated:

Colombo ... was really the name of his ancestors. But he changed it in order to make it conform to the language of the country in which he came to reside and raise a new estate ...

In chapter ii, Ferdinand accuses Agostino Giustiniani of telling lies about the discoverer:

Thus this Giustiniani proves himself to be an inaccurate historian and exposes himself as an inconsiderate or prejudiced and malicious compatriot, because in writing about an exceptional person who brought so much honor to the country ...

In chapter v, he writes:

And because it was not far from Lisbon, where he knew there were many Genoese his countrymen, he went away thither as fast as he could ...

Ferdinand also says (chapter XI) that before he was declared admiral, his father used to sign himself "Columbus de Terra rubra," that is to say, Columbus of Terrarossa, a village or hamlet near Genoa. In another passage, Ferdinand says that his father went to Lisbon and taught his brother Bartholomew to construct sea charts, globes and nautical instruments; and sent this brother to England to make proposals to Henry VII of his desired voyage. Finally, Ferdinand says incidentally (chapter LXXII) that Christopher's brother, Bartholomew Columbus named the new settlement Santo Domingo in memory of their father, Domenico.

The publication of The life of the Admiral Christopher Columbus has been used by historians as providing indirect evidence about the Genoese origin of Columbus.

=== The testimony of the ambassadors ===
In April 1501, in the feverish atmosphere of the discovery, Nicolò Oderico, ambassador of the Genoese Republic, after praising the Catholic Sovereigns, went on to say that they "discovered with great expenditure hidden and inaccessible places under the command of Columbus, our fellow-citizen, and having tamed wild barbarians and unknown peoples, they educated them in religion, manners and laws". Furthermore, two diplomats from Venice added the appellation "Genoese" to Columbus's name: the first, Angelo Trevisan, in 1501, (Note: Angelo Trevisan, chancellor and secretary to Domenico Pisano, the Venetian Republic's envoy to Spain, writing to Domenico Malipiero, member of Venice's Council of Predagi, notes that "I have succeeded in becoming a great friend of Columbus," and goes on to say: "Christoforo Colombo, Genoese, a tall, well-built man, ruddy, or great creative talent and with a long face.") the second, Gasparo Contarini, in 1525. (Note: Gasparo Contarini, Venice's ambassador to the courts of Spain and Portugal, reporting to the Senate of the Venetian Republic on 16 November 1525 on the whereabouts of the island of Hispaniola (Haiti), spoke of the Admiral who was living there. The Admiral was Diego, Christopher's eldest son. Ambassador Contarini describes him thus: "This Admiral is son of the Genoese Columbus and has very great powers, granted to his father.") In 1498, Pedro de Ayala, Spanish ambassador to the English court, mentioned John Cabot, "the discoverer, another Genoese, like Columbus".

=== Contemporary European witnesses and writers ===
The historian Bartolomé de las Casas, whose father traveled with Columbus on his second journey and who personally knew Columbus's sons, (Note: Though he never appears to have had much to do with Columbus personally, Las Casas knew his son Diego, who provided some information on the early life of Columbus, and also was well acquainted with his natural son, Ferdinand. Las Casas knew both brothers of Columbus, Diego and Bartholomew, "rather well" and gave a succinct description of Bartholomew's person, temperament, and abilities, which demonstrated that he could both observe and describe with economy and distinction. Pedro de Arana, captain of one of the ships Columbus had on his third voyage and brother of Ferdinand Columbus's mother, was another member of the Columbus family group whom Las Casas knew well. He also "held frequent conversations" with Juan Antonio Colombo, a Genoese relative of Columbus, master of a ship on the third voyage. Thus Las Casas enjoyed such an intimate and, at the same time, so extensive a knowledge of the Columbus family circle and of both printed and manuscript material on the subject, that he was able to write of the Admiral of the Ocean Sea with unequaled familiarity and authority.) writes in chapter 2 of his Historia de las Indias:

This distinguished man was from the Genoese nation, from some place in the province of Genoa; who he was, where he was born or what name he had in that place we do not know in truth, except that before he reached the Nation in which he arrived, he used to call himself Cristóbal Colombo de Terrarubia.

The historian Gonzalo Fernández de Oviedo y Valdés, writes that Domenico Colombo was the Admiral's father; and in chapter 2, book 3 of his Historia general y natural de las Indias:

Christopher Columbus, according to what I have learned from men of his nation, was originally from the province of Liguria, which is in Italy, where the city and the Seignory of Genoa stands: some say that he was from Savona, others that he was from a small place or village called Nervi, which is on the eastern seashore two leagues from the self same city of Genoa; but it is held to be more certain that he may have been originally from Cugurreo (Cogoleto) near the city of Genoa.

Many other contemporary writers agree that the discoverer was Genoese:

- The Portuguese Rui de Pina wrote two works, Chronica d'El Rey, dom Affonso and Chronica d'El Rey, dom João II. It has been ascertained that the manuscripts had been completed before 1504, although they were published in the Eighteenth century. Chapter 66 in the second manuscript, "Descubrimiento das Ilhas de Castella per Collombo," explicitly states, "Christovan Colombo italiano."
- In the 1513 edition of the Map of the New World from Ptolemy, it says: "This land with the adjacent islands was discovered by the Genoese Columbus, sent by the King of Castile."
- The Turkish geographer Piri Ibn Haji Mehmed, known as Piri Reis, in his map of 1513, writes: "These coasts are called the coasts of the Antilles. They were discovered in the year 896 of the Arabic calendar. It is said that a Genoese infidel, Columbus by name, discovered the place." (Note: This map was drawn by Piri Reis, a Turkish cartographer and geographer, known as the nephew of Kemal Reis, in Gelibolu, in the month of muharrem of the year 919 (that is, between the 9th of March and the 7th of April of the year 1513). A large fragment of the map was found in 1929 during work to transform the Topkapı Palace. In 1501 the Turkish seamen engaged in a violent naval battle in the western Mediterranean. They captured a few Spanish cargo ships, in one of which they found various objects and products from America. Piri Reis writes thus in his Bahriye: "On the enemy ships which was captured in the Mediterranean, we found a stone similar to jasper." It was on this occasion that the Turks came into possession of the map that Piri Reis used to trace the coastlines of America. According to the notes made on it, the map was constructed using several other maps as source material. There is no doubt as to its authenticity. In note 5 of the map, here is what Piri Reis tells us, in Ottoman Turkish language: « ... Amma şöyle rivayet ederler kim Cinevizden [from Genoa] bir kâfir [an infidel] adına Qolōnbō [named Columbus] derler imiş, bu yerleri ol bulmuştur ... » The note goes on to tell how Columbus proposed the enterprise "to the great men of Genoa" and how, on being rejected by them, he turned "to the king of Spain." It continues: "The deceased Gazi Kemal had a Spanish slave who told Kemal Reis he had been three times to that Land along with Columbus." The importance of the testimony on this Turkish map from a time close to that of the discovery lies in the source of the news it carries: a Spanish ship captured by the Turks in 1501. The document is wholly unconnected with contemporary Christian culture and completely autonomous from the above-mentioned references.)
- Hernando Alonso de Herrera, in his anti-Aristotelian dissertation, completed in Salamanca in 1516, and published in Latin and Spanish, wrote: "Xristoval Colon ginoves."
- In a Portuguese map of 1520, (Note: Also in K. Kretschmer's Die Entdeckung Amerikas, plate XII.) it is said: "Land of the Antipodes of the King of Castile, discovered by Christopher Columbus Genoese."
- The German Peter von Bennewitz writes, in 1520, in the Typus Orbis Universalis: "In the year 1497 (sic) this land (America) with the adjacent islands was discovered by Columbus, a Genoese by mandate of the King of Castile."
- The German Johannes Schöner states in the Globus of 1520: "This (island) produces gold, mastic, aloes, porcelain, etc. and ginger — Latitude of the island 440 miles — Longitude 880 — discovered by Christopher Columbus Genoese, captain of the King of Castile in the year of Our Lord 1492."
- The Spaniard Francisco López de Gómara writes: "Christopher Columbus was originally from Cogurreo or Nervi, a village of Genoa, a very famous Italian city."
- The Portuguese Garcia de Resende, poet and editor, writes: "Christouao Colombo, italiano."
- The Swiss Heinrich Glarean (Loriti) writes: "To the west there is a land they call America. Two islands, Hispaniola and Isabella: which regions were travelled, along the coast, by the Spaniards, by the Genoese Columbus and by Amerigo Vespuzio."
- The Spaniard Hieronymo Girava, who lived in the first half of the 16th century, writes: "Christoval Colon Genoese, great seaman and mediocre cosmographer."
- The Portuguese João de Barros writes: "As all men declare, Christovão Colom was of Genoese nation, a man expert, eloquent and good Latinist, and very boastful in his affairs"; (Note: Décadas da Ásia, begun in 1539 and first published in 1552.) and: "As in this kingdom came Christopher Columbus Genoese, who had just discovered the western islands that now we call Antilles."
- The German known as Giovanni Boemo Aubano, of the first half of the 16th century, writes: "Christoforo Palombo, Genoese, the year 1492."
- The Flemish Abraham Ortelius, writes: "It seems to surpass the bounds of human wonder that all this hemisphere (that today is called America and, because of its immense extent, the New World) remained unknown to the ancients until the Christian year 1492, in which it was first discovered by Christopher Columbus, Genoese."
- The Portuguese Damião de Góis, writes: "The Genoese Columbus, a man expert in nautical arts"; and, in the index: "Columbi genuen- sis, alias Coloni commendatio." (Note: In 1540, Damião de Góis, writes in his Fides, religio, moresque Aethiopum: "In his life [he refers to D. João II] the Genoese Columbus ... offered him his services.")
- The Spaniard Nicolás Monardes, writes: "In the year 1492 our Spaniards were led by don Christoval Colon, native of Genoa, to discover the West Indies."
- The German Laurentius Surius, writes: "There was at the court of the King of Spain a certain Christopher Columbus whose homeland was Genoa."
- In 1579, for the Cristoph Pantin's edition, the yearbooks of the Genoese Senate were published, in Antwerp, edited by Petro Bizaro: Senatus Populique Genuensis rerum domi forisque gestarum historiae atque annales. Among what is written to celebrate many industrious Genoese men, you can read that: "cum Christophoro Columbo navalis scientiae absolutissima peritia apud omnem venturam posteritatem, juro optima aliqua ex parte conferri vel comparari possit."
- The Portuguese Fernão Vaz Dourado in the Atlante of 1580, notes: "Land of the Antipodes of the King of Castile discovered by Christopher Columbus Genoese."
- The Spaniard Alvaro Gomez, writes: "Thanks to the eager industry of Christopher Columbus Genoese, word was brought to our Sovereigns of an unknown world."
- The Frenchman Gilbert Génebrard, writes: "Ferdinand, at the urging of his wife Isabella, Queen of Castile, Leòn and Aragon, sent Christopher Columbus Genoese to seek new land."
- The Swiss Theodor Zwinger, who died in 1588, was the author of the Theatrum Humanae Vitae, Basle 1604. In the index we read: "Cristoforo Colono, or Colombo Genoese."
- On an unspecified date, certainly prior to 1591, the Turk Basmagi Ibrahim published a book, written by a Turkish author who has remained anonymous, entitled Turich-i-Hind-i garbi iachod hadis-i-nev (History of the West Indies, in other words the New Story). The third chapter of this book dedicated to the discoverer of the "New World or New Land," states: "From the village of Nervi, which is among the Genoese possessions, a man who was born who had the name Christopher and the surname Columbus. Since he had completed journeys by land and by sea [...] he stayed on an island by the name of Madeira [...] under the domain of the wretched (sic) Portugal."
- The Flemish Theodor De Bry, writes: "From everything it can be stated with certainty that it was first discovered by Christopher Columbus Genoese."
- The Portuguese Gaspar Frutuoso, in a sixteenth-century manuscript entitled As Saudades da terra, printed by Alvaro Rodriguez Azevedo in 1873 in Funchal (Madeira), writes in the Anales of Porto Santo: "On this island the great Christovao Colombo, the Genoese, resided for some time."
- The German David Chytraeus writes: "Primum Novum Orbem in occidente, omnibus antea ignotum et inaccessam... pervestigare et aperire... Christophorus Columbus Genesis, admirand ad omnen posteritatem ausu et industria coeperat."
- In the volume published by the City of Genoa the testimony is cited of the historian Andres Bernaldez, who died in 1513. He was the author of a Historia de los Reyes Catolicos don Fernando y dona Isabel. In this work, belatedly published in Seville in 1869, it is written: "In the name of Almighty God, a man of the land of Genoa, a merchant of printed books who was called Christopher Columbus." Actually, in the original text of Bernaldez, it says "land of Milan". However, this is merely lack of precision. In the 15th century, the Republic of Genoa was alternately fully and legally dependent on the Duchy of Milan and the latter's satellite. The editor rightly interpreted the Milanese reference in the sense of Genoese origin.
- A reference, dated 1492, by a court scribe Galindez, referred to Columbus as "Cristóbal Colón, genovés."
- The historian Peter Martyr d'Anghiera was the earliest of Columbus's chroniclers and was in Barcelona when Columbus returned from his first voyage. In his letter of May 14, 1493, addressed to Giovanni Borromeo, he referred to Columbus as Ligurian, Liguria being the Region where Genoa is located.
- Michele da Cuneo from Savona, a friend of Columbus's (possibly from childhood), sailed with Columbus during the second voyage and wrote: "In my opinion, since Genoa was Genoa, there was never born a man so well equipped and expert in the art of navigation as the said lord Admiral."
- Giambattista Strozzi, a Florentine merchant, reported in a letter sent from Cadiz on March 19, 1494: "On the 7th of this month there arrived here in safety twelve caravels which came from the new islands found by Columbus Savonese, Admiral of the Ocean, for the king of Castile, having come in twenty-five days from the said islands of the Antilles."
- Cesáreo Fernández Duro, in his book Colón y la Historia postuma, mentions the chronicler Alonso Estanquez, who has composed a Crónica de los reyes don Fernando y doña Isabel, before 1506, where he writes: "Cristobal Colón, genovés."
- In 1507, Martin Waldseemüller published a world map, Universalis Cosmographia, which was the first to show North and South America as separate from Asia and surrounded by water. Below the island of Hispaniola, near the coast of Paria (Central America) he inserted the words: "Iste insule per Columbum genuensem almirantem ex ma[n]dato regis Castelle invent[a]e sunt" or "these islands have been discovered by the Genoese admiral Columbus by order of the king of Castile."
- Witnesses in the 1511 and 1532 hearings in the Pleitos agreed that Columbus was from the Ligur. Another witness at the same hearing placed it more precisely, testifying, "I heard it said that [he] was from the seigneury of Genoa, from the city of Savona." (Note: Testimony of Rodrigo Barreda: "oyo decir que hera de la senioria de Genova de la cibdad de Saona.")
- Father Antonio de Aspa, a Hieronymite from the convent of Mejorada, between 1512 and 1524, wrote a report on Columbus's first voyage, drawn largely from the Decades of Peter Martyr d'Anghiera, in which he claimed that Columbus was Genoese. (Note: Father Antonio de Aspa mentions that three Genoese merchants helped to finance the venture: Jacopo Di Negro, from Seville, Zapatal, from Jerez, and Luis Doria, from Cadiz. To these names we can add the Genoese merchants Rivarolo, Doria, Castagno and Gaspare Spinola, mentioned by Nuncibay in his Genealogia de la Casa de Portugal, and in Columbus's correspondence with his son Diego. Ballesteros remarks that the only certain thing is that the Italian families of Pinello, Berardi, Centurione, Doria, Spinola, Cattaneo, Di Negro and Rivarolo appear continually in the presence of the great Genoese.)
- The Portuguese Jorge Reinel, in his map of 1519, writes the following words: "Xpoforum cõlombum genuensem."
- The German Simon Grynaeus, writes: "Christophorus natione Italicus, patria Genuensis, gente Columba."
- D. Diego, a grandson of the admiral, was knight of the Order of Santiago, in the genealogy section, of 1535, says: "Paternal Grandparents / Christopher Columbus, a native of Saona near Genoa, / and Filipa Moniz, a native of Libon." In the same year, Pedro de Arana, a cousin of Columbus's Spanish mistress, testified that he knew Columbus was from Genoa. (Note: Pedro was close enough to Columbus to have commanded a vessel on his third voyage across the Atlantic.)
- The Spaniard Alonzo de Santa Cruz, c. 1550, said Columbus was from Nervi.
- The Spaniard Pedro Cieza de León writes that Columbus was originally from Savona.
- In his Commentarius de Ophyra regione apud Divinam Scripturam Commemorata of 1561, the Portuguese geographer Gaspar Barreiros, reported that Columbus was "Ligurian." (Note: "Duce Christophoro Colono Ligure.")
- The Spaniard Jerónimo Zurita y Castro, writes: "Christopher Columbus, man, as he said, whose company had always been for the sea and its predecessors, so that was foreign born and raised in poverty and the banks of Genoa."
- The Portuguese António Galvão, writes: "In the yeere 1492, in the time of Don Ferdinando king of Castile, he being at the siege of Granada, dispatched one Christopher Columbus a Genoway with three ships to goe and discouer Noua Spagna."
- The Spaniard Gonzalo de Illescas, writes: "Christopher Columbus Genoese, was born at Nervi, a village near to Genoa."
- The Spaniard Esteban de Garibay, humanist and historian, writes: "A man of the Italian nation, named Christopher Columbus, native of Cugurco (Cogoleto), or Nervi, village of Genoa."
- The Portuguese João Matalio Metelo Sequano in 1580, writes that Columbus was born in the city of Genoa. (Note: "Christophorus ergo Columbus, prouincia Ligur, vrbe, vt aiunt, genuensis, qui Maderam inhabitabit.")
- The Frenchman Lancelot Voisin de La Popelinière, writes: "La plupart des princes chretiens, le nostre sur tous, l'Anglais, le Portugais, l'Espagnol mémes, n'avaient daigné préster sculement l'ouíe a l'ouverture que l'ltalien leur faisait."
- The Spaniard Julián del Castillo, writes: "Christopher Columbus, an Italian, was originally from Cogurio (Cogoleto) or Nervi, village near to the famous city of Genoa."
- The German Michael Neander, writes: "Christophoro Colombo Genuensi."
- The Spaniard Gonzalo Argote de Molina clearly identified Albissola Marina as Columbus's birthplace.
- Friar Juan de la Victoria, author of the 16th century, wrote a Catálogo de los Reyes godos de España extracted from Fernández Duro in his Colón y La Historia Postuma; says the friar: "In the year 1488, the Italian Christopher Columbus, native of Cugureo (Cogoleto) or Nervi, village of Genoa, sailor."
- The Spaniard Juan de Castellanos, poet and chronicler, writes that Columbus was born in Nervi.
- The Spaniard Juan de Mariana, writes: "Christopher Columbus, Genoese of nation."
- The Portuguese Pedro de Mariz, historian and librarian, says that Columbus was Genoese.

Columbus's Genoese birth is further confirmed by the works of the English Hakluyt (1601), of the Spaniard Antonio de Herrera (1612), the great Spanish dramatist Lope de Vega (1614), a paper manuscript dated 1626, conserved in Madrid's National Library, the works of the German Filioop Cluwer (1677), the German Giovanni Enrico Alsted (1649), the French Dionisio Petau (1724), and the Spaniard Luigi de Marmol (1667). This list represents the early writings of non-Italians. In addition, there were sixty-two Italian testimonies between 1502 and 1600. Of these, fourteen are from Ligurian writers. (Note: The other authors being Lombards, Venetians, Tuscans, Neapolitans, Sicilians and one Maltese.)

=== Legal and notarial documents ===
Conformable to the testament in Seville (3 July 1539) is the evidence of Ferdinand Columbus, who states that his father was conterraneo (of the same country) with Mons. Agostino Giustiniani, who was, beyond all doubt, born at Genoa:

Hijo de don Cristóbal Colón, genovés, primero almirante que descubrió las Indias ...

— Son of Christopher Columbus, Genoese, admiral who first discovered the Indies ...

There is a document dated 22 September 1470 in which the criminal judge convicts Domenico Colombo. The conviction is tied to the debt of Domenico — together with his son Christopher (explicitly stated in the document) — toward a certain Girolamo del Porto. In the will dictated by Admiral Christopher Columbus in Valladolid before he died, the authentic and indisputable document which we have today, the dying navigator remembers this old debt, which had evidently not been paid. There is, in addition, the act drawn in Genoa on 25 August 1479 by a notary, Girolamo Ventimiglia. This act is known as the Assereto document, after the scholar who found it in the State Archives in Genoa in 1904. It involves a lawsuit over a sugar transaction on the Atlantic island Madeira. In it, young Christopher swore that he was a 27-year-old Genoese citizen resident in Portugal and had been hired to represent the Genoese merchants in that transaction. Here was proof that he had relocated to Portugal. It is important to bear in mind that at the time when Assereto traced the document, it would have been impossible to make an acceptable facsimile. Nowadays, with modern chemical processes, a document can be "manufactured", made to look centuries old if need be, with such skill that it may be difficult to prove it is a fake. In 1960, this was still impossible.

In addition to the two documents cited, there are others that confirm the identification of the Genoese Christopher Columbus, son of Domenico, with the admiral of Spain. An act dated 11 October 1496 says:

Giovanni Colombo of Quinto, Matteo Colombo and Amighetto Colombo, brothers of the late Antonio, in full understanding and knowledge that said Giovanni must go to Spain to see M. Christopher Columbus, Admiral of the King of Spain, and that any expenses that said Giovanni must make in order to see said M. Christopher must be paid by all three of the aforementioned brothers, each one to pay a third ... and to this they hereby agree.

In a fourth notarial act, drawn in Savona on 8 April 1500, Sebastiano Cuneo, heir by half to his father Corrado, requested that Christopher and Giacomo (called Diego), the sons and heirs of Domenico Colombo, be summoned to court and sentenced to pay the price for two lands located in Legine. This document confirms Christoforo and Diego's absence from the Republic of Genoa with these exact words: "dicti conventi sunt absentes ultra Pisas et Niciam."

A fifth notarial act, drawn in Savona on 26 January 1501, is more explicit. A group of Genoese citizens, under oath, said and say, together and separately and in every more valid manner and guise, that Christopher, Bartholomew and Giacomo Columbus, sons and heirs of the aforementioned Domenico, their father, have for a long time been absent from the city and the jurisdiction of Savona, as well as Pisa and Nice in Provence, and that they reside in the area of Spain, as was and is well known.

Finally, there is a sixth document from the notary of Bartolomeo Oddino, drawn in Savona on 30 March 1515. With this notarial act, Leon Pancaldo, the well-known Savonese who would become one of the pilots for Magellan's voyage, sends his own father-in-law in his place as procurator for Diego Columbus, son of Admiral Christopher Columbus. The document demonstrates how the ties, in part economic, of the discoverer's family with Savona survived even his death.

=== Language ===
The spoken language of Genoa and the Ligurian coast would primarily have been Ligurian. The Italian language was originally based on the fourteenth century vernacular of Florence in the adjacent region of Tuscany, and would not have been the main spoken language of Genoa in the fifteenth century.

Although Columbus wrote almost exclusively in Spanish, (Note: The oldest fragment of writing certainly attributable to Columbus is a marginal note in one of his books. De Lollis dates it around 1481. It is written in bad Spanish, mixed with Portuguese. All Columbus's letters, even those addressed to Genoese friends and to the Bank of Saint George, are written in Castilian.) there is a small handwritten Genoese gloss in a 1498 Italian (from Venice) edition of Pliny's Natural History that he read after his second voyage to America: this shows Columbus was able to write in Genoese and read Italian. There is also a note in Italian in his own Book of Prophecies exhibiting, according to historian August Kling, "characteristics of northern Italian humanism in its calligraphy, syntax, and spelling". (Note: De Lollis claims that Columbus wrote these notes in Italian because of his deep bitterness, at that time, against the Spanish court. Ballesteros advances a more logical theory, suggesting that this is the psychological reaction of an elderly man, nostalgic for his homeland. Surely Columbus would never have written in Italian if he had not been in such close touch with many compatriots, first in Portugal, then in Spain and finally during his voyages of discovery. It is generally accepted that he was on friendly terms with Genoese, Tuscans, Corsicans, Venetians and Neapolitans, and the point has been especially underlined by historians.) Phillips and Phillips point out that 500 years ago, the Romance languages had not distanced themselves to the degree they have today. Bartolomé de las Casas in his Historia de las Indias claimed that Columbus did not know Spanish well and that he was not born in Castile.

Scholars have dedicated themselves to the subject of Christopher Columbus's language. (Note: Chief among them are Menéndez Pidal, Arce, Caraci, Chiareno, Juan Gil, Milano, Consuelo Varela.) They have conducted in-depth research both on the ship's log and on other writings of his that have come down to the modern day. They have analyzed the words, the terms, and the vocabulary, as well as rather frequent variations often bizarre in style, handwriting, grammar, and syntax. Christopher Columbus's language is Castilian punctuated by noteworthy and frequent Portuguese, Italian, and Genoese influences and elements.

== Modern views ==
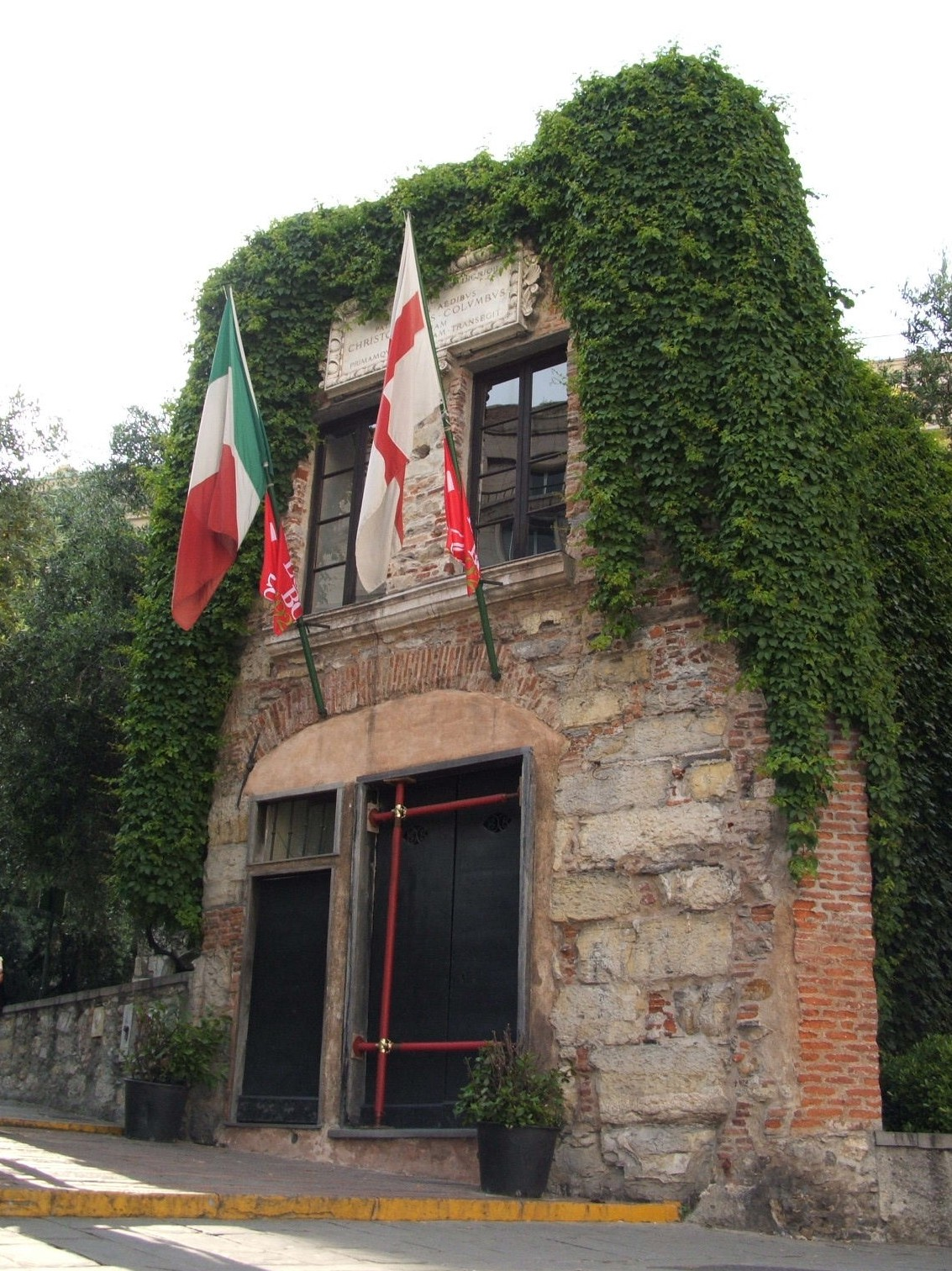
Alleged house of Christopher Columbus in Genoa, Italy.

=== Contemporary historians ===
Most scholars today agree that Columbus was Genoese. (Note: They include the two greatest Columbians in Spain, Antonio Ballesteros Beretta, professor at the University of Madrid, and Juan Manzano Manzano, professor of Seville University; the leading North American authority, Admiral Samuel Eliot Morison; and the Argentinian Diego Luis Molinari, professor at the University of Buenos Aires. Obviously there are many more — admirers and detractors alike — who accept Genoa as his birthplace, including Robertson, Navarrete, Milhou, Irving, Boorstin, Demetrio Ramos, Carpentier, D'Avezac, Manuel Alvar, Nunez Jimenez, Munoz, Peschel, Duro, Mollat, Harrisse, Perez de Tudela, Aynashiya, Morales Padron, Magidovic, Roselly de Lorgues, Asensio, Braudel, Winsor, Fiske, Ciroanescu, Ruge, Markham, Serrano y Sanz, Obregon, Laguarda Trias, Thacher, de Gandia, Emiliano Jos, Aurelio Tio, Goldemberg, Vignaud, Ramirez Corria, Alvarez Pedroso, Marta Sanguinetti, Altolaguirre, Breuer, Leithaus, Alegria, Arciniegas, Davey, Nunn, Johnson, Juan Gil, Sumien, Charcot, Ballesteros Gaibrois, Levillier, Dickey, Parry, Young, Streicher, de La Ronciere, Muro Orejon, Pedroso, Brebner, Houben, Rumeu de Armas, de Madariaga, Stefansson, Martinez Hidalgo, Taylor, Mahn Lot, Consuelo Varela, Verlinden, Bradford, Heers, Davidson, Bergreen, Fernandez-Armesto, McGovern, Kirkpatrick Sale, William and Carla Phillips. Among the leading Italian authorities on Columbus, who also concur, are Spotorno, Sanguineti, Tarducci, Peragallo, Desimoni, De Lollis, Salvagnini, Uzielli, Assereto, Pessagno, Caddeo, Magnaghi, Almagia, Revelli and Bignardelli. Among the famous historians and geographers who have written general works that make reference to Columbus's Genoese birth, we will mention only Humboldt, the great 19th-century German geographer; Burckhardt, author of the prestigious Civilization of the Renaissance in Italy; Fisher, the distinguished English historian; Pirenne, the eminent Belgian historian; Merzbacher, professor of History of Law at the University of Innsbruck; and Konetzke, professor of Iberian and Latin-American History at Cologne University. The eminent Italian historian, Paolo Emilio Taviani, devoted his time to the study of Christopher Columbus, becoming "one of the world's leading authorities on the subject. He retraced the voyages of the Genoese navigator and wrote numerous books about his life and times. Taviani, who was made a life senator in 1991, donated his collection of 2,500 volumes on Columbus to a council-owned library in his native Genoa.")

Samuel Eliot Morison, in his book Christopher Columbus: Admiral of the Ocean Sea, notes that many existing legal documents demonstrate the Genoese origin of Columbus, his father Domenico, and his brothers Bartolomeo and Giacomo (Diego). These documents, written in Latin by notaries, were legally valid in Genoese courts. The documents, uncovered in the 19th century when Italian historians examined the Genoese archives, form part of the Raccolta Colombiana. On page 14, Morison writes:

Besides these documents from which we may glean facts about Christopher's early life, there are others which identify the Discoverer as the son of Domenico the wool weaver, beyond the possibility of doubt. For instance, Domenico had a brother Antonio, like him a respectable member of the lower middle class in Genoa. Antonio had three sons: Matteo, Amigeto and Giovanni, who was generally known as Giannetto (the Genoese equivalent of "Johnny"). Giannetto, like Christopher, gave up a humdrum occupation to follow the sea. In 1496 the three brothers met in a notary's office at Genoa and agreed that Johnny should go to Spain and seek out his first cousin "Don Cristoforo de Colombo, Admiral of the King of Spain," each contributing one third of the traveling expenses. This quest for a job was highly successful. The Admiral gave Johnny command of a caravel on the Third Voyage to America, and entrusted him with confidential matters as well.

On the topic of Columbus's being born somewhere besides Genoa, Morison points out:

Every contemporary Spaniard or Portuguese who wrote about Columbus and his discoveries calls him Genoese. Four contemporary Genoese chroniclers claim him as a compatriot. Every early map on which his nationality is recorded describes him as Genoese or Ligur, a citizen of the Ligurian Republic. Nobody in the Admiral's lifetime, or for three centuries after, had any doubt about his birthplace.

Paolo Emilio Taviani, in his book Cristoforo Colombo: Genius of the Sea discusses "the public and notarial acts – original copies of which are conserved in the archives of Genoa and Savona – regarding Columbus's father, Columbus himself, his grandfather, and his relatives." In Columbus the Great Adventure he further claims that Columbus named the small island of Saona "to honor Michele da Cuneo, his friend from Savona."

This is fully accepted by Consuelo Varela Bueno, "Spain's leading authority on the texts, documents, and handwriting of Columbus." She devotes several pages to the question of Columbus native land, and concludes that "all chroniclers of that period wrote that he was from Liguria in northern Italy." The evidence supporting the Genoese origin of Columbus is also discussed by Miles H. Davidson. In his book Columbus Then and Now: A Life Reexamined, he writes:

Diego Méndez, one of his captains, in testimony given in the ''Pleitos'', he said that Columbus was "Genoese, a native of Savona which is a town near Genoa." Those who reject this and the more than ample other contemporary evidence, given by both Italian and Spanish sources as well as by witnesses at these court hearings, are simply flying in the face of overwhelming evidence. [...] What is the reason behind so much futile speculation? It can be mostly attributed to parochialism. Each of the nations and cities mentioned wants to claim him for its own. Since no effort was made to locate the supporting data until the early nineteenth century, and since at that time not all of the archives had been adequately researched, there was, initially, justification for those early efforts to establish who he was and where he came from. To do so today is to fulfill Montaigne's maxim, "No one is exempt from talking non-sense; the misfortune is to do it solemnly."

=== Crypto-Judaism hypothesis ===
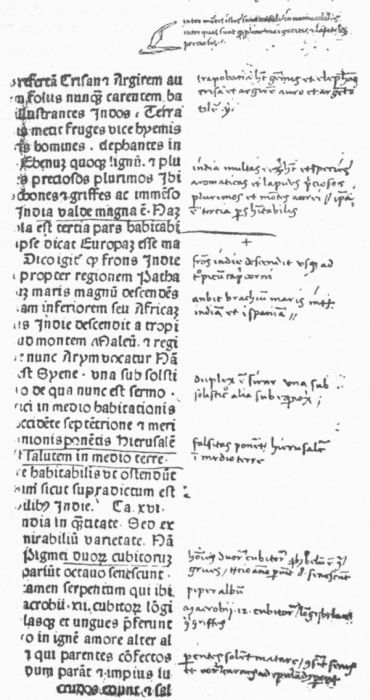
Annotations by Columbus

The history of claims to Columbus being of Jewish origins, and the expedition having close ties with prominent Jews, and connection to the Jewish calendar and the date set for the final Expulsion of Jews from Spain, has been mainly through centennial and jubilee events commemorating him, beginning with 400 years to the journey. In the two and a half centuries that passed since, this theory has been revoked or redeemed according to political perceptions, at times with Jewish scholars distancing themselves from him, and at others trying to connect.

The first was Rabbi Mayer (Moritz) Keyzerling's 1894 book Christopher Columbus and the Participation of the Jews in the Spanish and Portuguese Discoveries. The articles were commissioned by Lazar Strauss for the 1892 celebrations, and published as a book two years later. Mentioned were Luis de Santangel, Columbus's supporter, and Joseph Vizinha, translator of Abraham Zakkuto's Almanach. Keyzerling never claimed that Columbus himself was of Jewish descent.

Four years later, in 1898, Garcia de la Riega's published an assertion that Columbus was of Spanish origin and a hidden Jew. This was based on original research he had done on the Colon family name in Genoa, Spain. In 1913 all these claims were bluntly refuted by American historian Henry Vignaud, based on facts where he clearly stated his Genoese origins, and where a vast amount of documents showed that La Riega's claims were false., and several documents which are now believed to be a forgery.

In 1932, Dr. Cecil Roth wrote his book "A History of the Marranos", in which he promoted the idea that Columbus was a marrano, - a forcefully converted Jew of Spain. Among his proofs where the claims that Columbus referred to the Spanish expulsion in his first accounts, and used the Hebraic term "Second House" for the destruction of the 2nd temple of Jerusalem, a term not used by Christians. Roth also claimed that the insignia at the head of all but one letter to his son, was actually the Hebrew letters Bet-Hei, usually used by religious Jews to mean Be'ezrat Hashem (with God's help), and that the abbreviations under his signature were referring to the Kaddish prayer.

In 1933, Maurice David, an American Antiquitist wrote a book (with the word sensation in its long title) that included images of the documents used by Roth to prove his claims, along with their translation and an explanation of their significance.

In 1940 Salvador de Madariaga published his book "Christopher Columbus", in which he repeated Roth's claims and proofs, weighing them against opposing views and siding with Roth, claiming that Columbus was a marrano forced to leave Spain for Genoa. Some of his proofs were based on the racial traits that he perceived are Jewish, and which he declared Columbus to share. For example, it was known that he was born in Genoa, Italy, but attacked a Genoese fleet. That, explained de Madriaga, was because "he was an unassimilated Genoese, not a genuine Genoese citizen rooted in the soil, but a bird of passage, ready to make his nest anywhere." Similar themes are taken with Columbus' sexual activity, having an illegitimate child with Beatrice Enriquez who according to him was Jewish too.

In his 1942 book Admiral of the Ocean Sea, Samuel Eliot Morison refuted each argument, starting with the simple refute that there is abundant evidence to the contrary. That he was a devout Christian, from Genoa.

In his last interview 1970 even Roth conceded that it was impossible to determine if Columbus had a Jewish heritage.

In a 1973 book, Simon Wiesenthal repeated Roth's claims that Columbus was a Sephardi, careful to conceal his Judaism yet also eager to locate a place of refuge for his persecuted countrymen. Wiesenthal argued that Columbus's concept of sailing west to reach the Indies was less the result of geographical theories than of his faith in certain Biblical texts—specifically the Book of Isaiah. He repeatedly cited two verses from that book: "Surely the isles shall wait for me, and the ships of Tarshish first, to bring thy sons from far, their silver and their gold with them," (60:9); and "For behold, I create new heavens and a new earth" (65:17). Wiesenthal claimed that Columbus felt that his voyages had confirmed these prophecies. Jane Francis Amler shared those views in 1977.

Sepharadic Jews in America continued to promote Madariaga's arguments.

In 1992, 500 years after the expedition, the Sepharadic Jewish Organization set up a traveling exhibition about Colon and his Jewish ties, first shown at the Maritime museum in Haifa, Israel, and then traveled to several countries including Spain and the US.

In 2009, Estelle Irizarry a professor of Hispanic literature from Georgetown University, concluded from Columbus' writings that he spoke Catalan, with some hints to Ladino (Jewish Spanish language), and that hiding his identity could explain several linguistic properties of his. The inscriptions and annotations surrounding the text in books from his library are reminiscent to the Jewish books of the time. Irizarry was referring to the Talmud and Humash editions with a typical gloss (annotation) layout, but these were not special to Jewish texts of the time, and annotations surrounding main text were common for many years. She claimed (with no evidence) that Columbus referred to the Jewish High Holidays in his journal during the first voyage.

The support by the American Sephardi Federation continues even in recent times.

A 2024 documentary produced by Spanish public broadcaster RTVE argues that DNA evidence conclusively proves Columbus's Sephardic Jewish origin. The documentary focuses on the work of José Antonio Lorente, a professor at the University of Granada, who performed DNA analyses on samples of bone fragments collected from the tombs of Columbus, his son Ferdinand Columbus and his brother Diego, in the Seville Cathedral in 2003. In the documentary, Lorente states that Ferdinand's Y chromosome and his mitochondrial DNA "show traits consistent with a Jewish ancestry." Lorente also states that the DNA evidence shows Columbus had origins in the western Mediterranean, likely in Mediterranean Spain or the Balearic Islands. Lorente's research, however, has not been published in any peer-reviewed scientific journal, and Lorente has not made the data available for review by other scientists. In response, forensic geneticists and historians dismissed the claim, making reference to the abundance of available sources showing Columbus was from Genoa, Italy.

=== Catalan hypothesis ===
Since the early 20th century, researchers have attempted to connect Columbus to the Catalan-speaking areas of Spain, usually based on linguistic evidence. The first to propose a birthplace under the Crown of Aragon was Peruvian historian Luis Ulloa in a book originally published in 1927 in French. Antonio Ballesteros Beretta, University of Madrid historian of America, said that Ulloa's "fiery imagination" had placed abstruse interpretations on court documents to support his thesis, had found no positive proof, and had dismissed as false any evidence supporting a Genoese origin.

Throughout Columbus's life, he referred to himself as Christobal Colom; his contemporaries and family also referred to him as such. This is opposed to the Genoese translation "Cristoffa Corombo", or even the Italian "Cristoforo Colombo". It is possible that Colom is the shortened form of the Italian surname Colombo (which means "dove"), although his surname in Genoese would have been Corombo. Colom can also be a Portuguese, French, or Catalan name, and in the latter means "dove".

Some more recent studies also state Columbus had Catalan origins, based on his handwriting, though these have been disputed. Charles J. Merrill, a specialist in medieval Catalan literature at Mount St. Mary's University, claims Columbus's handwriting is typical of a native Catalan, and his mistakes in Castilian are "most likely" transfer errors from Catalan, with examples such as "a todo arreo" (a tot arreu), "todo de un golpe" (tot d'un cop), "setcentas" (set-centes), "nombre" (instead of número), "al sol puesto" (el sol post). Merrill states that the Genoese Cristoforo Colombo was a modest wool carder and cheese merchant with no maritime training and whose age does not match the one of Columbus. Merrill's book Colom of Catalonia was published in 2008.

=== Portuguese hypothesis ===
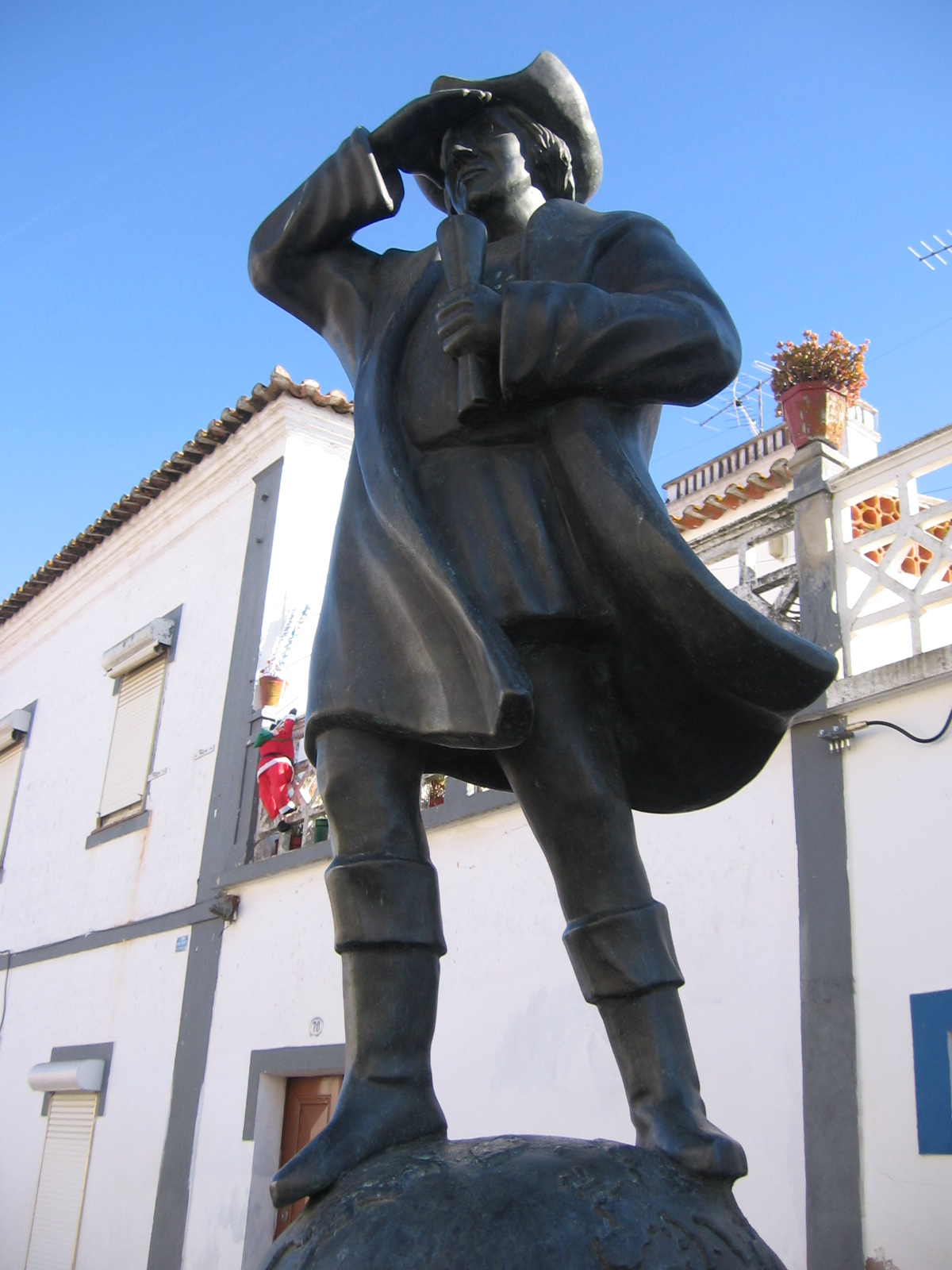
A statue of Columbus in Cuba, a town in Southern Portugal

Patrocínio Ribeiro claimed that Columbus was Portuguese in 1916, and Moisés Bensabat Amzalak hypothesized on Columbus's signature with the Kabbalah. Based on those theories, José Mascarenhas Barreto argued in 1988, that Columbus was a Portuguese agent who hatched up an elaborate diversion to keep the Spanish from the lucrative trade routes, and suggested he was born in Cuba, Portugal, while his real name was supposedly Salvador Fernandes Zarco. The Portuguese hypothesis of Zarco from Cuba was further expanded upon in 2008 by Manuel Luciano daSilva and Sylvia Jorge daSilva who included an analysis of Columbus's signature on documents in the Vatican archives. However, the Zarco genealogy as presented by these authors has been disputed. (Note: In this regard, the American historian Samuel Eliot Morison writes: "If, however, you suppose that these facts would settle the matter, you fortunately know little of the so-called "literature" on the "Columbus Question." By presenting farfetched hypotheses and sly innuendos as facts, by attacking documents of proven authenticity as false, by fabricating others (such as the famous Pontevedra documents), and drawing unwarranted deductions from things that Columbus said or did, he has been presented as Castilian, Catalan, Corsican, Majorcan, Portuguese, French, German, English, Greek, and Armenian.")

In recent years, the Portuguese hypothesis has persisted beyond the controversial Zarco link. Professor João Paulo Oliveira e Costa, the Chair of the Department of History at NOVA University Lisbon, wrote in a 2023 book that it is now "clear the impossibility of Colón having been born into a family of Genoese weavers." Manuel da Silva Rosa, a student of Oliveira e Costa, similarly posited that the Columbus brothers intentionally obfuscated their origins and birth identities for political reasons. An online video of João Paulo Oliveira e Costa's 2024 conference in Lisbon referred to the new research as a "a milestone in Portuguese historiography", arguing that Columbus was a Portuguese nobleman. Columbus research and Proponents of the Portuguese hypothesis also point to a court document which stated that Columbus's nationality was "Portuguese" (Note: The document describes the person as Portuguese but his name is empty. However, Antonio Rumeo De Armas in his book identifies the person, whose name is omitted, as Christopher Columbus by matching it with the payment receipt in Alonso de Quintanilla's ledgers. Rumeu de Armas thinks Columbus was Genoese but so influenced by his years in Portugal that he could have been mistaken for a Portuguese by Spaniards.) and in another, Columbus uses the words "my homeland" in relation to Portugal.

=== Other theories ===
Other hypotheses exist, none of which are broadly accepted. Reviewing them, British historian Felipe Fernández-Armesto writes:

The Catalan, French, Galician, Greek, Ibizan, Jewish, Majorcan, Scottish, and other Columbuses concocted by historical fantasists are agenda-driven creations, usually inspired by a desire to arrogate a supposed or confected hero to the cause of a particular nation or historic community – or, more often than not, to some immigrant group striving to establish a special place of esteem in the United States. The evidence of Columbus's origins in Genoa is overwhelming: almost no other figure of his class or designation has left so clear a paper trail in the archives.

Other theories claim that Columbus was a Byzantine Greek nobleman and the nephew of George Paléologos de Bissipat, a Sardinian nobleman, a Norwegian of Swedish descent, a Scot, or that he was the son of King Władysław III of Varna. Many cities have been hypothesized as the birthplace of Columbus, notably Calvi in Corsica, which in Columbus's times was under Genoese rule.

When Spain's Televisión Española and Italy's RAI co-produced a biography of Columbus, they avoided the issue by having him appear at the Spanish court without explanation.
