= George Paléologos de Bissipat =

George Paléologos de Bissipat, or Georges de Bissipat, sometimes Georges de Dissipat, and also called George the Greek (died in 1496), was vice-admiral of France, who entered the service of Charles VII, Louis XI and Charles VIII some time after the capture of Constantinople by the Turks in 1453.

== Biography ==
His last name, Bissipat, comes from the word "Dishypatos", which literally means "twice consul", being a title of Byzantine dignitaries that was used between the 8th and 11th centuries. He styled himself as Georges Paleologo de Bissipat dit le Grec in French. Bissipat was from Koroni and his real name was Gjergj Bua Shpata. He may have used his second surname, Palaeologos, as a means to strengthen his noble status.

Bissipat was first mentioned in a 1456 French record as "Georgius Paleologus". Before entering French service in 1472, his activities are unknown. It has been suggested that he spent up to a decade in English service as a mariner or corsair. In 1471, he is described as a knight and soldier of Calais.

He was once settled in Bordeaux. To reward him "for the services rendered in the wars", King Louis XI granted him, by letters patent of July 26, 1473, "a seigneurial hotel, located in the city of Bordeaux, near the castle of Lombrières", which was then the seat of the Parliament of Guyenne, founded in 1462. But his land functions were concentrated mainly in Normandy: he was reported as captain of Touques in 1470, 1477 and 1490; on November 1474, he was appointed by the king captain of Lisieux and Orbec, authorized by royal letters of the following November to take his pledges on the income of the viscounty of Auge. In 1475, he was "captain of the king's navy". In 1477, he received letters of naturalization.

On April 9, 1478, as he was no longer captain of Lisieux and no longer enjoyed the income of the viscounty of Auge, the king granted him compensation: "the sum of eight hundred pounds tournaments, to icelle have and take dornavant each year, as long as we like, of the money of the income, prouffit and emolument of our forest of Brotonne, in the viscounty of Pont-Audemer". These letters specify the service that Bissipat rendered to the king at sea: "with regard to the great costs and expenses that he has agreed to him and agrees to do every day for our service, even to the maintenance of a large ship called the Norman, otherwise dictates the Sign, which of our will and command he bought to serve us at sea, where he made war, in what he has spawned and spent great sums of money".

Bissipat was actually engaged in a privateer activity in the service of the King of France with a Gascon sailor, Guillaume de Casenove. The most resounding action of the latter was the attack, on August 13, 1476, of four Genoese galeas and a Flemish bourque off Cabo de San Vicente, and Bissipat was perhaps part of the game. From 1478 to 1480, the county of Flanders having passed under the government of Maximilian I (by his marriage to Mary of Burgundy), Coullon and Bissipat conducted naval operations against the Flemings, blocking them in particular the Calais pass, the French corsairs would have seized eighty Flemish ships.

Shortly before the death of Louis XI (who intervened on August 30, 1483), he was charged with a strange mission: the king had heard that we found on an island of the Ocean located near the African coast and called Cape Verde enough to cure certain diseases, so much so that a man from Honfleur had procured remedies to cure his leprosy; however the sovereign, suffering in his old age from some dermatosis, thought he was suffering from leprose. Bissipat therefore left Honfleur in the first months of 1483, with two boats and a boat together measuring 700 to 800 tons, and three hundred soldiers, bound for the Cape Verde archipelago, and more precisely the island of Maio, where, according to the stories of time travelers, lepers were healed by dipping them in the blood of giant turtles, then by making them eat their flesh. The king died anyway before the return of the expedition.

On August 1, 1485, Bissipat commanded the French flotilla of seven ships that landed the English pretender Henry Tudor (supported by Regent Anne de Beaujeu) on the coast of Pembrokeshire. Three weeks later, on August 21, he carried out with this same squadron a brilliant action off the coast of Cape of Saint-Vincent]m: he seized four Venetian galleys. Contemporary Venetian sources, which describe him as "archipirate".

Georges de Bissipat had a first unknown marriage from which he had at least two sons, Jean and Charles. In 1478, he remarried Marguerite de Poix, daughter of Jean de Poix and sister of Rogues de Poix, who was then Viscount of Pont-Authou and Pont-Audemer (of the old family of Picard origin Tyrel de Poix), advisor and maître d'hôtel of the king. By this second marriage, he obtained the lordship of Troissereux, in Beauvaisis (which Marguerite de Poix had inherited from her mother Jeanne de Guehengnies). On the other hand, the couple acquired in 1480 the fief (viscounty) of Hannaches, in the same region (which also belonged to the family of Guehengnies, but it was necessary to buy back the shares of Jacqueline and Marguerite, sisters of Jeanne), and had the current castle of Hannaches built. Georges de Bissipat also became lord of Blicourt and Mazis (a fief in the parish of Saint-Omer-en-Chaussée), thus integrating the nobility of Beauvaisis. His main residence was the Château d'Hannaches, and it was in the church of this parish that the family burial was installed. He had two sons from his second marriage, George II and William, and a daughter, Antoinette. Georges de Bissipat personally knew Christopher Colombus and his brother. According to some scholars, Bissipat was Christopher Colombus' uncle, based on a letter sent to Rome on March 31, 1493.

== Bibliography ==
- Pierre-César Renet, "The Bissipat du Beauvaisis, Greek princes exiled in France", Memoirs of the Academic Society of Oise, t. XIV, 1889p. 31–98.
- Henry Vignaud, Critical studies on the life of Columbus before his discoveries, Paris, Welter, 1905 (on Georges de Bissipat:p. 165-185).
- J. Mathorez, "The elements of the eastern population in France. The Greeks in France from the 15th to the 19th century", Revue des études grecques, Vol. 29, No. 131, January–March 1916, p. 46-68
- Thomas Basin, Historia, ed. J. Quicherat, t. IIIp. 166;Robert Gaguin, Compendium, fol. 279.
- Philippe de Commynes, Memoirs, I, 5.
