= Orto Botanico di Villa Beuca =

Botanical garden in Italy

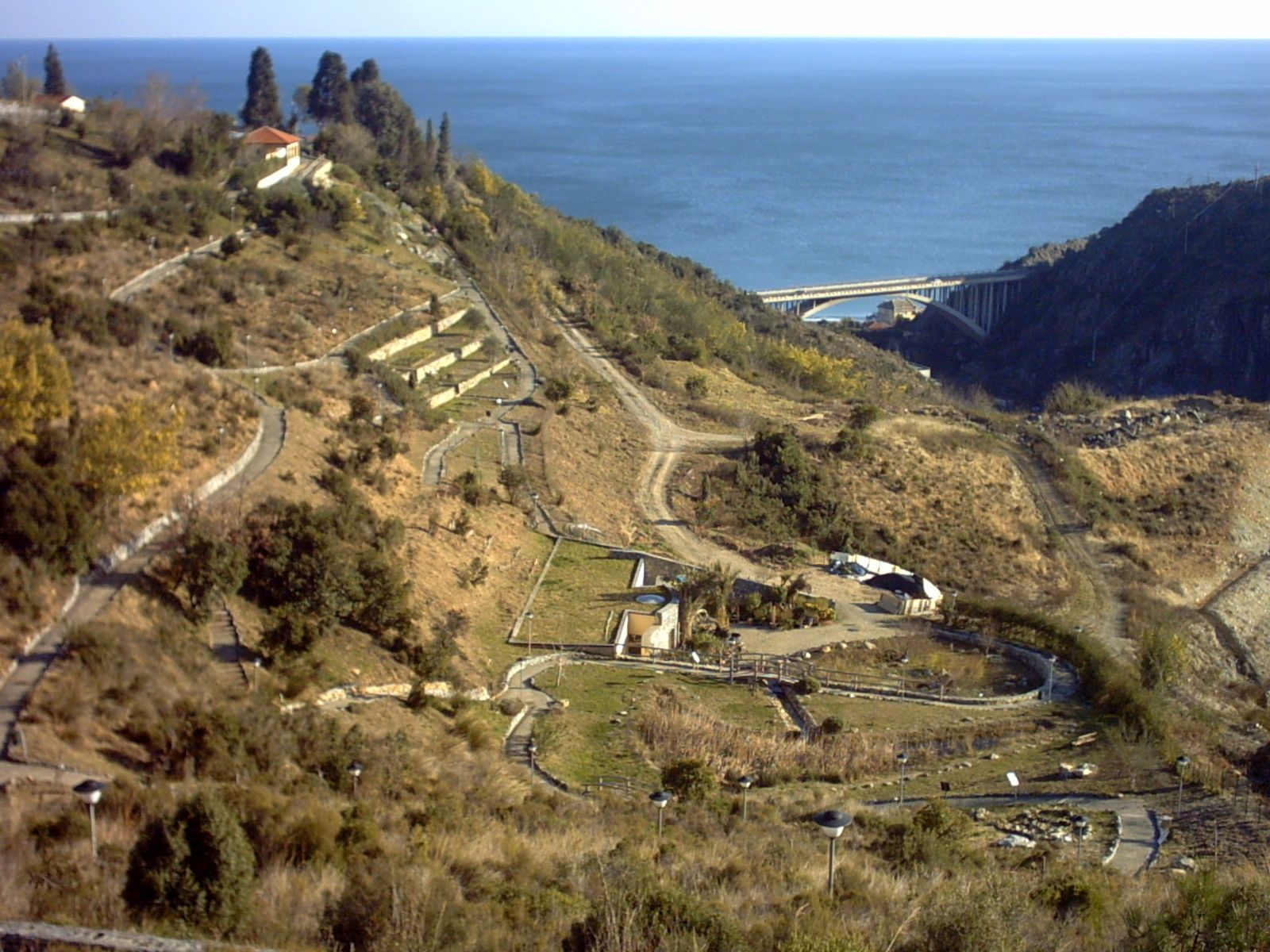
Botanical Garden of Villa Beuca in Cogoleto

The Orto Botanico di Villa Beuca (34,000 m²) is a botanical garden situated in Beuca, on a terrace nearly 100 meters above the sea located around the Villa Beuca not far from the slopes of the Regional Natural Park of Beigua, in Cogoleto, Province of Genoa, Liguria, Italy. The garden is currently open to the public by appointment on Saturday: for groups and schools, guided tours may be organized; an admission fee is charged.

The garden is divided into

- a didactic sector (Cornice Didattica) dedicated mainly to exotic species;
- the Ligurian habitat sector (11,000 m²) which is dedicated to the regional flora and vegetation including also the traditional agricultural landscape with its variety of vines and olives; it presents a set of Ligurian environments among which marine cliff, Mediterranean scrub, thermophilic woodlands, mesophilic woodlands, cultivated areas and wetlands
- a third area is distributed on a broad slope of natural vegetation (the Cornice spontanea), mainly shrubs, left unchanged.

== Exhibits ==
The Orto Botanico di Villa Beuca hosts a variety of plants from Liguria and around the world, including:

- Castanea sativa
- Quercus ilex
- Quercus pubescens
- Ruscus aculeatus
- Smilax aspera
- Viburnum tinus as well as Calluna vulgaris
- Convolvulus sabatius
- Cytisus scoparius
- Euphorbia spinosa subsp. ligustica
- Helichrysum italicum
- Hypericum perforatum
- Juniperus communis
- Narcissus pseudonarcissus
- Saponaria ocymoides
- Satureja montana
- Thymus pulegioides
- Ziziphus jujuba and Artemisia absinthium
- Borago officinalis
- Chelidonium majus
- Foeniculum vulgare
- Lavandula angustifolia
- Melissa officinalis
- Origanum vulgare
- Rosmarinus officinalis

== See also ==
- List of botanical gardens in Italy
