= Gonzalo Argote de Molina =

Spanish writer, historian, and genealogist

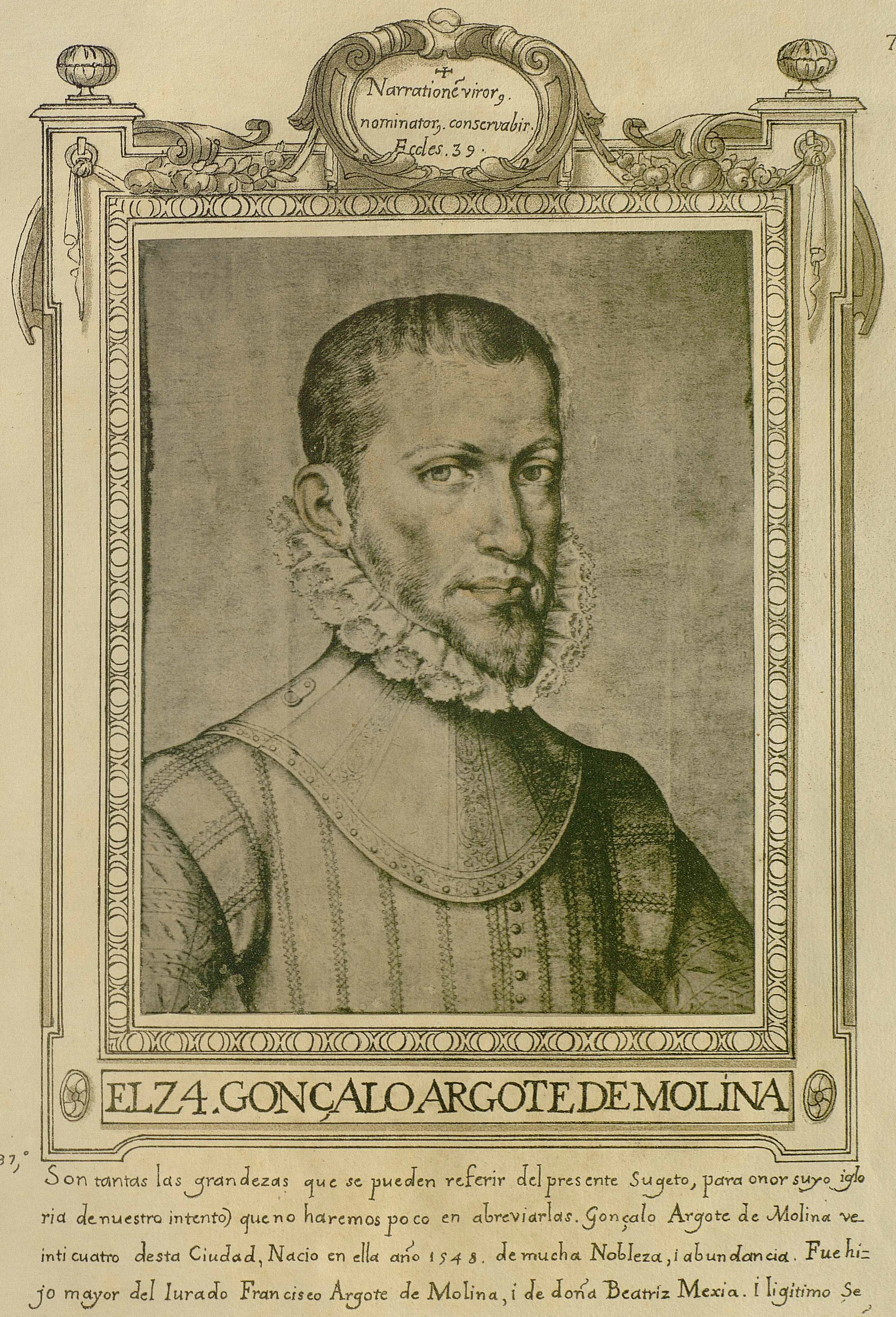
Gonzalo Argote de Molina.

Gonzalo Argote de Molina (1548–1596) was a Spanish writer, historian and genealogist.

== Biography ==
In 1564, he participated in the conquest of the Peñón de Vélez de la Gomera. The following year, at the age of sixteen, he obtained the rank of second lieutenant in the Andalusian militia. In 1569, he fought against the Moriscos during the Rebellion of the Alpujarras (1568–1571). He was appointed provincial and executive judge of Santa Hermandad in 1578, succeeding Diego Fernández de Andrada, although he had to wait two years of litigation until he took office. He also achieved the dignity of veinticuatro de Sevilla and the titles of lord of the Tower of Gil de Olid, the Tower of Don Jofre, and Daganzuelo.

He went to the Canary Islands in 1586 to marry Constanza de Herrera y Rojas, daughter of the first Marquis of Lanzarote, Agustín de Herrera y Rojas, in Lanzarote. On this island, he ordered the construction of the Franciscan convent of Teguise in 1588, of which only the church remains, a temple that was dedicated to Our Lady of Miraflores.

He defended Lanzarote from the Algerian attack of Murat Reis the Elder in 1586, who captured his wife and father-in-law, who had to be ransomed by Argote for a large sum of money. He also participated in the defense of the island of Gran Canaria from the corsair Francis Drake in 1595.
