= Cogoleto =

Cogoleto Cogoeuo
- Comune
- Comune di Cogoleto
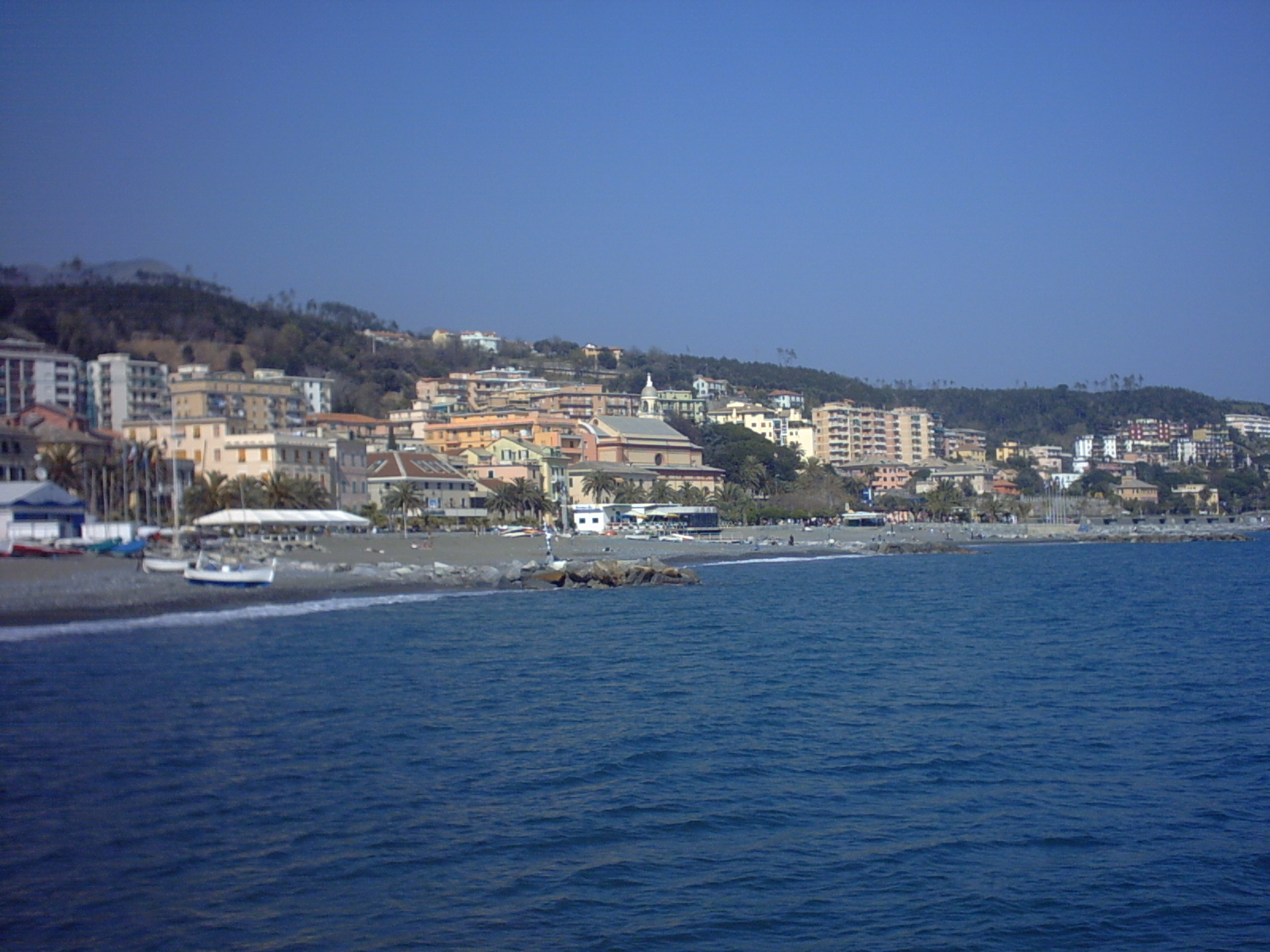

- Coat of arms

- Location within Italy Location within Liguria
- Coordinates: 44°23′22″N 8°38′46″E
- Country: Italy
- Region: Liguria
- Metropolitan city: Genoa (GE)
- Frazioni: Lerca, Sciarborasca, Pratozanino

Government
  - Mayor: Andrea D'Agostino

Area
  - Total: 20.36 km^{2} (7.86 sq mi)
- Elevation: 4 m (13 ft)

Population (30 June 2017)
  - Total: 9,119
  - Density: 447.9/km^{2} (1,160/sq mi)
- Demonym: Cogoletesi
- Time zone: UTC+1 (CET)
  - Summer (DST): UTC+2 (CEST)
- Postal code: 16016
- Dialing code: 010
- Patron saint: St. Lawrence
- Saint day: August 10
- Website: Official website

Cogoleto (Ligurian: Cogoeuo) is a comune (municipality) in the Metropolitan City of Genoa in the Italian region Liguria, located about 25 kilometres (16 mi) west of Genova. Its territory extends from the sea to the Ligurian Apennines; it is part of the Natural Regional Park of Monte Beigua.

Multiple 16th-century sources describe Cogoleto as the birthplace of Christopher Columbus, although his precise origins remain a matter of dispute.

== History ==
The area of Cogoleto is identified in the Roman Peutingerian Table as Hasta, with a bridge (destroyed in World War II by Allied bombings) existing here. The first mention of the town dates to 1039, and in 1091 it was included in Bonifacio del Vasto's Marquisate of Savona. In 1343 it was acquired by the Republic of Genoa.

On April 11, 1800 it was the seat of a battle between the French and Austrian armies. Cogoleto became part of the Kingdom of Sardinia in 1815, following its history in the unification of Italy and modern Italian history.

== Main sights ==
- Oratory of St. Lawrence, dating to the 13th century
- Orto Botanico di Villa Beuca, a botanical garden
- Imaginary birthplace of Christopher Columbus

== Twin towns ==
- Ober-Ramstadt, Germany, since 1960
- Santa Coloma de Gramenet, Spain, since 1997
- Olympia, Greece, since 2005
- Saint-André-les-Vergers, France, since 2005

== Nature conservation ==
Part of the municipality territory is within the boundaries of the Parco naturale regionale del Beigua.

== Notable people ==
Cogoleto is known for the Italian rappers Tedua and Izi.
