= Colle Scravaion =

Mountain pass in Italy

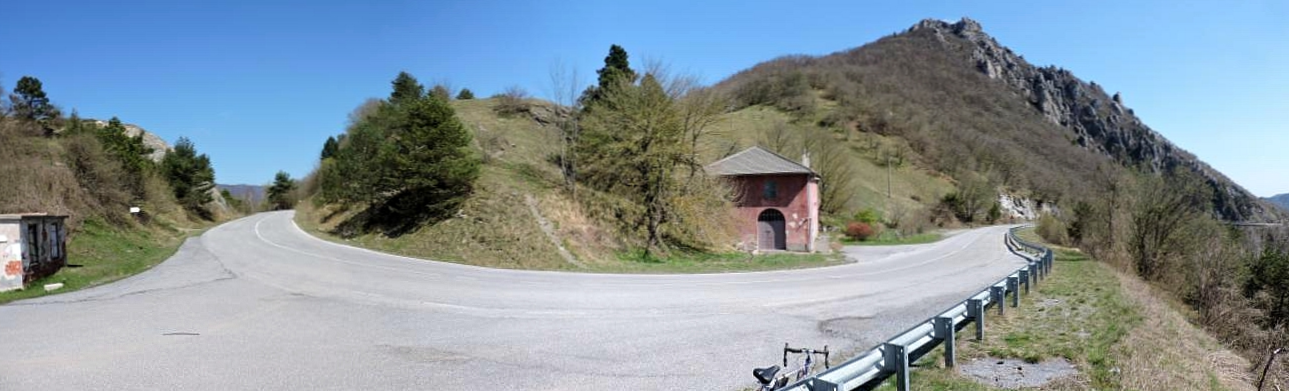
- Colle Scravaion and Rocca Barbena

- Location within Alps
- Elevation: 814 metres (2,671 ft)
- Traversed by: Provincial road nr.52 Barreassi Calizzano

Third Approach
- Location: Liguria, Italy
- Range: Ligurian Alps
- Coordinates: 44°09′34″N 8°07′13″E

The Colle Scravaion (814 m) is a mountain pass in the Province of Savona (Italy). It connects Castelvecchio di Rocca Barbena with Bardineto.

== Geography ==
The pass stands between Monte Lingo (1103 m, West) and Rocca Barbena. Located on the main chain of the Alps it connects the basin of the Ligurian Sea (South of the pass) and the Po plain.

Its northern slopes are occupied by vast beech woods, while the southern side is warmer and drier.

The pass can be reached following the provincial road nr.52 Barreassi Calizzano. Near the saddle stands a small picnic place and, not far away from it on the southern side, an old roadman's house.

== Cycling and hiking ==
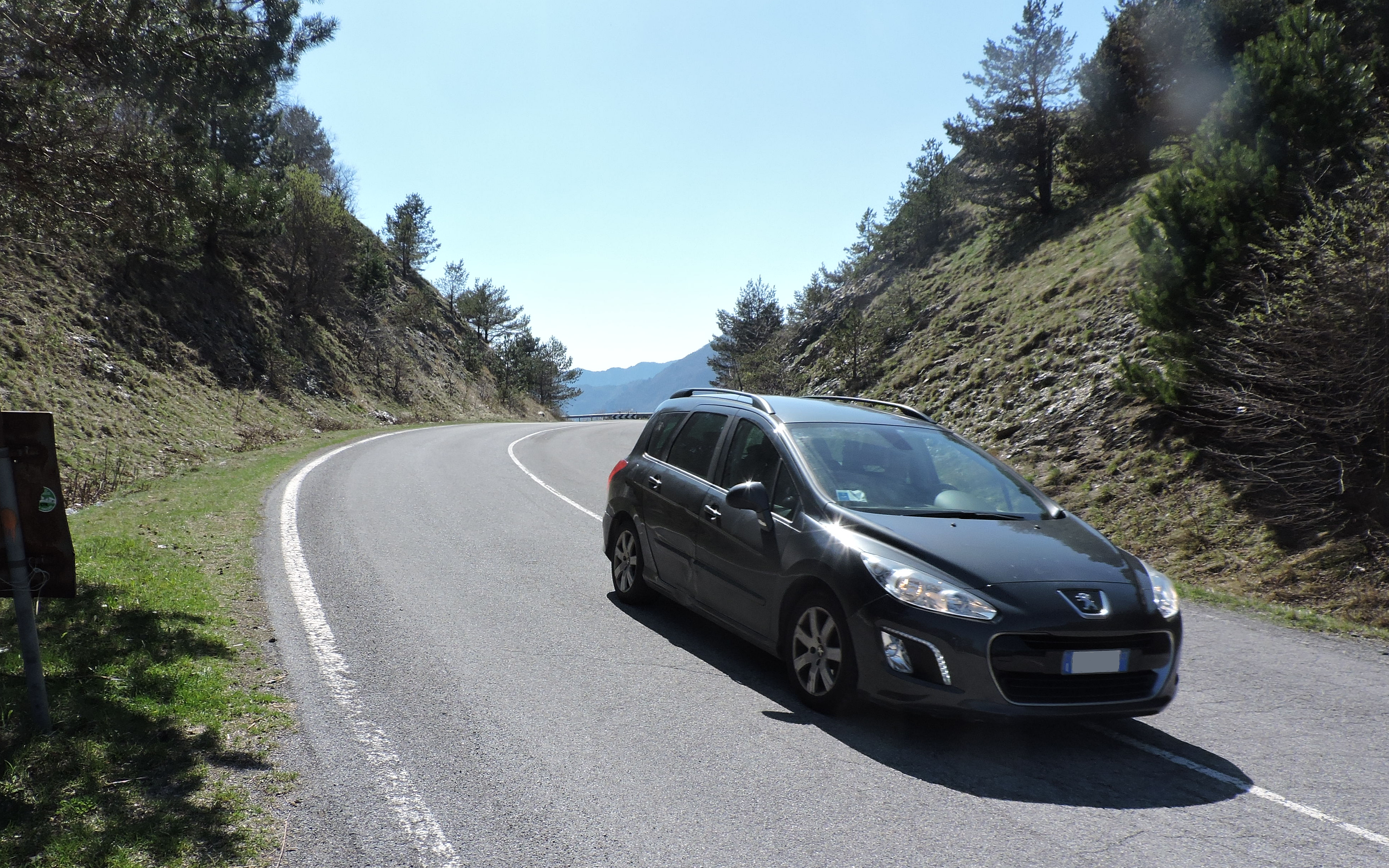
North side of the pass

The Scravaion pass is a popular cyclists' climb. The road from Zuccarello is considered pleasant because even if it's quite tiring it offers good views on the Riviera di Ponente and several shaded stretches It is part of a ciclist's racetrack called Anello dei tre gioghi (Ring of the three mountain passes) which also encompasses Giogo di Toirano and Balestrino pass. Another interesting round-trip combines Colle Scravaion climb with Colle San Bernardo and Colle del Quazzo.

Colle Scravaion is the starting point of an Alta Via dei Monti Liguri section.

== See also ==
- List of mountain passes
