= Rocca Barbena =

Mountain in Italy

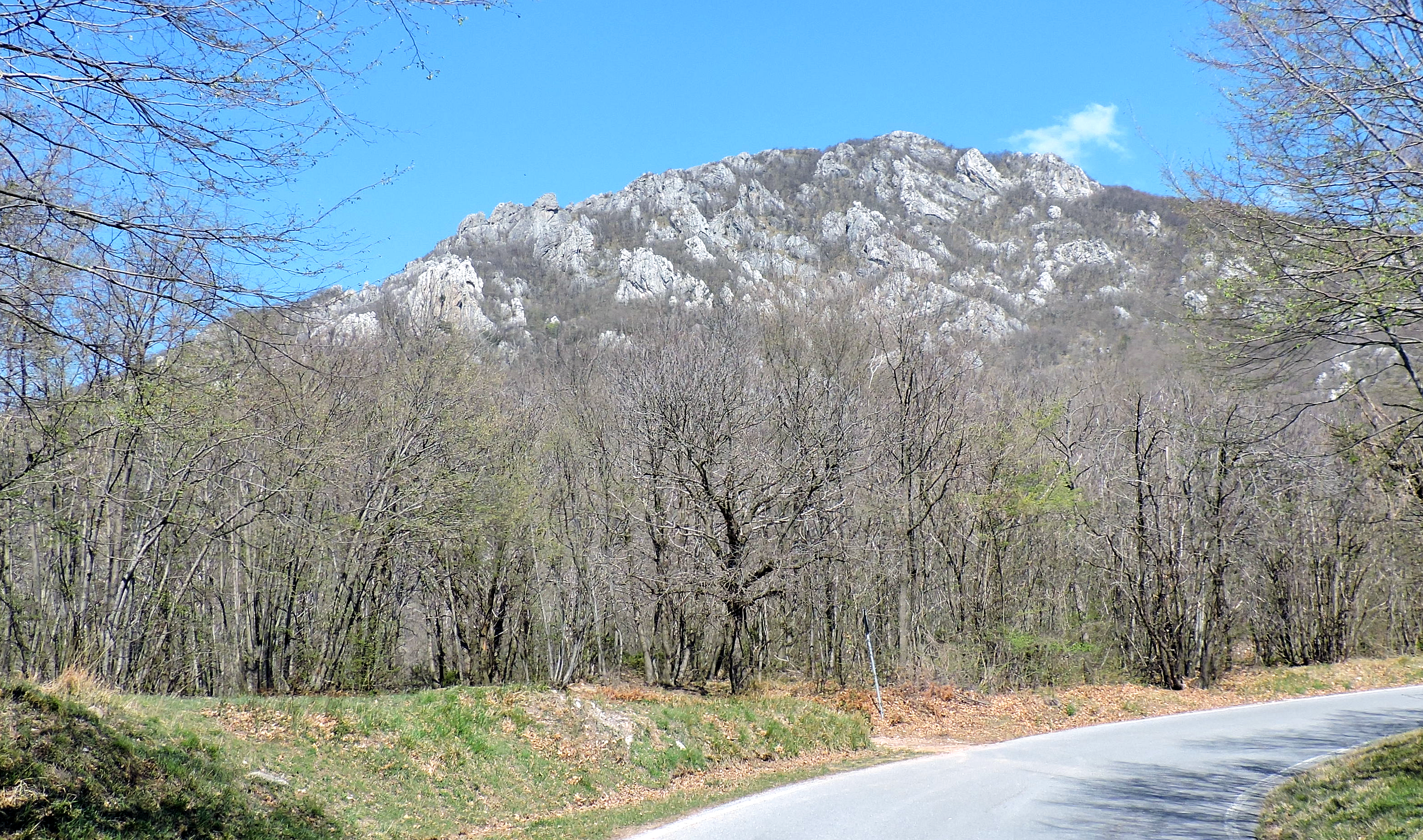
- Southern face

Highest point
- Elevation: 1,142 m (3,747 ft)
- Prominence: 328 m (1,076 ft)
- Isolation: 3.64 km (2.26 mi)
- Coordinates: 44°09′26.96″N 08°07′52.64″E

Geography
- Location within Alps
- Location: Liguria, Italy
- Parent range: Ligurian Alps

Geology
- Mountain type: limestone

Climbing
- First ascent: ancestral
- Easiest route: hike from Colle Scravaion

Rocca Barbena is a 1,142-metre (3,747 ft) high mountain in the Ligurian Prealps (part of the Ligurian Alps) in Italy.

== Geography ==
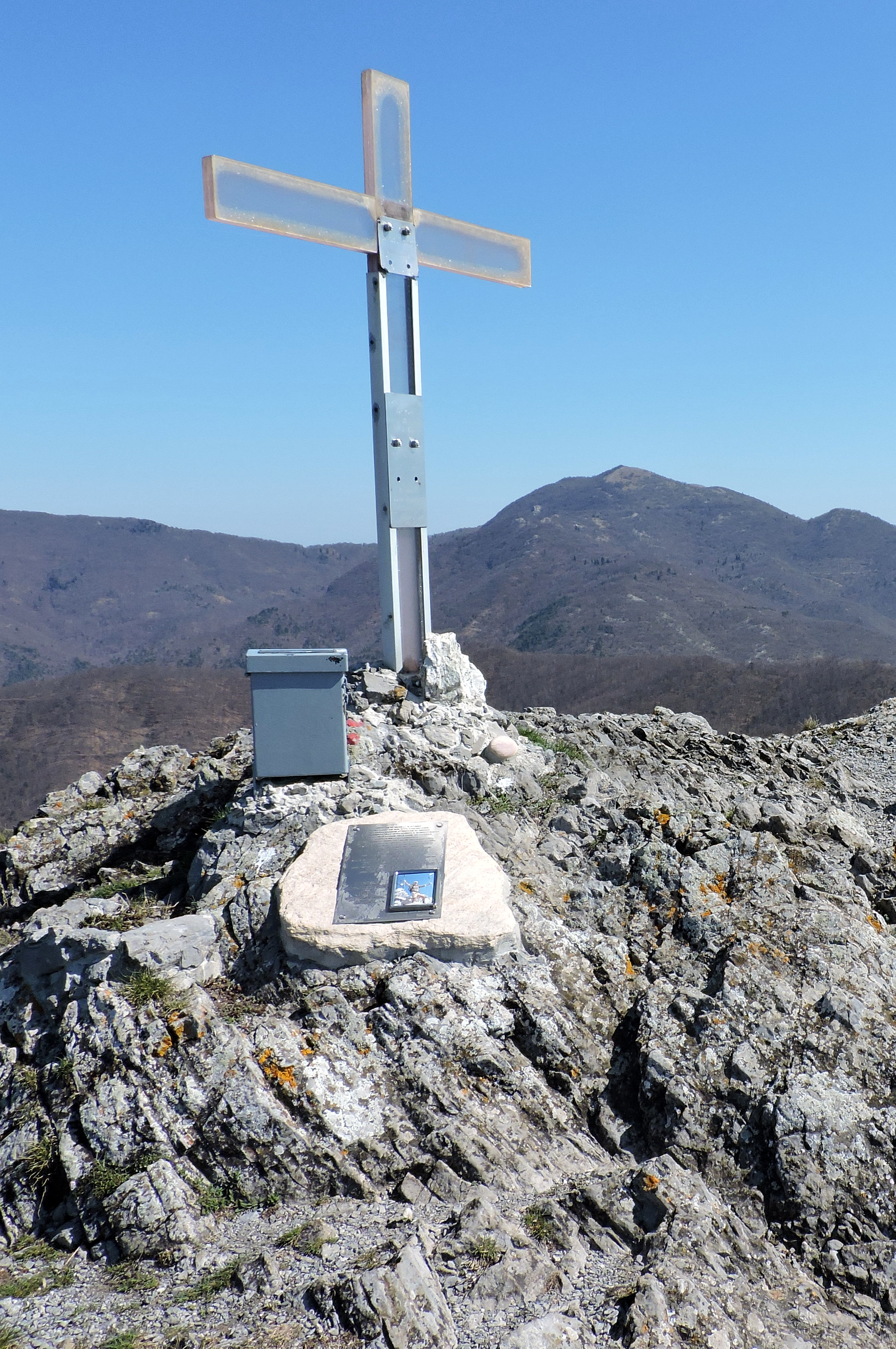
Summit cross

The mountain is located on the main chain of the Alps and dominates from North Castelvecchio di Rocca Barbena. Its northern cliffs face on Bardineto and Bormida valley. The summit stands on the water divide between Ligurian Sea and River Po basins. Going NW Colle Scravaion (814 m) divides the Rocca Barbena from the neighbouring Monte Lingo (1103 m) while looking East the water divide goes on with colletto Bianco (935 m), Monte Sebanco (983 m) and Giogo di Toirano. Unlikely other rounded and woody mountains in the area Rocca Barbena is rocky and locally precipitous, above all on its North face.

Administratively the Rocca Barbena belongs to the municipality of Castelvecchio di Rocca Barbena. On its summit that shows both the Ligurian Alps and Italian Riviera, stands a cross with a metallic box sheltering a summit register.

== Access to the summit ==
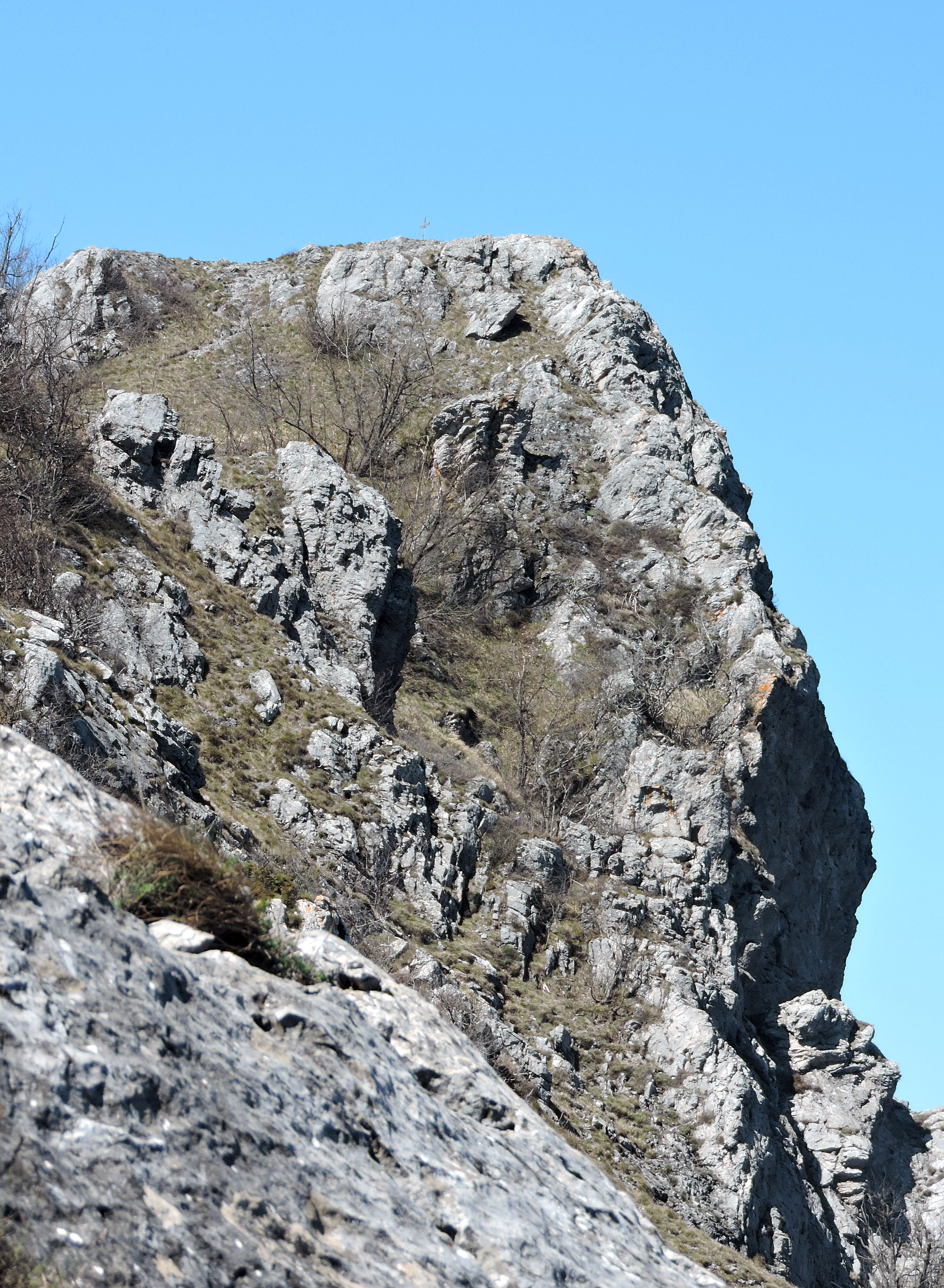
North cliffs

Rocca Barbena can be reached from Colle Scravaion following a waymarked footpath. The route does not require alpinistic skills even if there are some very steep stretches and in the Italian scale of hiking difficulty, the route is rated E (Escursionisti, namely suitable for normal hikers). It is also possible accessing the summit via East ridge from the Colletto Bianco.

Colletto Bianco and Colle Scravaion are linked by the Alta Via dei Monti Liguri, a trekking route which passes at the base of the northern cliffs of the Rocca Barbena.

== Nature conservation ==
The mountain and its surrounding area are part of an area protetta provinciale (protected provincial area) established by the Provincia di Savona mainly in order to preserve environmental produced by karstic erosion as rock pinnacles, ponors and caves. The area also belongs to the SIC (Site of Community Importance) called Monte Ravinet-Rocca Barbena - code IT 1324011.
