= Giogo di Toirano =

Mountain pass in Italy

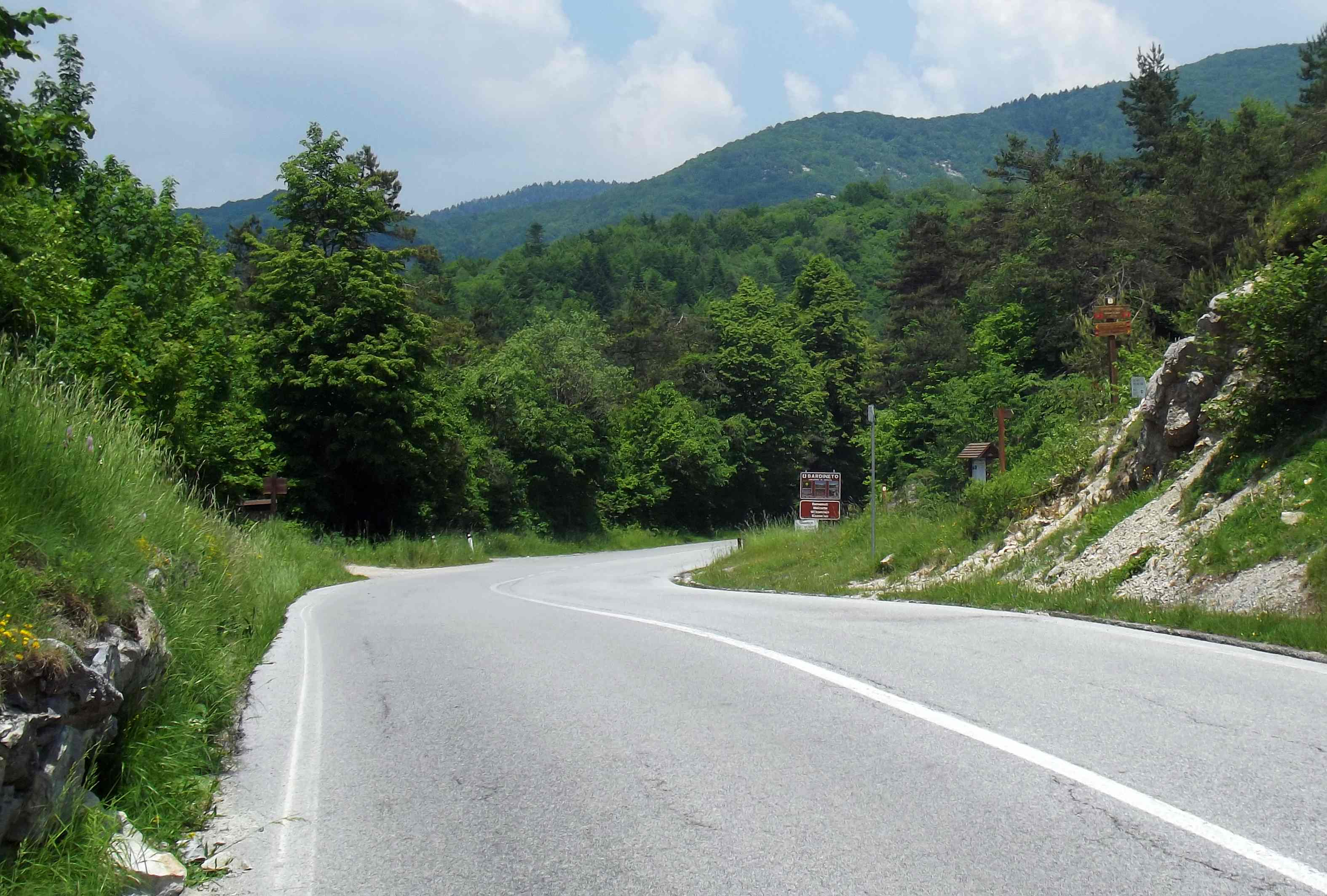
- The pass from its southern side

- Location within Alps
- Elevation: 801 metres (2,628 ft)
- Traversed by: Provincial road nr.60 Borghetto Santo Spirito - Bardineto

Third Approach
- Location: Liguria, Italy
- Range: Ligurian Alps
- Coordinates: 44°10′08″N 8°09′36″E

The Giogo di Toirano (801 m) is a mountain pass in the Province of Savona (Italy). It connects Toirano with Bardineto.

== Toponymy ==
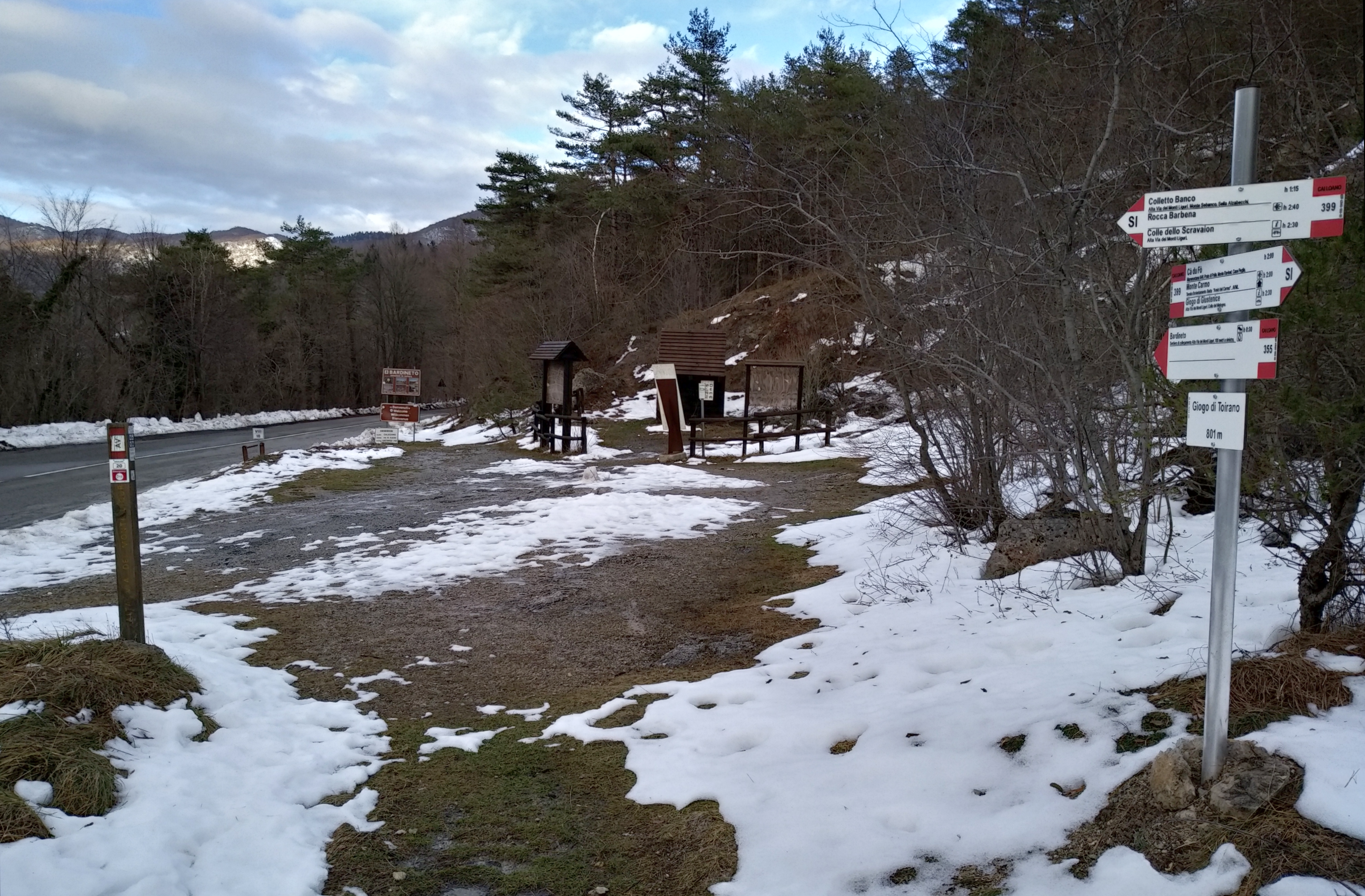
Late autumn view

In Italian the main meaning of giogo is yoke, but it also means gap, mountain pass; Toirano is a village on the southern side of the pass.

== Geography ==
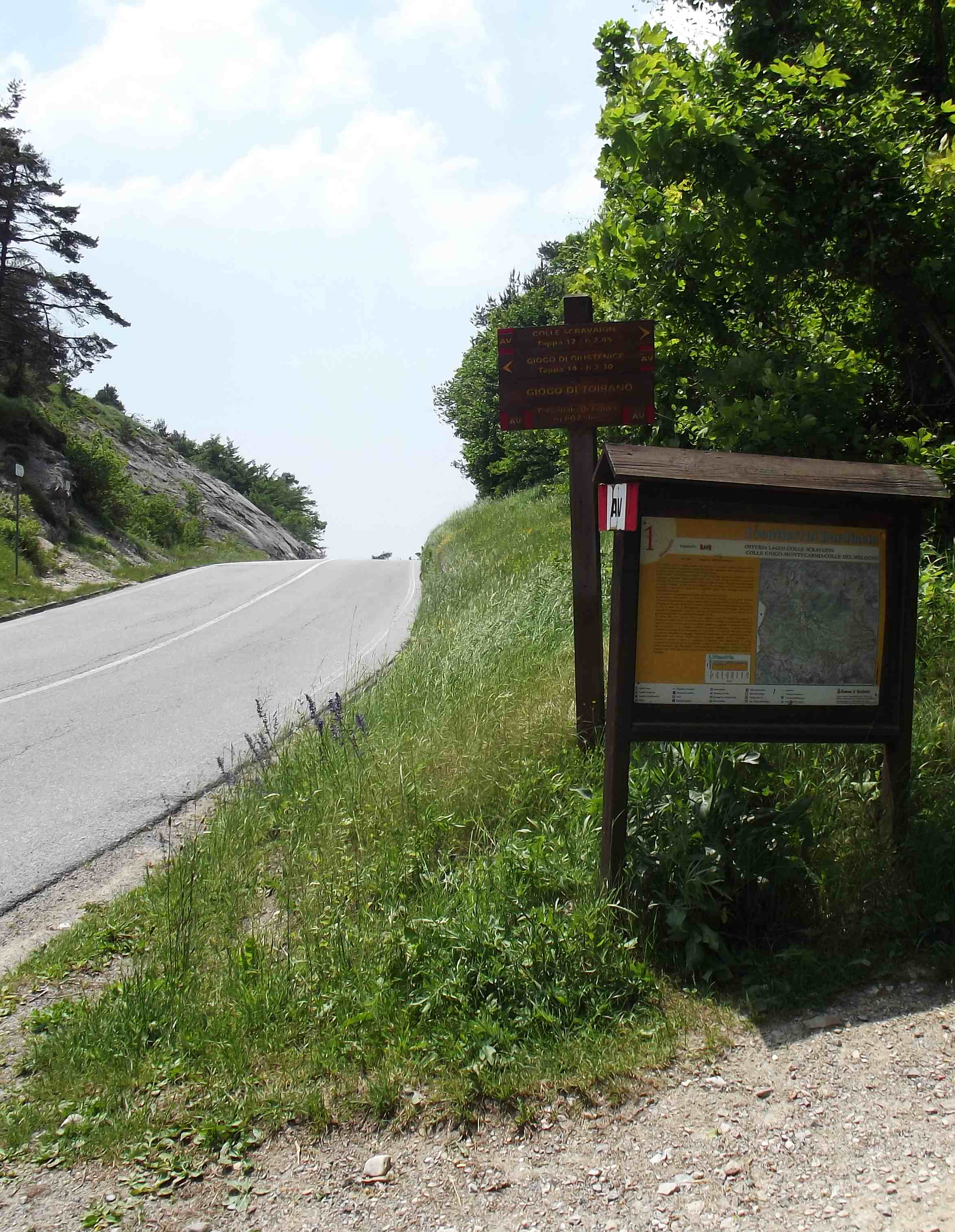
North side of the pass

The pass stands between Monte Sebanco (983.9 m, West) and Bric Pagliarina (1.213 m, a subpeak of Monte Carmo). Located on the main chain of the Alps it connects the basin of the Ligurian Sea (South of the pass) and the Po plain.

Its northern side is mainly occupied by beech woods, while the southern side is drier and warmer. Near the saddle stands a picnic place and some information panels about the peculiarities of the surrounding environment. The pass can be reached following the provincial road nr.60 Borghetto Santo Spirito - Bardineto.

== Cycling and hiking ==
The Giogo di Toirano is a popular cyclists' climb. The road from Borghetto Santo Spirito is considered an engaging climb and offers good views on the Italian Riviera. Car traffic is very sparse but also motorbikers highly appreciate this stretch of road It is part of a ciclist's racetrack called Anello dei tre gioghi (Ring of the three mountain passes) which also encompasses Colle Scravaion and Balestrino pass.

Giogo di Toirano is the starting point of an Alta Via dei Monti Liguri section.

== See also ==
- List of mountain passes
