= Magnetto =

Magnetto is a surname. Notable people with the surname include:

- Daniela Magnetto (born 1996), Italian cyclist
- Héctor Magnetto (born 1944), Argentine businessman
- Ugo Magnetto (1902–1984), Italian footballer
