= Raid on Ceriale and Borghetto =

1637 Algerian incursion

Date	Summer 1637
Location	Ceriale, Borghetto, Italy
Result	Algerian victory

Belligerents
Republic of Genoa	Regency of Algiers

Commanders and leaders
Unknown	Unknown

Strength
Unknown	8 Galleys

Casualties and losses
337 Enslaved	Unknown

The Raid on Ceriale and Borghetto was made by the Regency of Algiers against the Republic of Genoa in the Summer of 1637.

== Raid ==
In the year 1637, a significant Algerian incursion along the Ligurian coast, specifically targeting Ceriale and Borghetto, resulted in the capture of approximately 337 individuals, encompassing men, women, and children. a considerable portion of these captives died due to harsh conditions or remained unredeemed.
