= Varatella =

Stream in Liguria, Italy

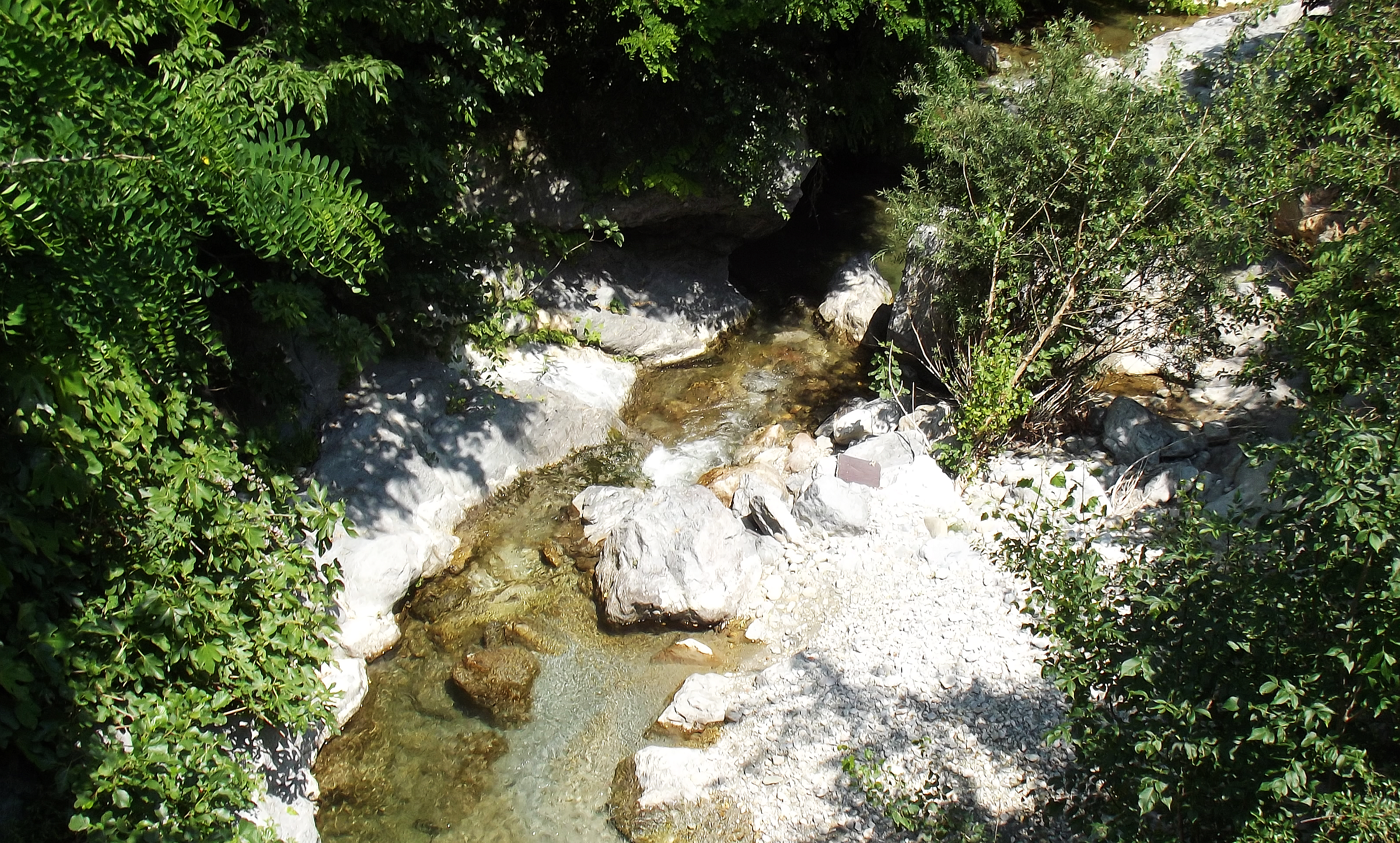

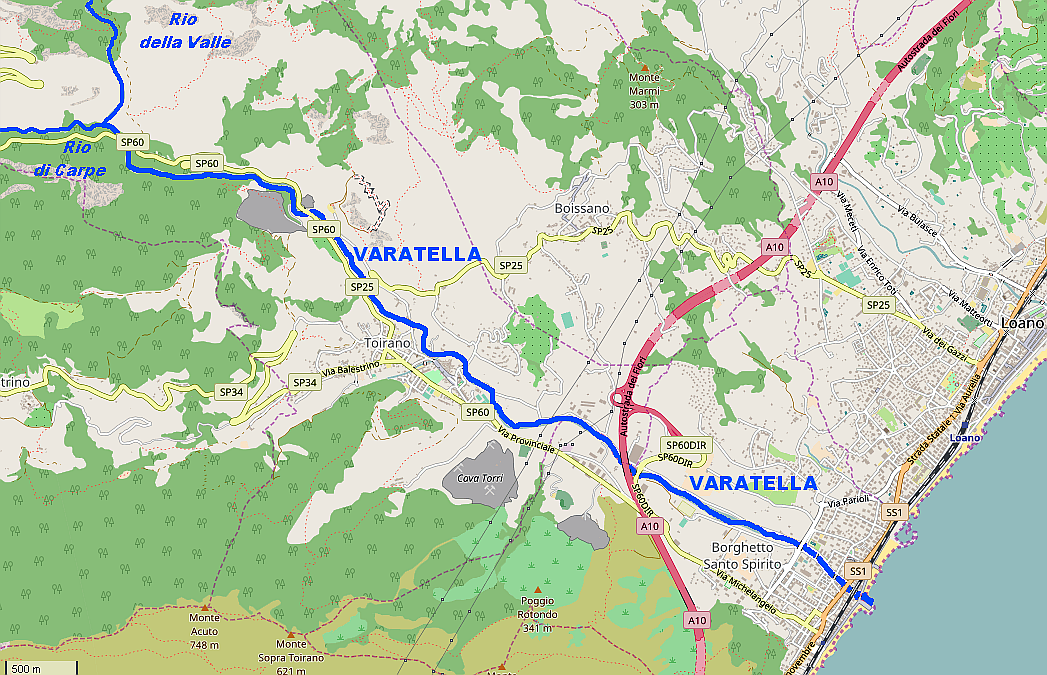

Location
- Country: Italy

Physical characteristics
- Source
  - location: Ligurian Alps
  - elevation: 170 m (560 ft)
- Mouth: Ligurian Sea
  - location: Borghetto Santo Spirito (SV)
  - coordinates: 44°06′43″N 8°14′46″E
  - elevation: 0 m (0 ft)
- Length: 7 km (4.3 mi)
- Basin size: 44 km^{2} (17 sq mi)

The Varatella (or Varatello) is a 7-kilometre (4.3 mi) stream of Liguria (Italy).

== Geography ==
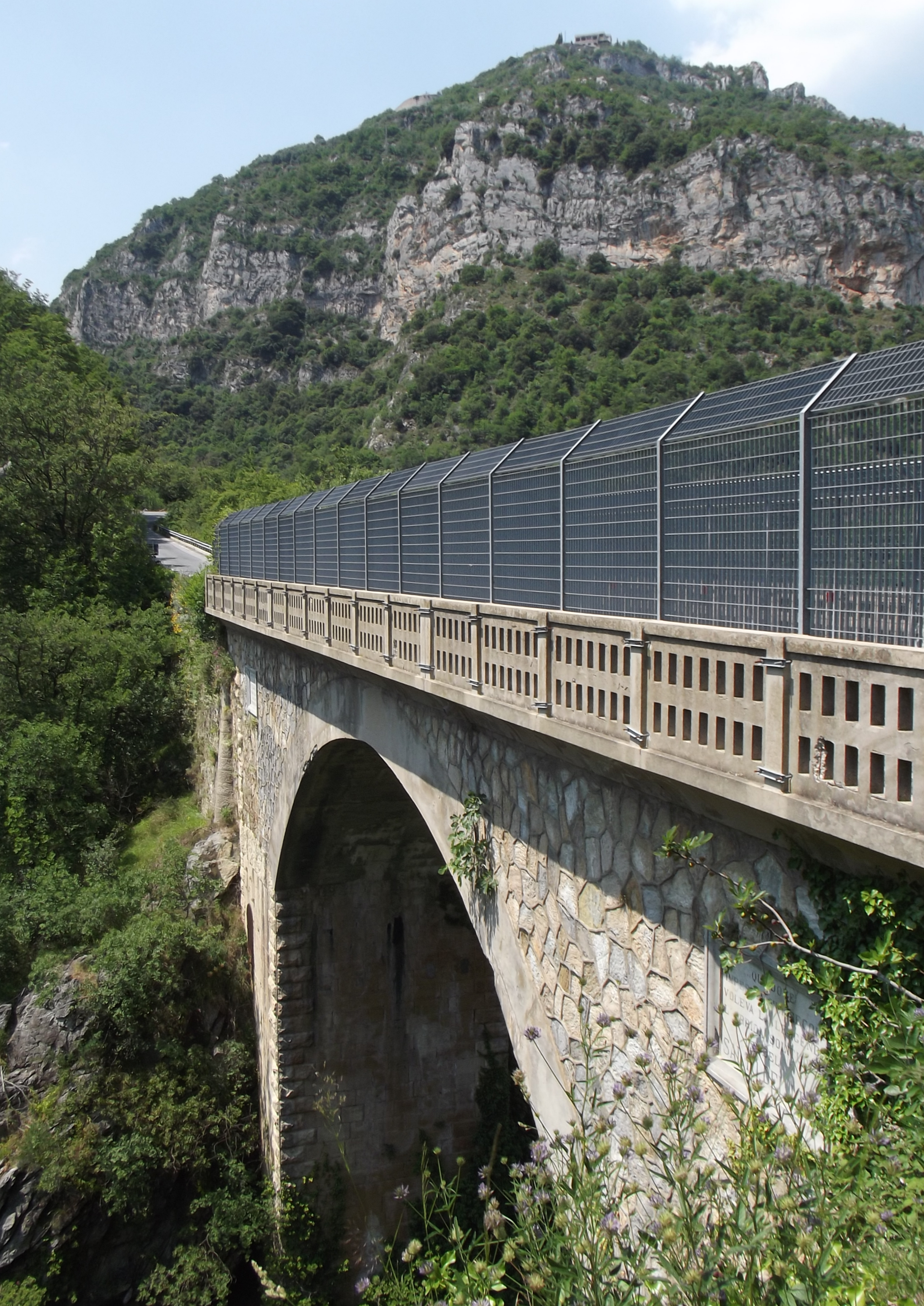
A bridge on the Varatella

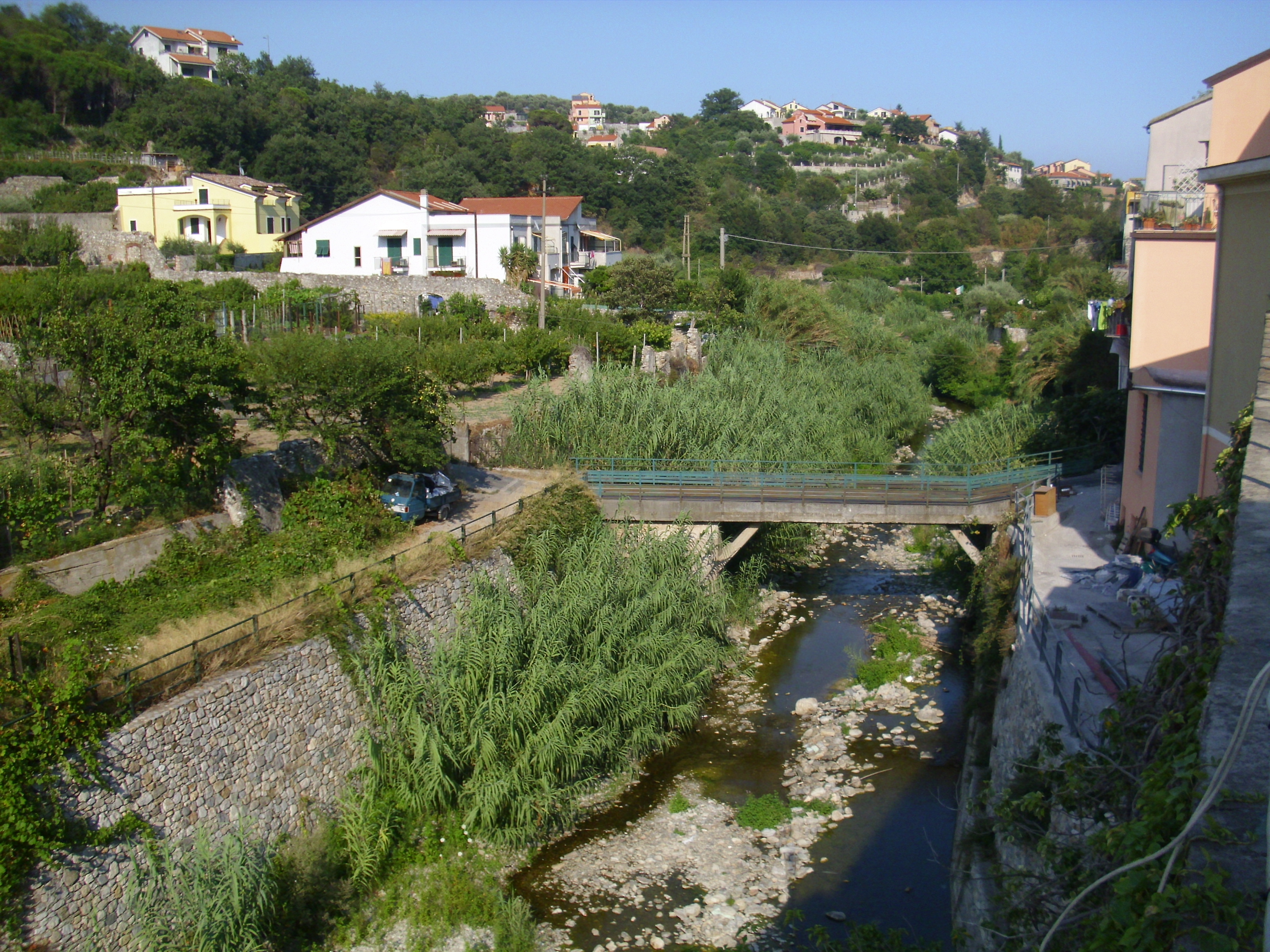
The Varatella in Toirano

The river is formed at 170 m (560 ft) elevation by the confluence of two streams, Rio della Valle and Rio di Carpe, in the comune of Toirano. The river then flows through the Valle Varatella and crosses the centre of Toirano, where it receives from right the waters of rio Barescione, its main tributary. Heading south-east the Varatella reaches Borghetto Santo Spirito and ends its course in the Ligurian Sea, after being crossed by Autostrada A10, Genoa–Ventimiglia railway and Aurelia national road.

Varatella basin (44 square kilometres (17 sq mi)) is totally included in the Province of Savona.

=== Main tributaries ===
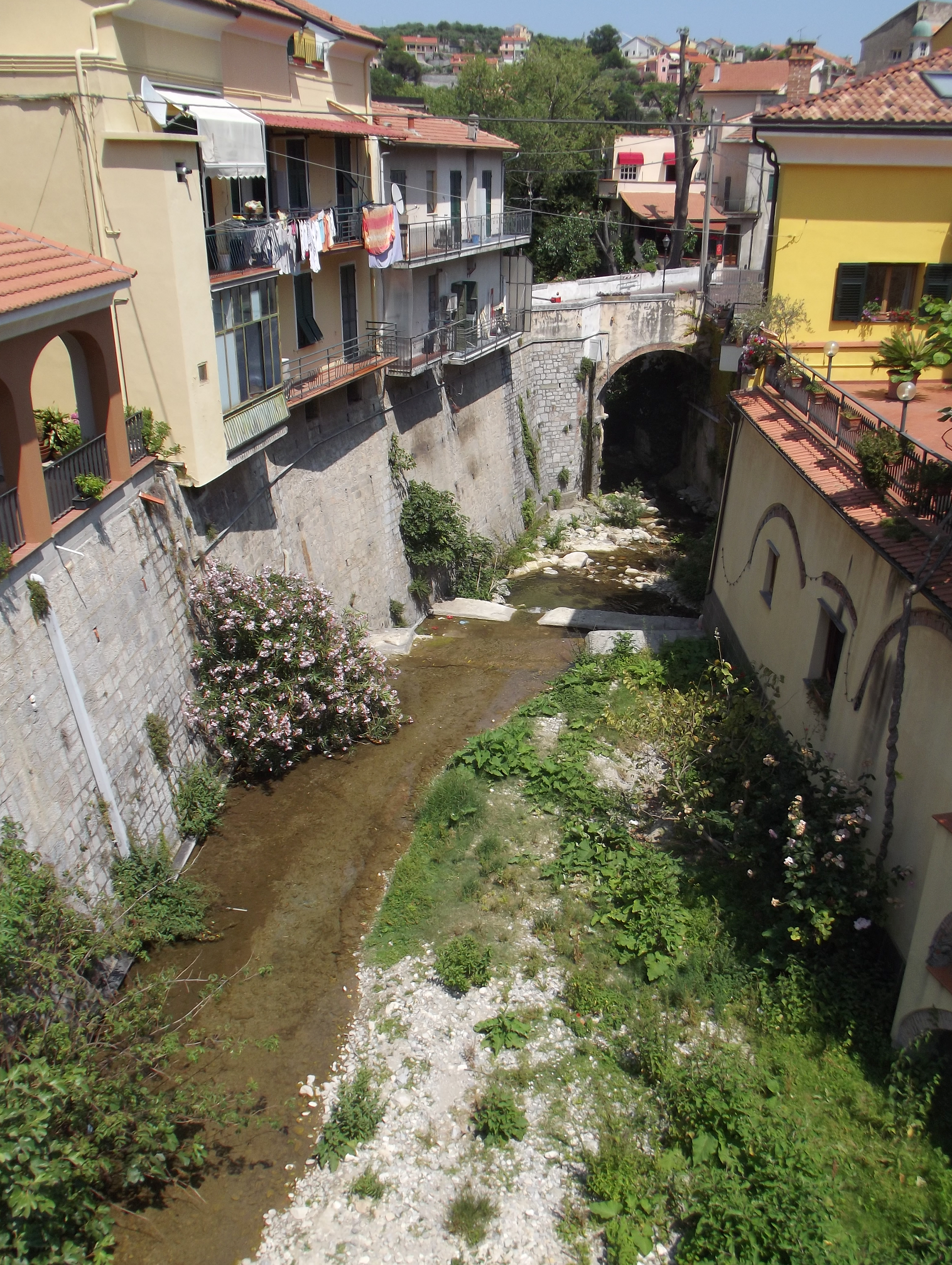
Rio Barescione.

- Left hand:
  - Rio della valle
  - Rio delle Banchette
- Right hand:
  - Rio di Carpe
  - Rio Barescione
  - Rio di Riva

== See also ==
- List of rivers of Italy
