= Boissano =

- Comune
- Comune di Boissano
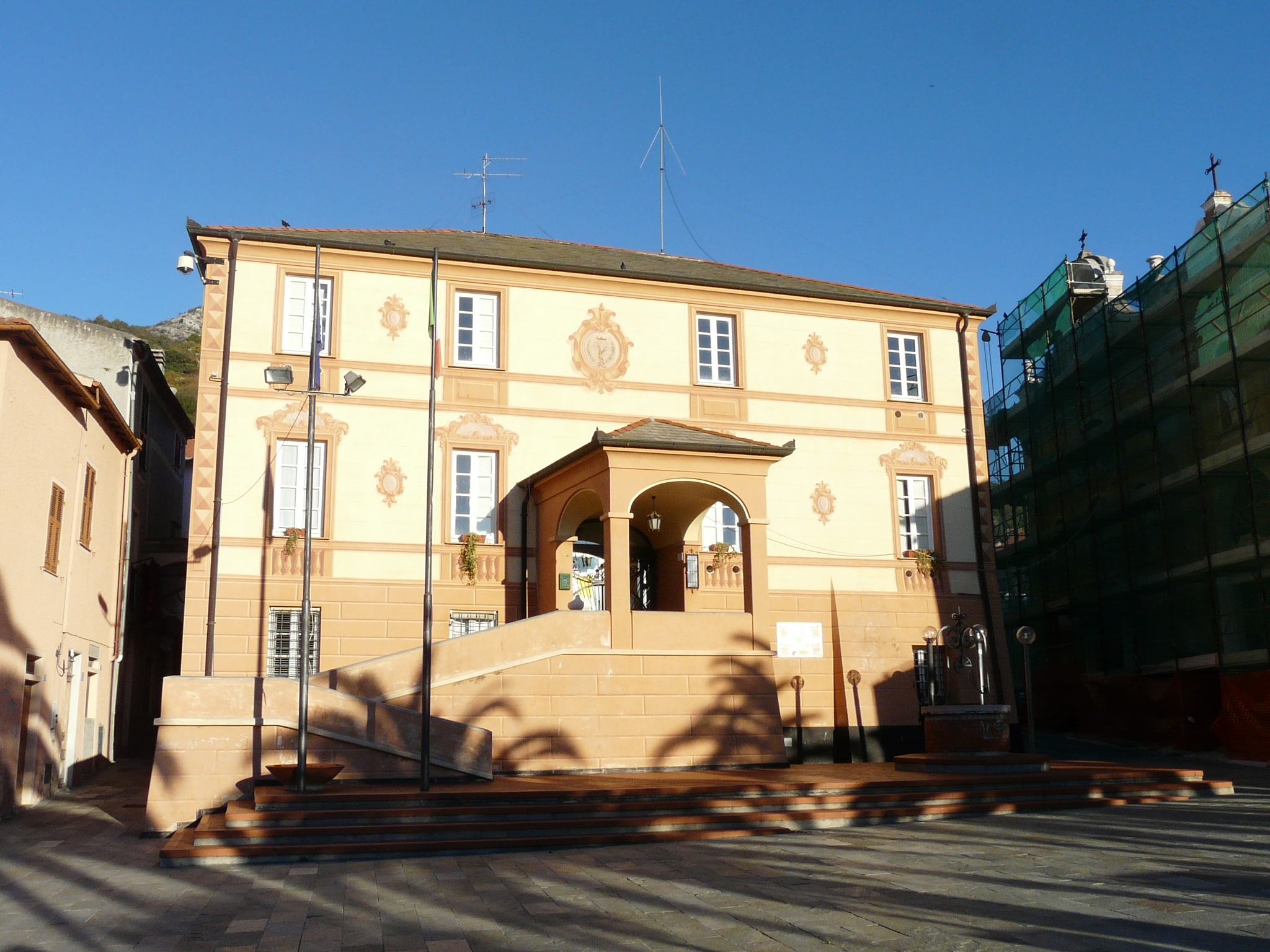
- Town hall

- Coat of arms

- Location within Italy Location within Liguria
- Coordinates: 44°8′N 8°14′E
- Country: Italy
- Region: Liguria
- Province: Savona (SV)

Government
  - Mayor: Rita Olivari

Area
  - Total: 8.35 km^{2} (3.22 sq mi)
- Elevation: 121 m (397 ft)

Population (30 April 2017)
  - Total: 2,474
  - Density: 296/km^{2} (767/sq mi)
- Demonym: Boissanesi
- Time zone: UTC+1 (CET)
  - Summer (DST): UTC+2 (CEST)
- Postal code: 17020
- Dialing code: 0182
- Website: Official website

Boissano (Ligurian: Buintsan or Boinsan, locally Buinzan) is a comune (municipality) in the Province of Savona in the Italian region Liguria, located about 60 kilometres (37 mi) southwest of Genoa and about 25 kilometres (16 mi) southwest of Savona.

Boissano borders the following municipalities: Bardineto, Borghetto Santo Spirito, Loano, Pietra Ligure, and Toirano.
