= Monica Giuliano =

Italian politician (born 1973)

President of the Province of Savona
- In office 13 October 2014 – 12 November 2018
- Preceded by: Angelo Vaccarezza
- Succeeded by: Pierangelo Olivieri

Mayor of Vado Ligure
- In office 27 May 2014 – 30 August 2023
- Preceded by: Attilio Caviglia
- Succeeded by: Fabio Gilardi

Personal details
- Born: 9 May 1973 (age 53) Savona, Liguria, Italy
- Party: Democrats of the Left; Democratic Party; Cambiamo! Lega
- Education: University of Genoa

Monica Giuliano (born 9 May 1973) is an Italian politician who served as mayor of Vado Ligure from 2014 to 2023 and as president of the Province of Savona from 2014 to 2018.

== Life and career ==
Giuliano graduated in economics from the University of Genoa in 1999, and subsequently worked as an accountant for public and private companies.

In 1999, she was elected to the municipal council of Vado Ligure for the Democrats of the Left. Until 2004, she served as assessor for finance and commerce, later taking responsibility for urban planning. In 2008, she became deputy mayor with responsibility for public works.

Giuliano was elected mayor of Vado Ligure in 2014 and was re-elected in 2019. In October 2014, she was elected president of the Province of Savona under the new Delrio law. She also served as a member of the national and regional governing committees of the Union of Italian Provinces (UPI).

In 2020, Giuliano broke with the Democratic Party and endorsed Giovanni Toti in the Ligurian regional election. In August 2023, she was appointed by Toti, then president of Liguria, as commissioner of the Ligurian Regional Waste Agency (ARLIR).

In 2026, Giuliano joined the staff of Ligurian regional councillor Paolo Ripamonti of the Lega.
