= Angelo Vaccarezza =

Italian politician (born 1965)

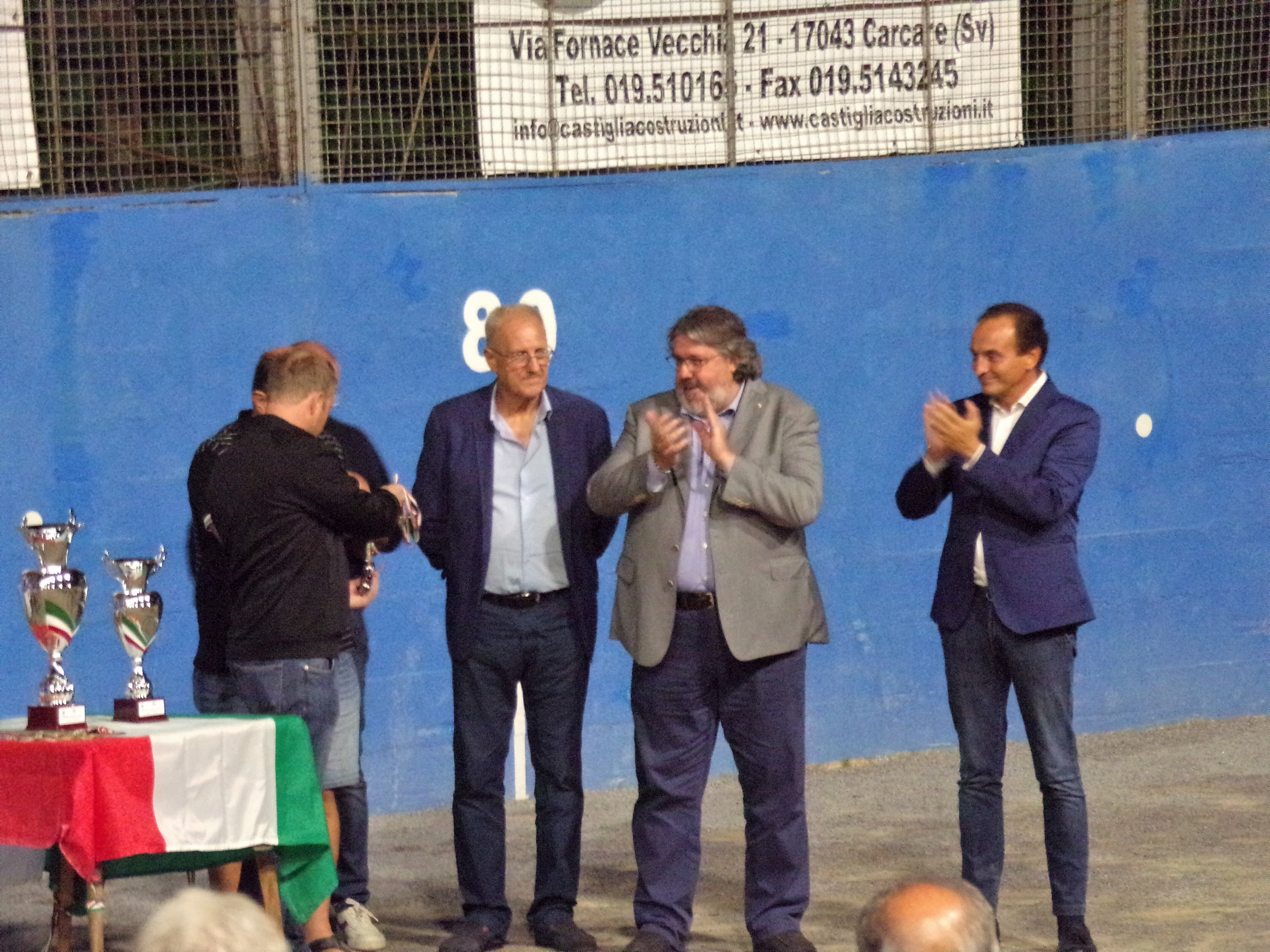

Member of the Regional Council of Liguria
- Incumbent
- Assumed office 1 July 2015

President of the Province of Savona
- In office 11 July 2009 – 13 October 2014
- Preceded by: Marco Bertolotto
- Succeeded by: Monica Giuliano

Personal details
- Born: 30 July 1965 (age 60) Albenga, Province of Savona, Italy
- Party: Christian Democracy (1985-1994); Forza Italia (1994-2009); The People of Freedom (2009-2013); Forza Italia (since 2013)

Angelo Vaccarezza (born 1965) is an Italian politician serving as a member of the Regional Council of Liguria since 2015.

== Biography ==
Vaccarezza became involved in politics as a young man, having taken up a local council post after periods of service at the Teletrill communications firm and a brief period as a broker. He became involved in the Forza Italia movement, supporting the leadership of Claudio Scajola.

== Political career ==
Vaccarezza has been involved in politics in Loano for 21 years, first as a councillor and later as an assessor; he was on 30 May 2006 elected to a second term as mayor of the city with a 60% share of the vote. In provincial elections in June 2009 he scored a ballot victory over Democratic Party candidate Michele Boffa to become President of the Province of Savona.

In 2015, Vaccarezza was elected to the Regional Council of Liguria. He was reconfirmed in 2020 and 2024.

Political offices
Preceded by Marco Bertolotto	President of the Province of Savona; 2009-2014	Succeeded by Monica Giuliano
