= Castelvecchio di Rocca Barbena =

- Comune
- Comune di Castelvecchio di Rocca Barbena
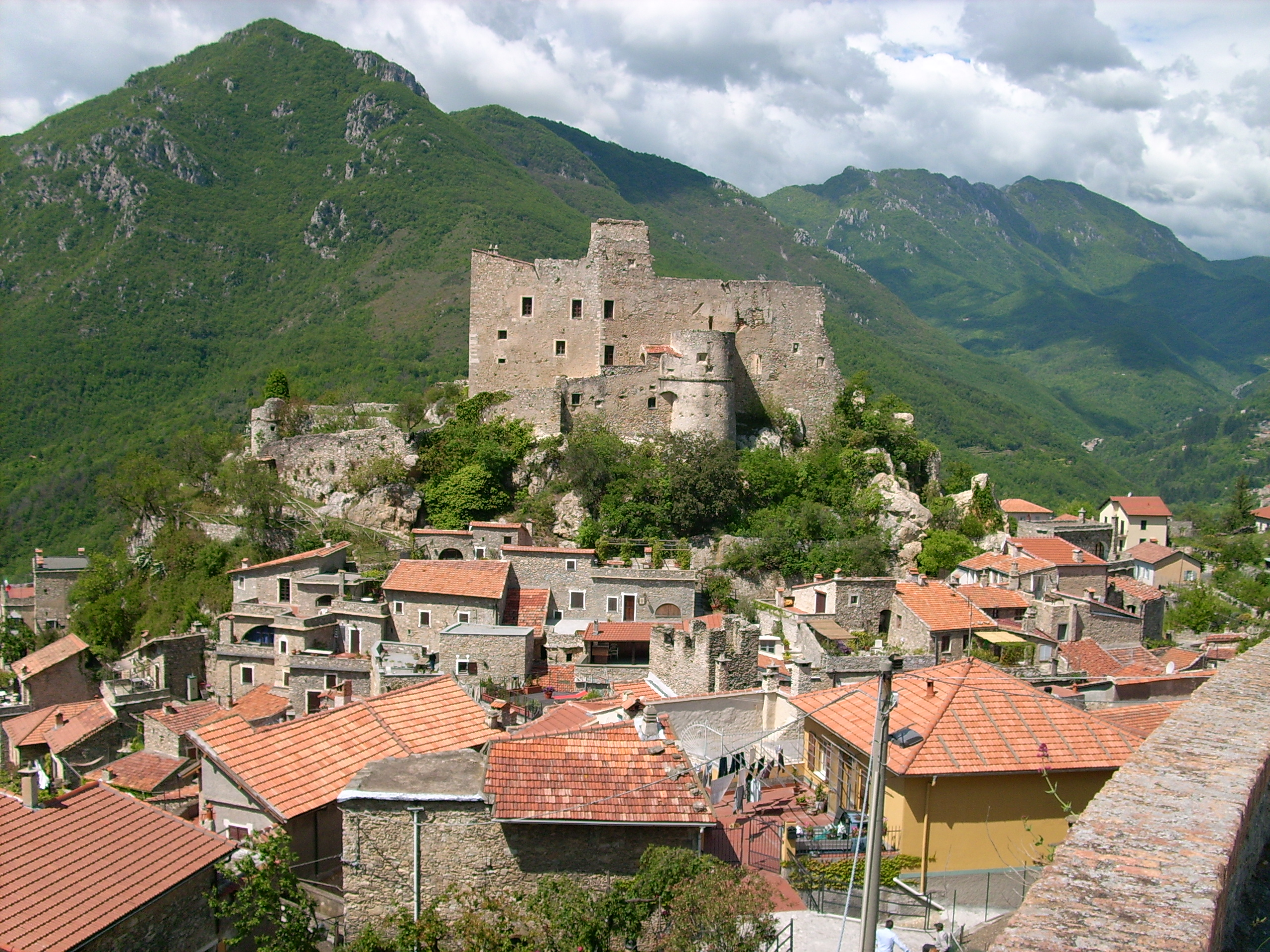

- Coat of arms

- Location within Italy Location within Liguria
- Coordinates: 44°8′N 8°7′E
- Country: Italy
- Region: Liguria
- Province: Savona (SV)

Government
  - Mayor: Marino Milani

Area
  - Total: 16.4 km^{2} (6.3 sq mi)
- Elevation: 420 m (1,380 ft)

Population (31 May 2022)
  - Total: 127
  - Density: 7.74/km^{2} (20.1/sq mi)
- Demonym: Castelvecchiesi
- Time zone: UTC+1 (CET)
  - Summer (DST): UTC+2 (CEST)
- Postal code: 17034
- Dialing code: 0182
- Website: Official website

Castelvecchio di Rocca Barbena (Ligurian: Castrevëgio) is a comune (municipality) in the Province of Savona in the Italian region Liguria, located about 70 kilometres (43 mi) southwest of Genoa and about 35 kilometres (22 mi) southwest of Savona. It is one of I Borghi più belli d'Italia ("The most beautiful villages of Italy").

== Geography ==
Castelvecchio di Rocca Barbena borders the following municipalities: Balestrino, Bardineto, Erli, Garessio, Toirano, and Zuccarello. The village gets its name from a nearby mountain called Rocca Barbena.

== History ==
In the 12th and 13th centuries, Castelvecchio was part of the fiefdom of the Marquis of Clavesana. Gradually it lost importance as the centre of local feudal power shifted to the nearby fief of Zuccarello. In 1623 Castelvecchio was acquired by the Kingdom of Piedmont-Sardinia under the House of Savoy. After the castle was besieged in 1672, the Castelvecchio was ceded to the Republic of Genoa. In 1746, following the Spanish War of Succession a failed attempt was made by the Piedmontese army to take the village and the castle. In 1815 Castelvecchio once more became part of the Kingdom of Piedmont-Sardinia and following Italian unification in 1861 it became part of the Kingdom of Italy.

== Architecture ==
The village is characterised by old stone houses clustered around an ancient castle.

The Castello dei Clavesana, which dates from around the 9th-10th centuries, towers over the village on a large rocky promontory. From the 11th century onwards, the castle was developed and village was constructed outside the castle walls.

Castelvecchio di Rocca Barbena has been named as one of the most beautiful villages of Italy by the association "I Borghi più belli d’Italia".

== Sports ==
The area around Castelvecchio di Rocca Barbena is perfect for hiking and mountain biking with many access roads and dedicated mountain biking trails.

There is a sports association called the A.S.D Castelvecchio Rockriders who maintain and build new mountain bike paths. Working under the brand Wild Rock MTB together with Bardineto Outdoor they are bringing more mountain bikers to the area and in turn increasing the economy within the towns.

== See also ==
- Colle Scravaion
