= List of presidents of the Province of Savona =

President of the Province of Savona
- Presidente della Provincia di Savona
- Incumbent; Mauro Demichelis since 23 November 2026
- Term length: 4 years
- Formation: 1927

The president of the Province of Savona is the head of the provincial government in Savona, Liguria, Italy. The president oversees the administration of the province, coordinates the activities of the municipalities, and represents the province in regional and national matters.

Since November 2026, the office has been held by Mauro Demichelis of the centre-right coalition.

== History ==
The Province of Savona was established in 1927 by the Fascist government. Local autonomy had been abolished and provincial administrations were placed under central control, with appointed officials replacing elected presidents.

After the establishment of the Italian Republic, the office was restored and the president was again elected by the Provincial Council starting from 1951. In 1993, a reform introduced the direct election of the president by popular vote. Following the 2014 Delrio reform, presidents are elected by the Assembly of the mayors and municipal councillors of the province's municipalities, and the term of office was reduced from five to four years.

== List ==
=== Presidents of the Province (1951–present) ===
No.	Portrait	Name	Term		Party
No.	Portrait	Name	Start	End	Party
		?	?	?	?
		Guido Bonino	30 September 1985	22 December 1989	Italian Socialist Party
		Pierluigi Pesenti	22 December 1989	6 August 1990	Italian Democratic Socialist Party
		Mario Robutti	6 August 1990	8 May 1995	Italian Socialist Party
		Alessandro Garassini	29 May 1995	28 June 1999	Italian People's Party; The Daisy
		Alessandro Garassini	28 June 1999	14 June 2004	Italian People's Party; The Daisy
		Marco Bertolotto	14 June 2004	14 November 2008	The Daisy; Democratic Party
		Mario Spanu	14 November 2008	11 July 2009	Special commissioner
		Angelo Vaccarezza	11 July 2009	13 October 2014	The People of Freedom; Forza Italia
		Monica Giuliano	13 October 2014	12 November 2018	Democratic Party
		Pierangelo Olivieri	12 November 2018	9 January 2023	Independent (centre-right)
		Pierangelo Olivieri	9 January 2023	22 September 2026	Cambiamo! Forza Italia
		Demis Aghittino (acting)	22 September 2026	23 November 2026	Lega
		Mauro Demichelis	23 November 2026	Incumbent	Liguria Insieme

== Sources ==
- "Storia amministrativa dell'ente". Ministero dell'Interno.
