= Guido Bonino (politician, born 1940) =

Italian politician (born 1940)

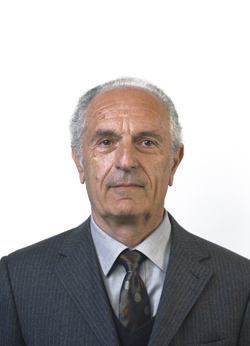

Member of the Chamber of Deputies
- In office 29 April 2008 – 14 March 2013
- Constituency: Liguria

Member of the Regional Council of Liguria
- In office 15 May 1995 – 17 February 2005

President of the Province of Savona
- In office 30 September 1985 – 22 December 1989
- Succeeded by: Pierluigi Pesenti

Personal details
- Born: 13 September 1940 (age 85) Camerana, Province of Cuneo, Kingdom of Italy
- Party: Italian Socialist Party (until 1990); Lega Nord (1994–2024)
- Occupation: Teacher

Guido Bonino (born 13 September 1940) is an Italian politician. Initially a member of the Italian Socialist Party, he later joined the Lega Nord and served as a member of the Chamber of Deputies from 2008 to 2013. He also served as a member of the Regional Council of Liguria and president of the Province of Savona. In October 2024, Bonino left the Lega, publicly announcing his resignation from the party.
