= Bardineto =

- Comune
- Comune di Bardineto
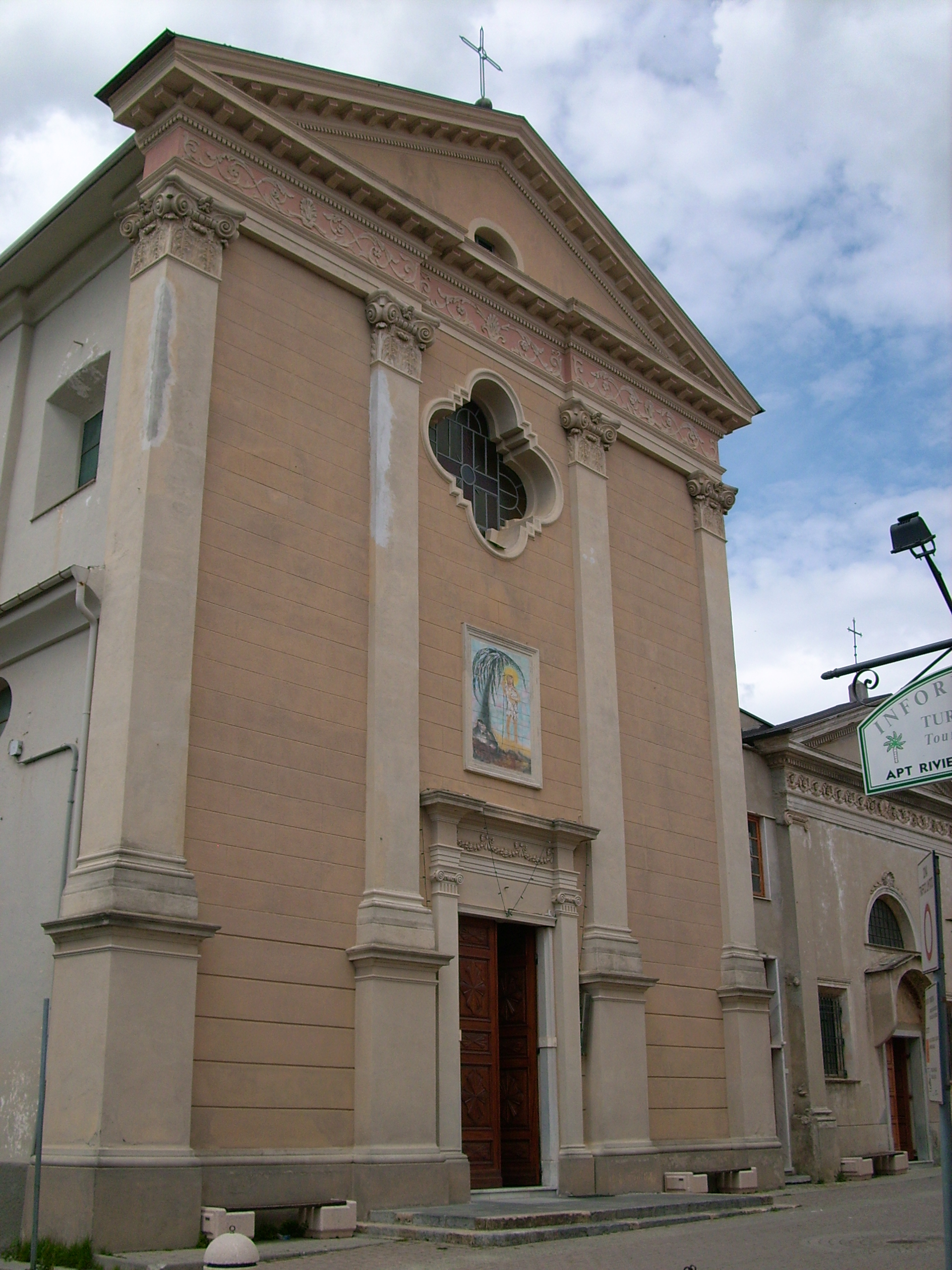
- Saint John the Baptist Church

- Coat of arms

- Location within Italy Location within Liguria
- Coordinates: 44°11′N 8°8′E
- Country: Italy
- Region: Liguria
- Province: Savona (SV)

Government
  - Mayor: Franca Mattiauda

Area
  - Total: 29.79 km^{2} (11.50 sq mi)
- Elevation: 711 m (2,333 ft)

Population (31 May 2022)
  - Total: 750
  - Density: 25/km^{2} (65/sq mi)
- Demonym: Bardinetesi
- Time zone: UTC+1 (CET)
  - Summer (DST): UTC+2 (CEST)
- Postal code: 17020
- Dialing code: 019
- ISTAT code: 009009
- Website: Official website

Bardineto (Ligurian: Berdënei) is a comune (municipality) in the Province of Savona in the Italian region Liguria, located about 70 kilometres (43 mi) southwest of Genoa and about 30 kilometres (19 mi) southwest of Savona.

Bardineto borders the following municipalities: Boissano, Calizzano, Castelvecchio di Rocca Barbena, Garessio, Giustenice, Loano, Magliolo, Pietra Ligure, and Toirano.

== See also ==
- Colle Scravaion
- Giogo di Toirano
- Rocca Barbena
