= Marco Bertolotto =

Italian doctor and politician

President of the Province of Savona
- In office 14 June 2004 – 14 November 2008
- Preceded by: Alessandro Garassini
- Succeeded by: Angelo Vaccarezza

Mayor of Toirano
- Incumbent
- Assumed office 8 june 2024
- Preceded by: Giuseppe De Fezza

Personal details
- Born: 8 September 1959 (age 66) Quiliano, Liguria, Italy
- Party: Italian Communist Party (until 1991); Democratic Party of the Left (1991-1998); Democrats of the Left (1998-2002); The Daisy (2002-2007); Democratic Party (2007-2008)
- Occupation: Physician

Marco Bertolotto (born 8 September 1959) is an Italian doctor and politician, former president of the Province of Savona and mayor of Toirano.

A graduate in medicine and surgery, Bertolotto pursued a number of specializations in medicine, surgery, and sanitary management prior to beginning his political career. He served as director of the pain therapy and palliative care unit at Santa Corona hospital in Pietra Ligure, before being elected to the first of two terms as mayor of Toirano in 1995. During his second term of office he generated a lively council debate over the construction of a waste incinerator on municipal land. He also engineered a twinning agreement, inaugurated in October 2003, with the Christian community of Rumbek in South Sudan.

Bertolotto was in 2004 elected President of Savona province in a runoff on 12 and 13 June. He represented the centre-left Ulivo coalition and attracted 50.6% of the vote. In 2007 he lost the support of two of the provincial councillors representing the Italian Democratic Socialists, and in June 2008 he announced that, on failing to be selected as Democratic Party candidate for the provincial elections due in 2009, he was resigning his party membership.

On 14 November 2008, following the resignation of key councillors from the governing coalition, the Savona provincial administration was formally dissolved and Bertolotto left his post. He was succeeded by the provincial commissioner Mario Spanu, who held office until an extraordinary election in 2009 installed Angelo Vaccarezza to the provincial presidency.

Political offices
Preceded by Alessandro Garassini	President of the Province of Savona; 2004-2008	Succeeded by Angelo Vaccarezza
