= Pierangelo Olivieri =

Italian politician (born 1973)

President of the Province of Savona
- In office 12 November 2018 – 22 September 2026
- Preceded by: Monica Giuliano
- Succeeded by: Mauro Demichelis

Mayor of Calizzano
- Incumbent
- Assumed office 7 May 2012
- Preceded by: Enrico Mozzoni

Personal details
- Born: 2 September 1973 (age 53) Savona, Liguria, Italy
- Party: Cambiamo! Forza Italia
- Occupation: Lawyer

Pierangelo Olivieri (born 2 September 1973) is an Italian politician who served as president of the Province of Savona from 2018 to 2026. He has served as mayor of Calizzano since 2012.

In 2018, Olivieri was elected president of the Province of Savona as the candidate of a broad centre-right and civic coalition. In January 2023, Olivieri was re-elected president as the Cambiamo! candidate backed by the faction of Giovanni Toti, defeating Giancarlo Canepa, the Lega candidate supported by Brothers of Italy and Forza Italia. In February 2024, Olivieri joined Forza Italia, with his entry into the party announced by national secretary Antonio Tajani.

Following his appointment as president of the VIO hub of Vado Ligure in July 2026, Olivieri resigned from provincial president on 22 September.
