= Ceriale =

- Comune
- Comune di Ceriale
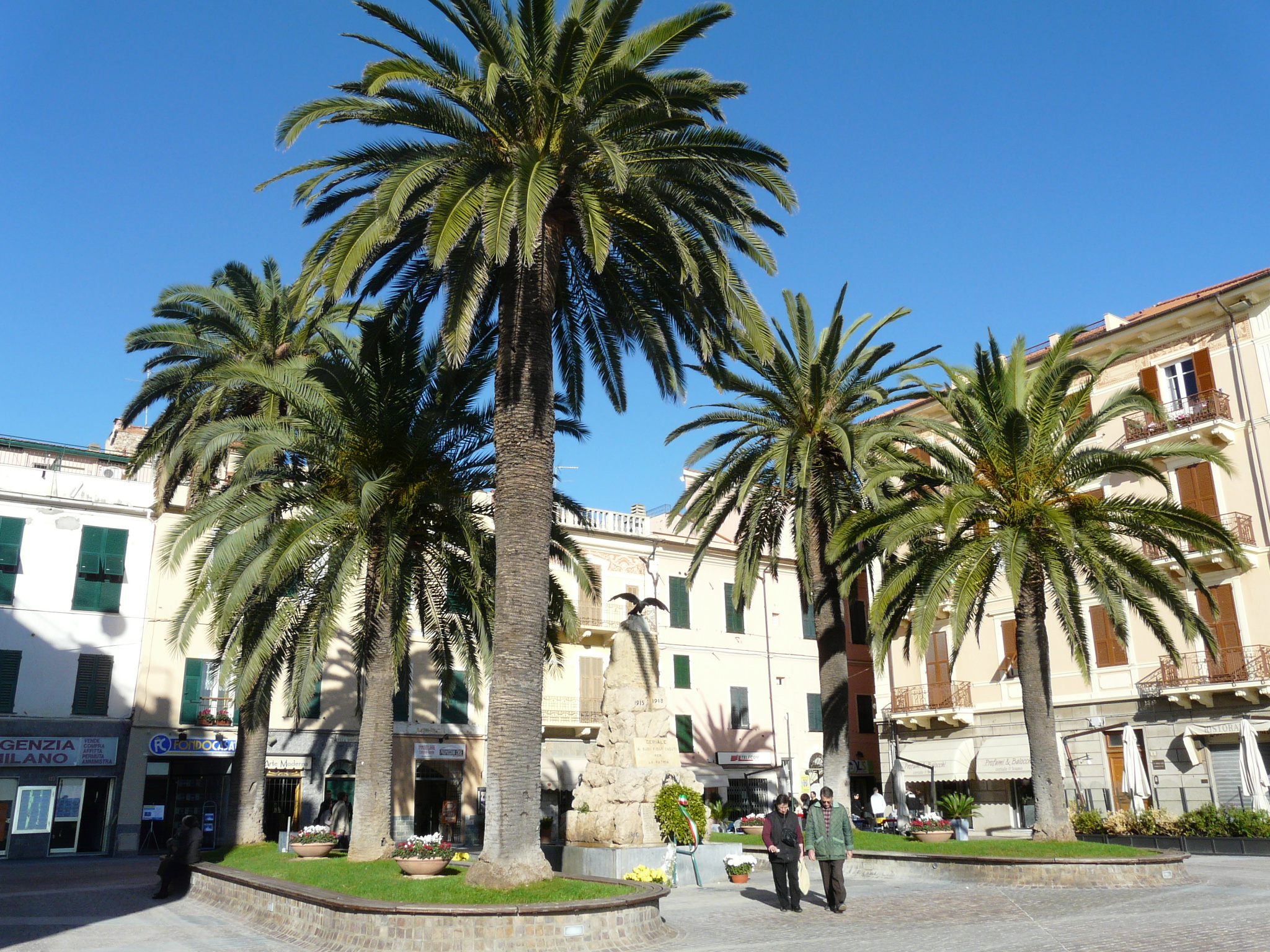
- Piazza della Vittoria

- Flag Coat of arms

- Location within Italy Location within Liguria
- Coordinates: 44°5′N 8°14′E
- Country: Italy
- Region: Liguria
- Province: Savona (SV)
- Frazioni: Peagna

Government
  - Mayor: Marinella Fasano

Area
  - Total: 11.2 km^{2} (4.3 sq mi)
- Elevation: 10 m (33 ft)

Population (30 June 2017)
  - Total: 5,028
  - Density: 449/km^{2} (1,160/sq mi)
- Demonym: Cerialesi
- Time zone: UTC+1 (CET)
  - Summer (DST): UTC+2 (CEST)
- Postal code: 17023
- Dialing code: 0182
- Website: Official website

Ceriale (Ligurian: O Çejâ, locally Seio) is a comune (municipality) in the Province of Savona in the Italian region of Liguria, located about 70 kilometres (43 mi) southwest of Genoa and about 30 kilometres (19 mi) southwest of Savona.

Ceriale borders the following municipalities: Albenga, Balestrino, Borghetto Santo Spirito, Cisano sul Neva, and Toirano.

== Geography ==
Position of Ceriale in the Province of Savona

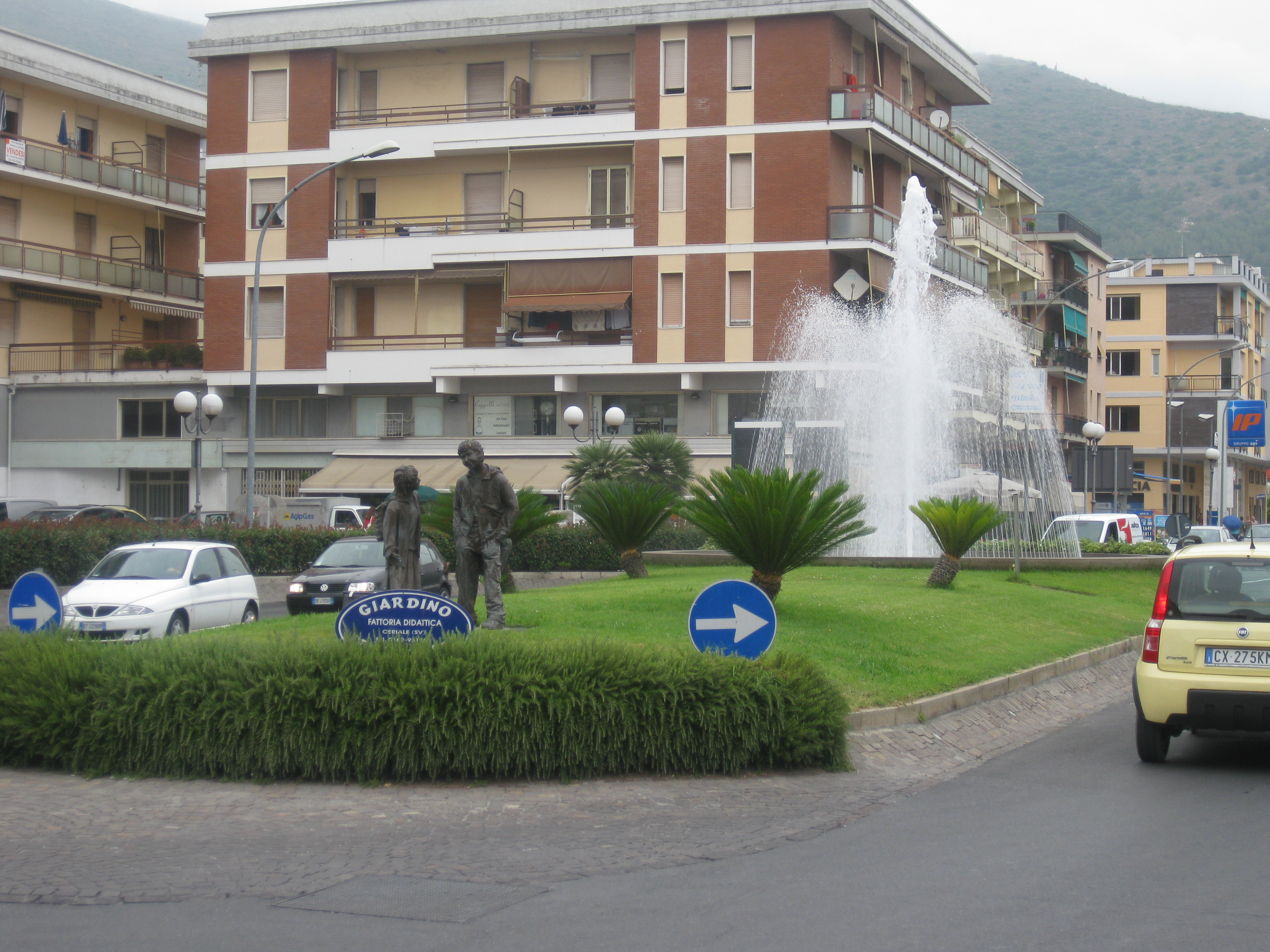
The Via Aurelia

The town is located in the Riviera di Ponente, east of the plain of Albenga, on the slopes of Mount Croce, at an elevation of 541 metres (1,775 ft).

== History ==
The village, an territorial dominion of the bishop of Albenga since the early Middle Ages, was acquired in the 14th century by the Republic of Genoa. In that period the nearby village of Capriolo was abandoned, according to local sources, as a result of an invasion of ants. Following the frequent raids by Saracens on the Ligurian coast, a circular bastion was built adjacent to the beach in 1563; however, the town was again attacked and sacked by Barbary pirates in 1637.

Along with other towns of the Ligurian Riviera, in 1764 Ceriale participated in an uprising against the Republic of Genoa, caused by the heavy tax burden. It became part of the Kingdom of Sardinia in 1815, after the fall of Napoleon Bonaparte; and, in 1861, of the Kingdom of Italy. From 1973 until 31 December 2008 Ceriale was part of Ingauna Mountain Community, which was terminated by the Liguria Regional Law Number 23, 29 December 2010.

== Main sights ==
=== Religious architecture ===
- Parish Church of Saints John the Baptist and Eugene. It houses a 16th century crucifix and also numerous blades dating from the 16th and 17th centuries.
- Church of Peagna. Adjacent to the cemetery, it is flanked by a tower built in Baroque style and internally is home to paintings from the 15th and 16th centuries.

=== Amusement parks ===
- Water Park: The Caravelle

== Culture ==
=== Museums ===
- The Paleontological Museum Silvio Lai: It was founded in 1993 in the hamlet of Peagna. The museum exhibits the collection of municipal fossil from the nearby Regional Natural Reserve of Rio Torsero, dating back to Pliocene lower (5.3000000 to 3.6000000 of years ago). The museum has a conference room, a laboratory and a small library.

=== Events ===
- Feast of San Rocco (16 August)

== Twin towns and sister cities ==
Ceriale is twinned with:

- Sucha Beskidzka, Poland

== Economy ==
The town's main economic resources are tourism and agriculture. Vegetables and flowers are cultivated, in particular orchids grown in greenhouses. Industries include shipyards and confectionery plants.
