= Toirano =

- Comune
- Comune di Toirano
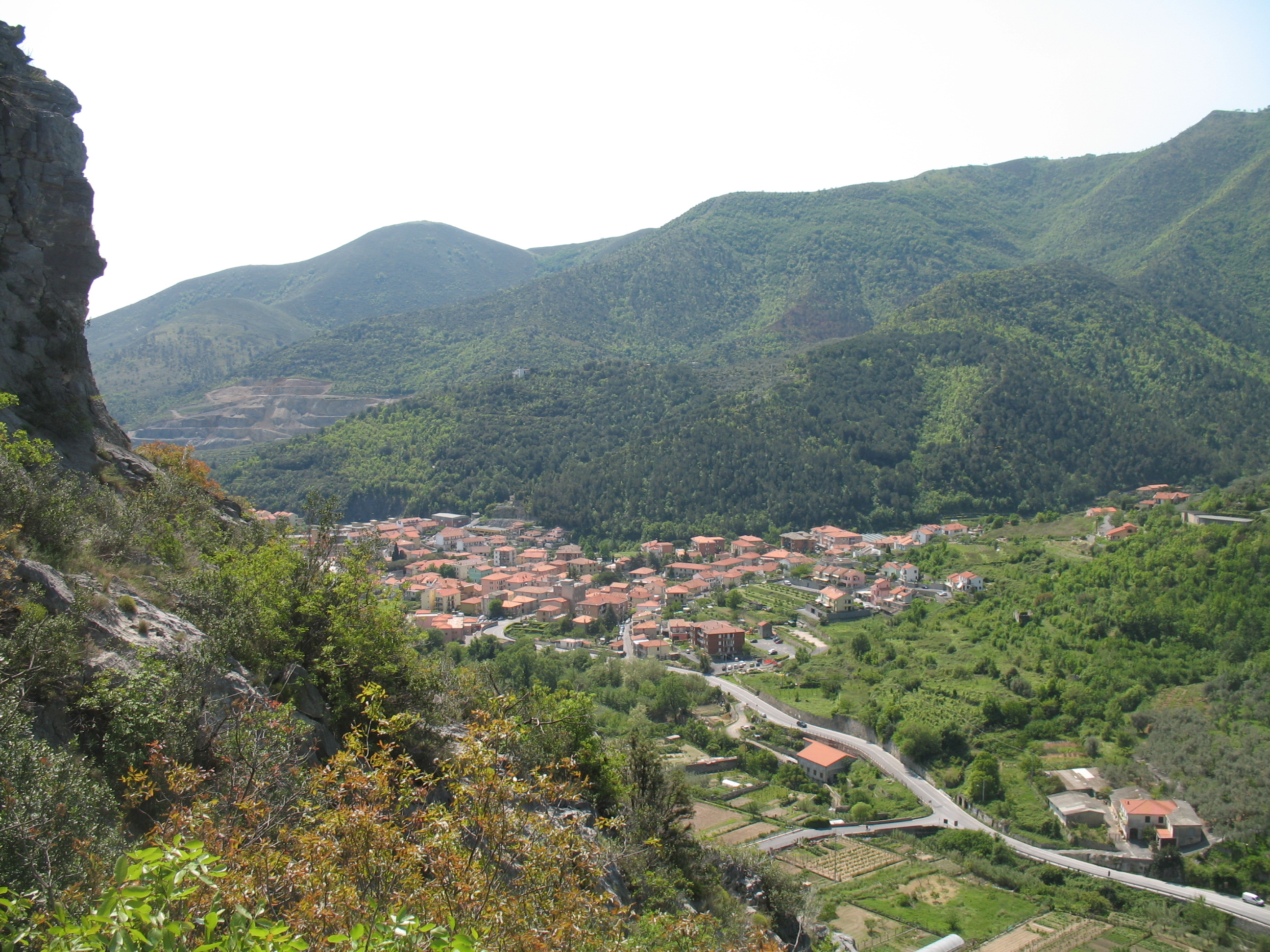
- Toirano

- Flag Coat of arms

- Location within Italy Location within Liguria
- Coordinates: 44°7′N 8°13′E
- Country: Italy
- Region: Liguria
- Province: Savona (SV)

Government
  - Mayor: Marco Bertolotto

Area
  - Total: 18.97 km^{2} (7.32 sq mi)
- Elevation: 38 m (125 ft)

Population (31 December 2015)
  - Total: 2,644
  - Density: 139.4/km^{2} (361.0/sq mi)
- Demonym: Toiranesi
- Time zone: UTC+1 (CET)
  - Summer (DST): UTC+2 (CEST)
- Postal code: 17055
- Dialing code: 0182
- Patron saint: Martin of Tours
- Saint day: 11 November
- Website: Official website

Toirano (Ligurian: Tuiran) is a comune (municipality) in the Province of Savona in the Italian region Liguria, located about 70 kilometres (43 mi) southwest of Genoa and about 30 kilometres (19 mi) southwest of Savona.

== Geography ==
Toirano borders the following municipalities: Balestrino, Bardineto, Boissano, Borghetto Santo Spirito, Castelvecchio di Rocca Barbena, and Ceriale. The town centre is located on the Varatella banks.

== Main sights ==
- Toirano Caves
- Giogo di Toirano
