= Ugo Magnetto =

Italian footballer

Personal information
- Date of birth: 26 November 1902
- Place of birth: Borghetto Santo Spirito, Kingdom of Italy
- Date of death: 25 August 1984 (aged 81)
- Place of death: Borghetto Santo Spirito, Italy
- Position: Midfielder

Senior career*
Years	Team	Apps	(Gls)
1919–1930	Imperia		
1930–1931	Football Club Internazionale	1	(0)
1931–1934	Imperia		
1934–1935	Albingaunia		
1935–1937	Imperia		
1938–1940	Albingaunia		
- * Club domestic league appearances and goals

Ugo Magnetto (26 November 1902 – 25 August 1984) was an Italian professional football player. Magnetto made one appearance for Football Club Internazionale during the 1930/31 season.
