= Zuccarello =

Zuccarello Sucarê (Ligurian)
- Comune
- Comune di Zuccarello
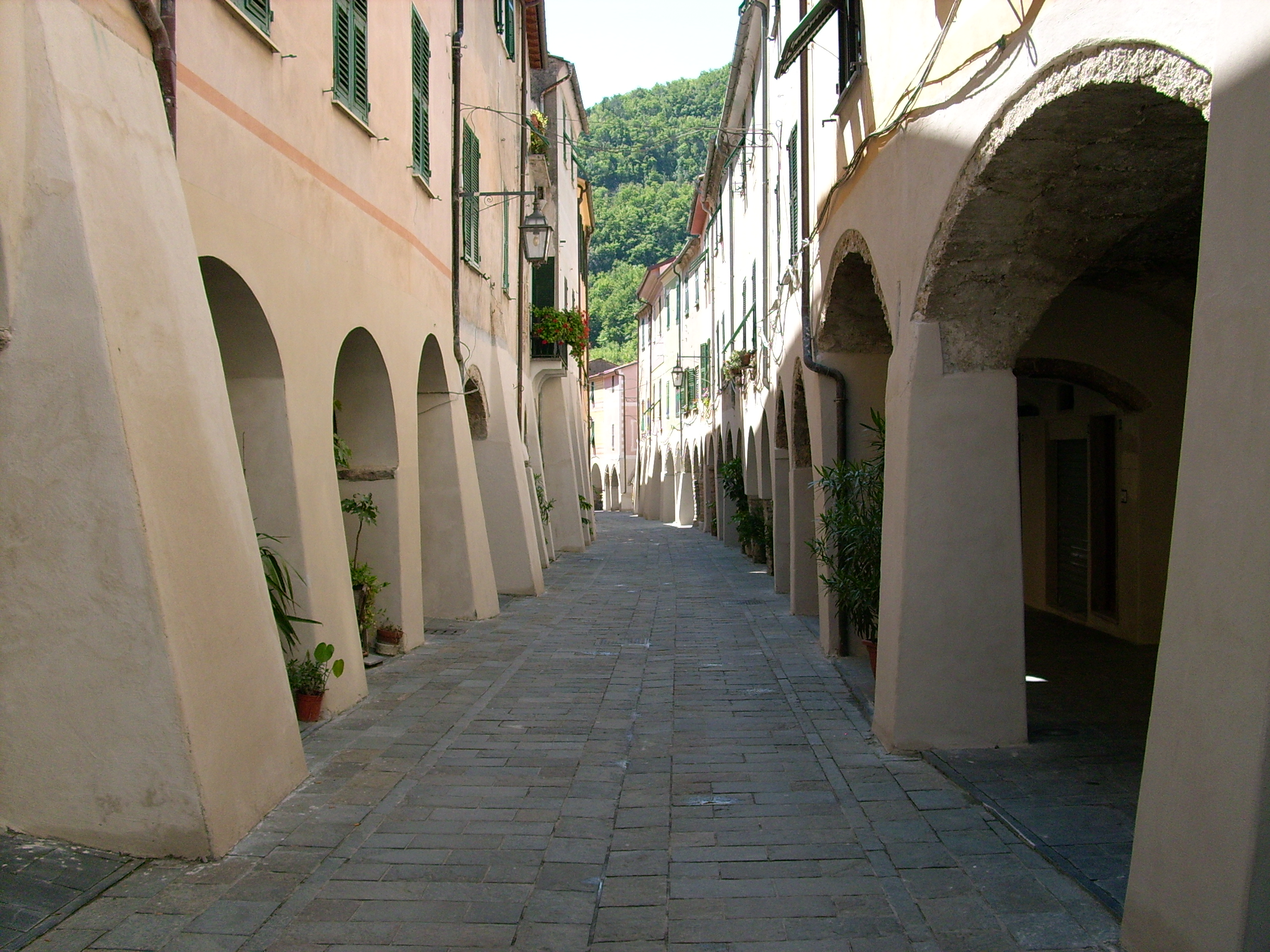
- The old town

- Flag Coat of arms

- Location within Italy Location within Liguria
- Coordinates: 44°7′N 8°7′E
- Country: Italy
- Region: Liguria
- Province: Savona (SV)

Government
  - Mayor: Claudio Paliotto

Area
  - Total: 10.81 km^{2} (4.17 sq mi)
- Elevation: 130 m (430 ft)

Population (31 May 2022)
  - Total: 277
  - Density: 25.6/km^{2} (66.4/sq mi)
- Demonym: Zuccarellesi
- Time zone: UTC+1 (CET)
  - Summer (DST): UTC+2 (CEST)
- Postal code: 17039
- Dialing code: 0182
- Website: Official website

Zuccarello (Italian pronunciation: [dzukkaˈrɛllo; tsuk-]; Ligurian: Sucarê [sykaˈɾeː]) is a comune (municipality) in the Province of Savona in the Italian region Liguria, located about 70 kilometres (43 mi) southwest of Genoa and about 35 kilometres (22 mi) southwest of Savona.

Zuccarello borders the following municipalities: Arnasco, Balestrino, Castelbianco, Castelvecchio di Rocca Barbena, Cisano sul Neva, and Erli. Sights include the church of San Bartolomeo, built in the 13th century, the Marquisses' Palace, the remains of a castle, and the chapel of Sant'Antonio Abate, with late medieval frescoes. It is one of I Borghi più belli d'Italia ("The most beautiful villages of Italy").
