= Balestrino =

- Comune
- Comune di Balestrino
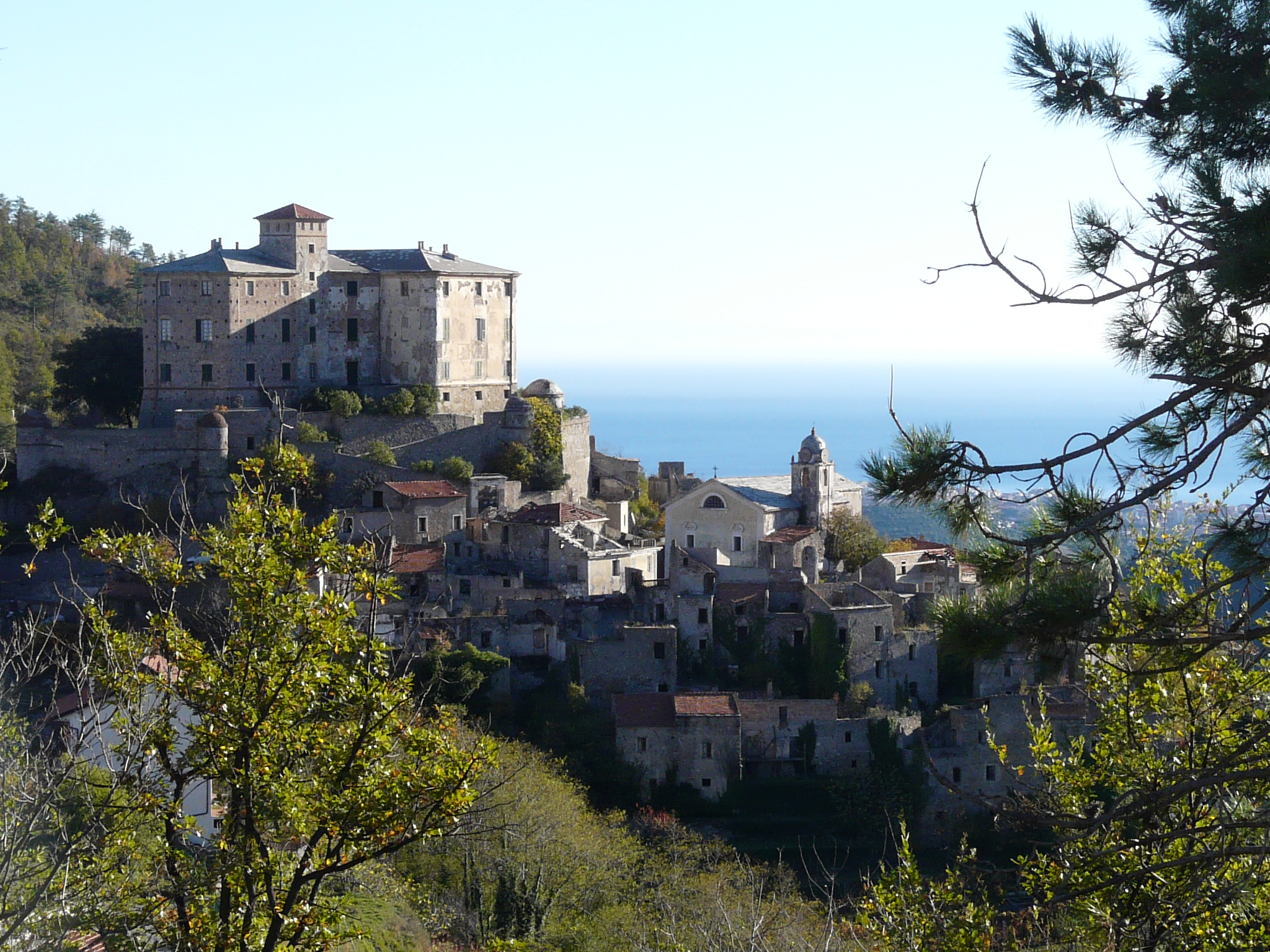
- View of the old town

- Coat of arms

- Balestrino within the Province of Savona

- Location within Italy Location within Liguria
- Coordinates: 44°7′29.48″N 8°10′28.1″E
- Country: Italy
- Region: Liguria
- Province: Savona (SV)
- Frazioni: Bergalla, Borgo, Cuneo, Poggio

Area
  - Total: 11.3 km^{2} (4.4 sq mi)

Population (31 December 2011)
  - Total: 607
  - Density: 53.7/km^{2} (139/sq mi)
- Demonym: Balestrinesi
- Time zone: UTC+1 (CET)
  - Summer (DST): UTC+2 (CEST)
- Postal code: 17020
- Dialing code: 0182
- Website: Official website

Balestrino (Ligurian: Barestin or Balestrin) is a comune (municipality) in the Province of Savona in the Italian region Liguria, located about 70 kilometres (43 mi) southwest of Genoa and about 30 kilometres (19 mi) southwest of Savona. As of 31 December 2011, it had a population of 607 and an area of 11.3 square kilometres (4.4 mi^{2}).

== History ==
Balestrino is composed by the old historic town, upon a hill, and the new town below it. Abandoned in 1953 for hydrogeological instability, the old centre is a ghost town whereas the modern center is still inhabited today.

== Geography ==
Balestrino borders the following municipalities: Castelvecchio di Rocca Barbena, Ceriale, Cisano sul Neva, Toirano, and Zuccarello. It counts the hamlets (frazioni) of Bergalla, Borgo, Cuneo, and Poggio.

== Demographics ==
Historical population

Year	Pop.	±%
1861	821	—
1871	855	+4.1%
1881	766	−10.4%
1901	632	−17.5%
1911	612	−3.2%

Year	Pop.	±%
1921	549	−10.3%
1931	527	−4.0%
1936	486	−7.8%
1951	467	−3.9%
1961	429	−8.1%

Year	Pop.	±%
1971	419	−2.3%
1981	489	+16.7%
1991	529	+8.2%
2001	535	+1.1%
2011	607	+13.5%

Source: Data from ISTAT

== Gallery ==
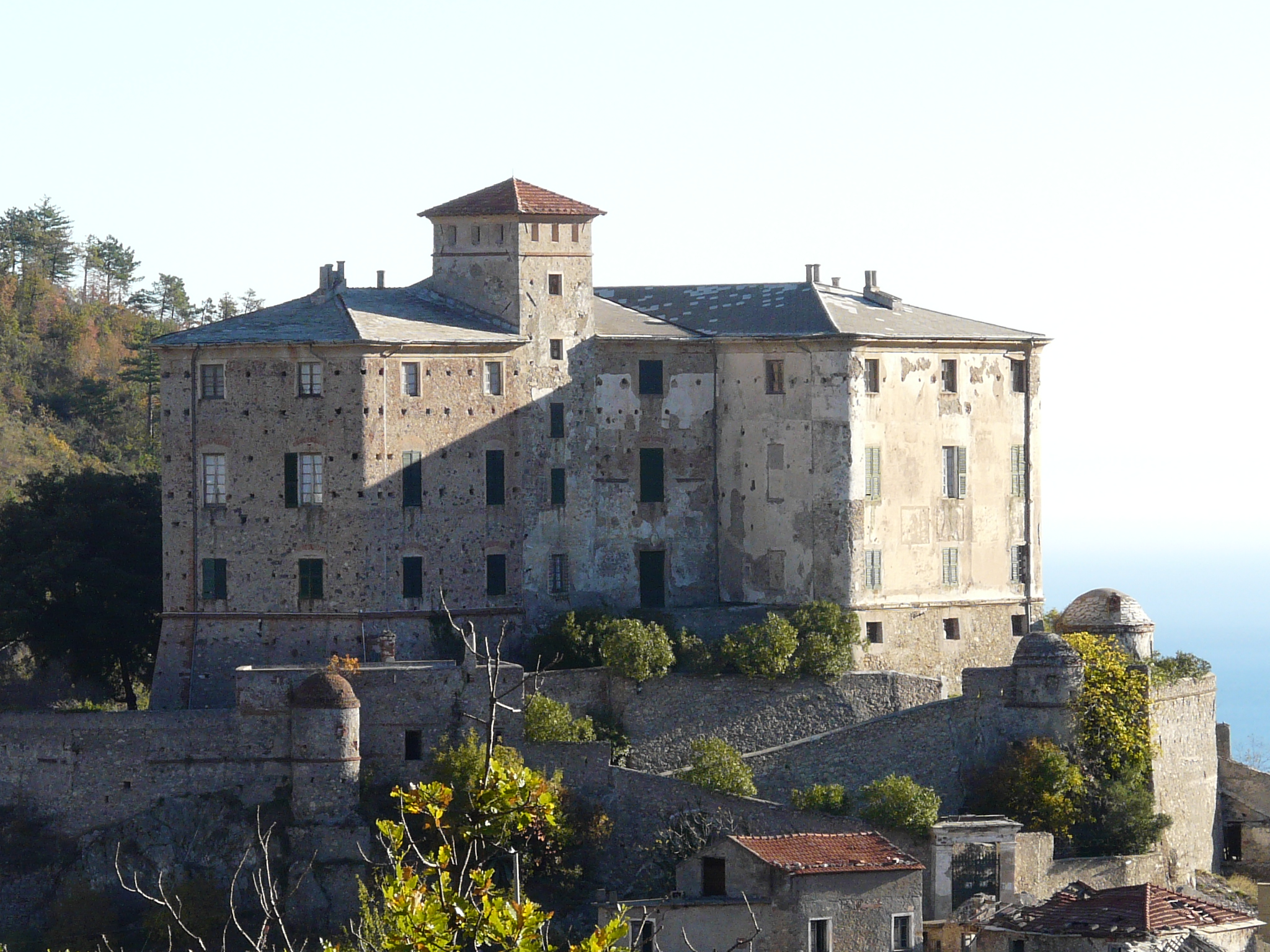
The castle

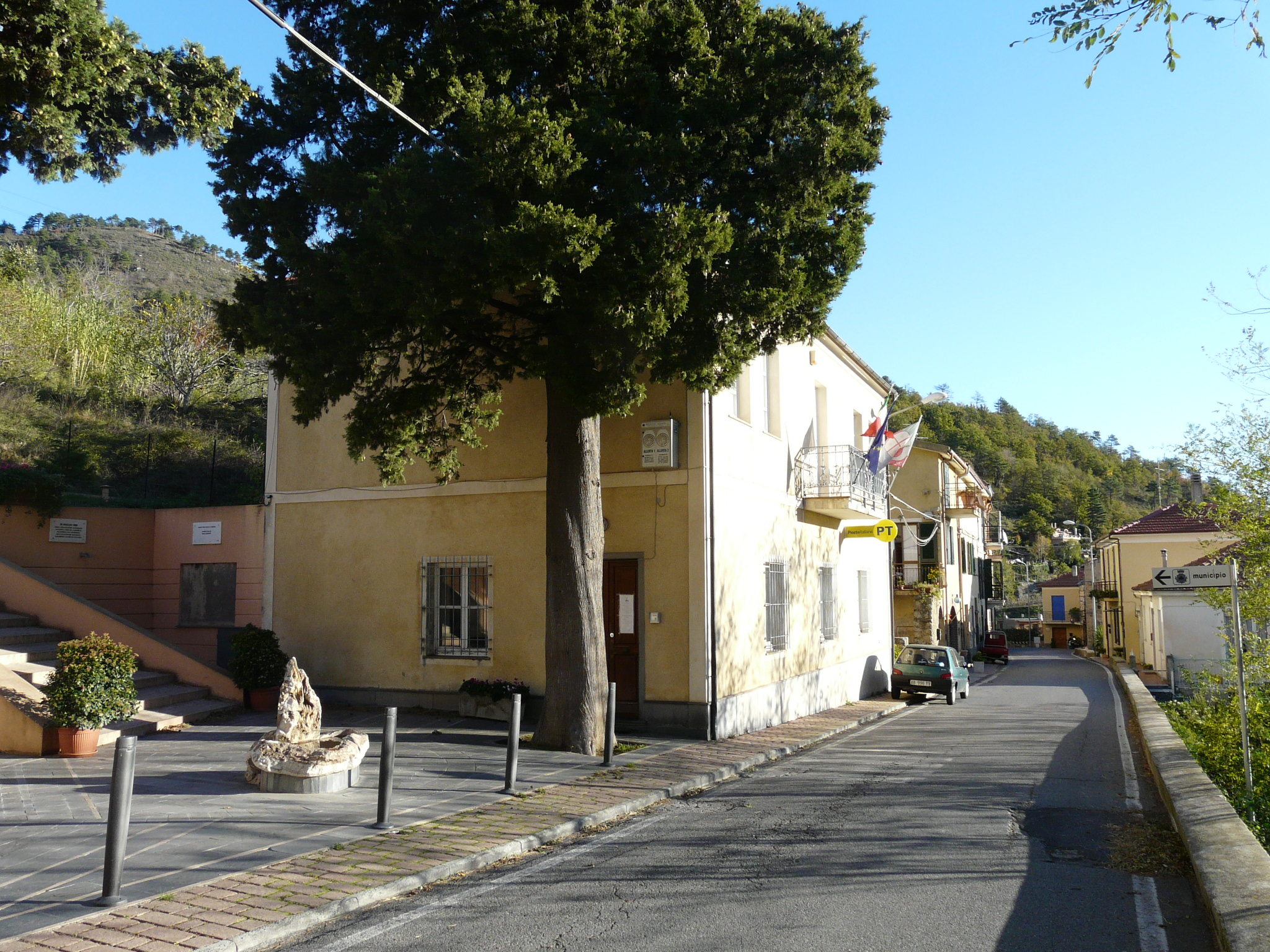
The new town hall

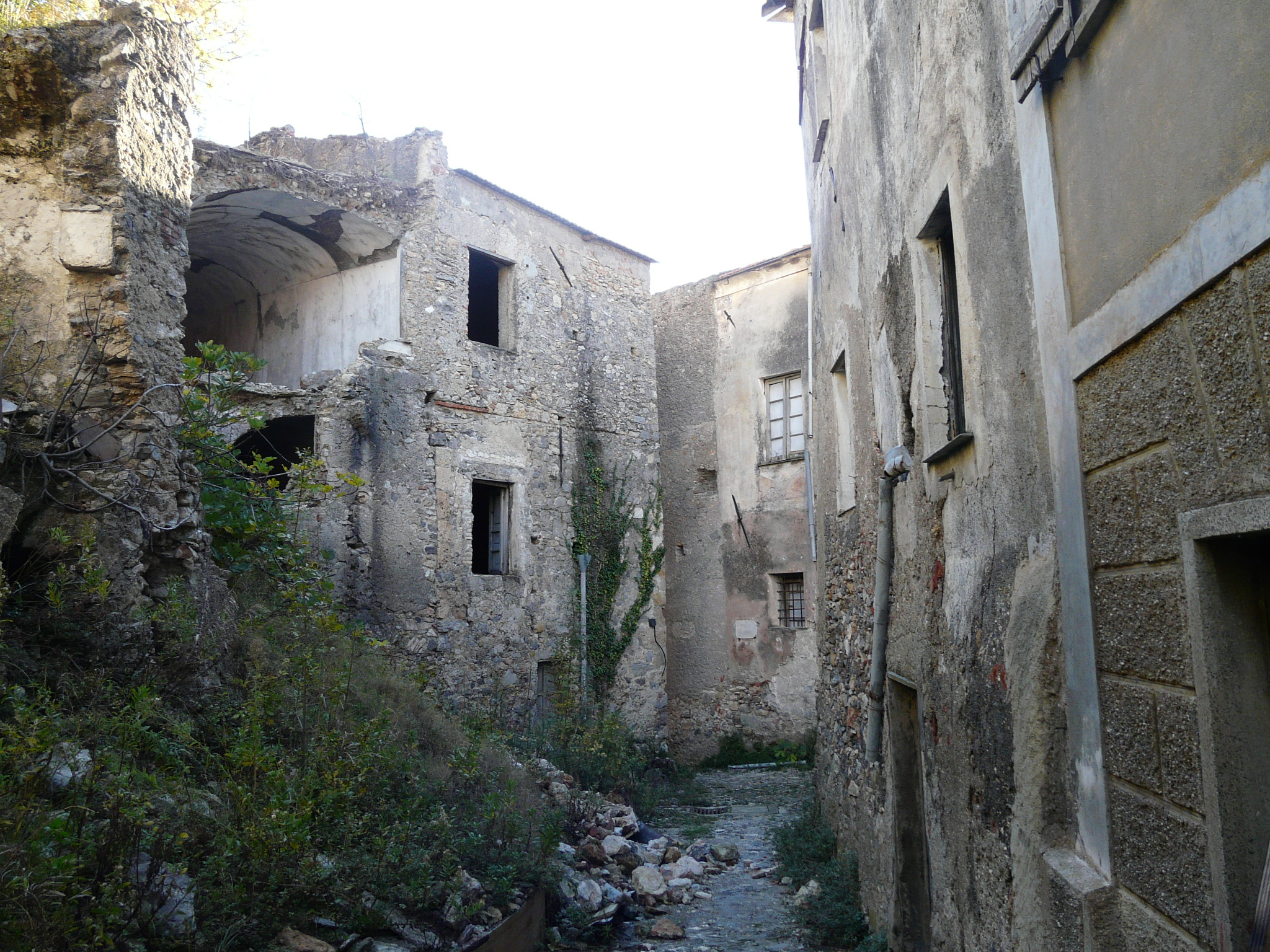
A road in the abandoned old town

== Other ==
- There are small medieval and renaissance crossbows known as balestrino crossbows (aka assassins crossbows).
