= Borghetto Santo Spirito =

- Comune
- Comune di Borghetto Santo Spirito
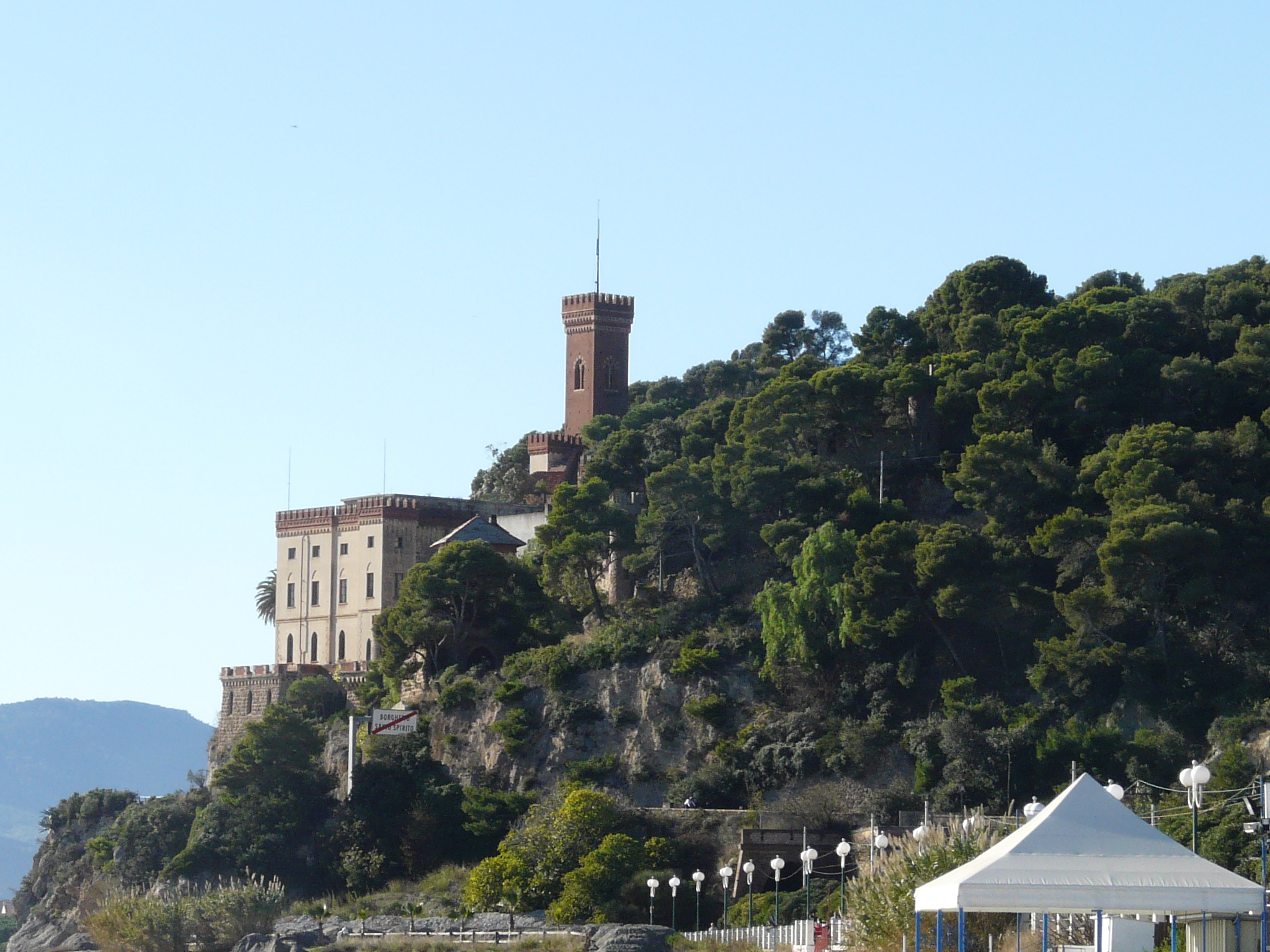
- Borelli Castle

- Flag Coat of arms

- Location within Italy Location within Liguria
- Coordinates: 44°6′N 8°14′E
- Country: Italy
- Region: Liguria
- Province: Savona (SV)

Government
  - Mayor: Giancarlo Canepa

Area
  - Total: 5.39 km^{2} (2.08 sq mi)
- Elevation: 2 m (6.6 ft)

Population (30 April 2017)
  - Total: 4,836
  - Density: 897/km^{2} (2,320/sq mi)
- Demonym: Borghettini
- Time zone: UTC+1 (CET)
  - Summer (DST): UTC+2 (CEST)
- Postal code: 17020
- Dialing code: 0182
- Website: Official website

Borghetto Santo Spirito is a comune (municipality) in the Province of Savona in the Italian region Liguria, located about 70 kilometres (43 mi) southwest of Genoa and about 30 kilometres (19 mi) southwest of Savona.

Borghetto Santo Spirito borders the following municipalities: Boissano, Ceriale, Loano, and Toirano.

The town is noted in the general context of the Riviera as one of the examples of urban explosion, with tall apartment buildings built in the 1960s and 1970s mainly near the shore. Borghetto Santo Spirito means "Little Town of the Holy Spirit" and is crossed by the stream Varatella. Worthy of note are the Borelli Castle above the Monte Piccaro overlooking the Ligurian Sea, the Sanctuary of Saint Anthony of Padua with a relic of the saint, the Church of Saint Matthew the Apostle, and the small Pineland Hill in the inland of the Comune with luxurious housing units. Like all the coastal comuni of the province of Savona it is crossed every year by the Milan - San Remo cycling race.

== Notable people from Borghetto Santo Spirito ==
- Ugo Magnetto, football player
