= 1887 Liguria earthquake =

Earthquake affecting Italy and France

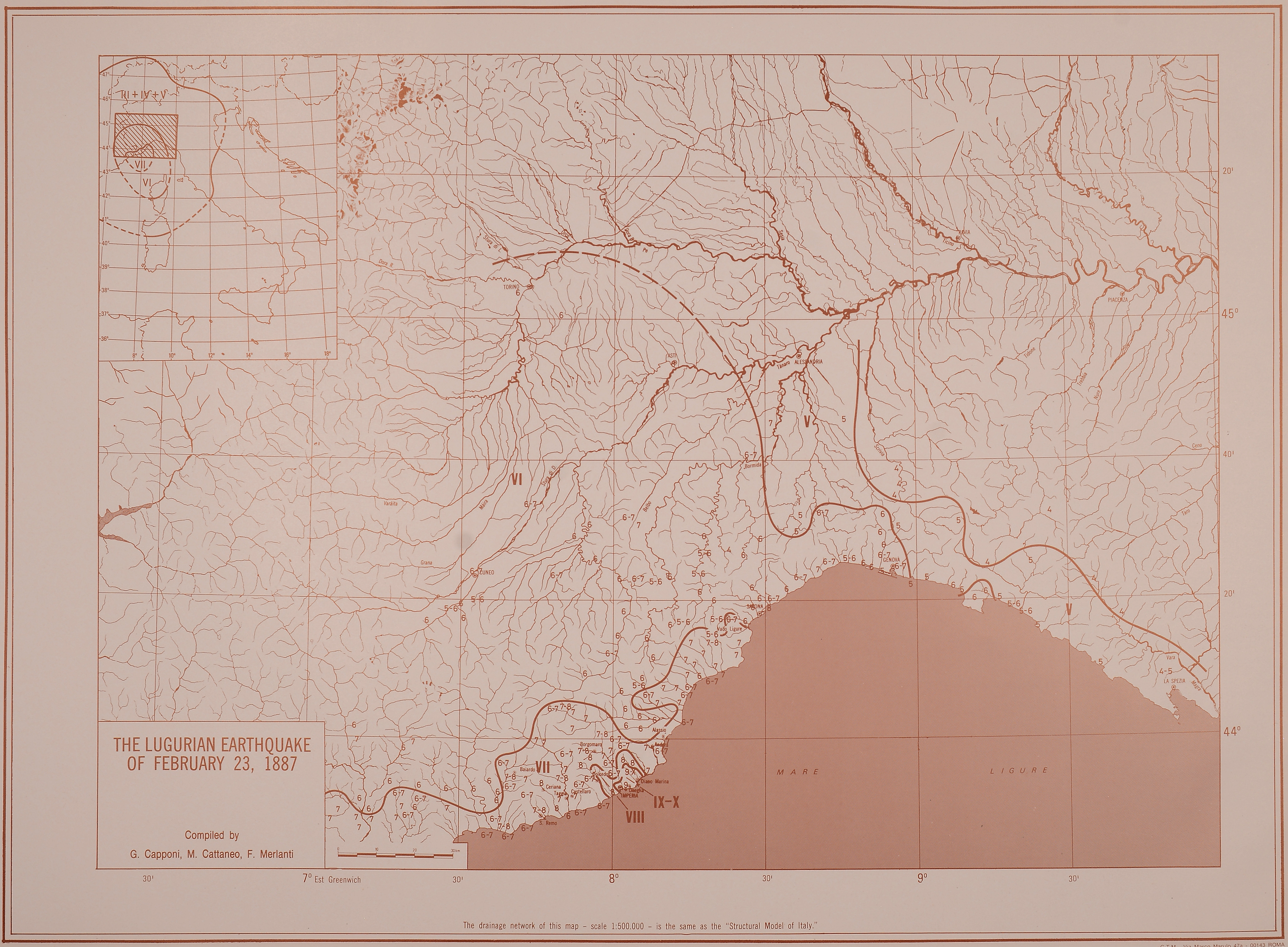
- An isoseismal map of the tremor prepared by CNR

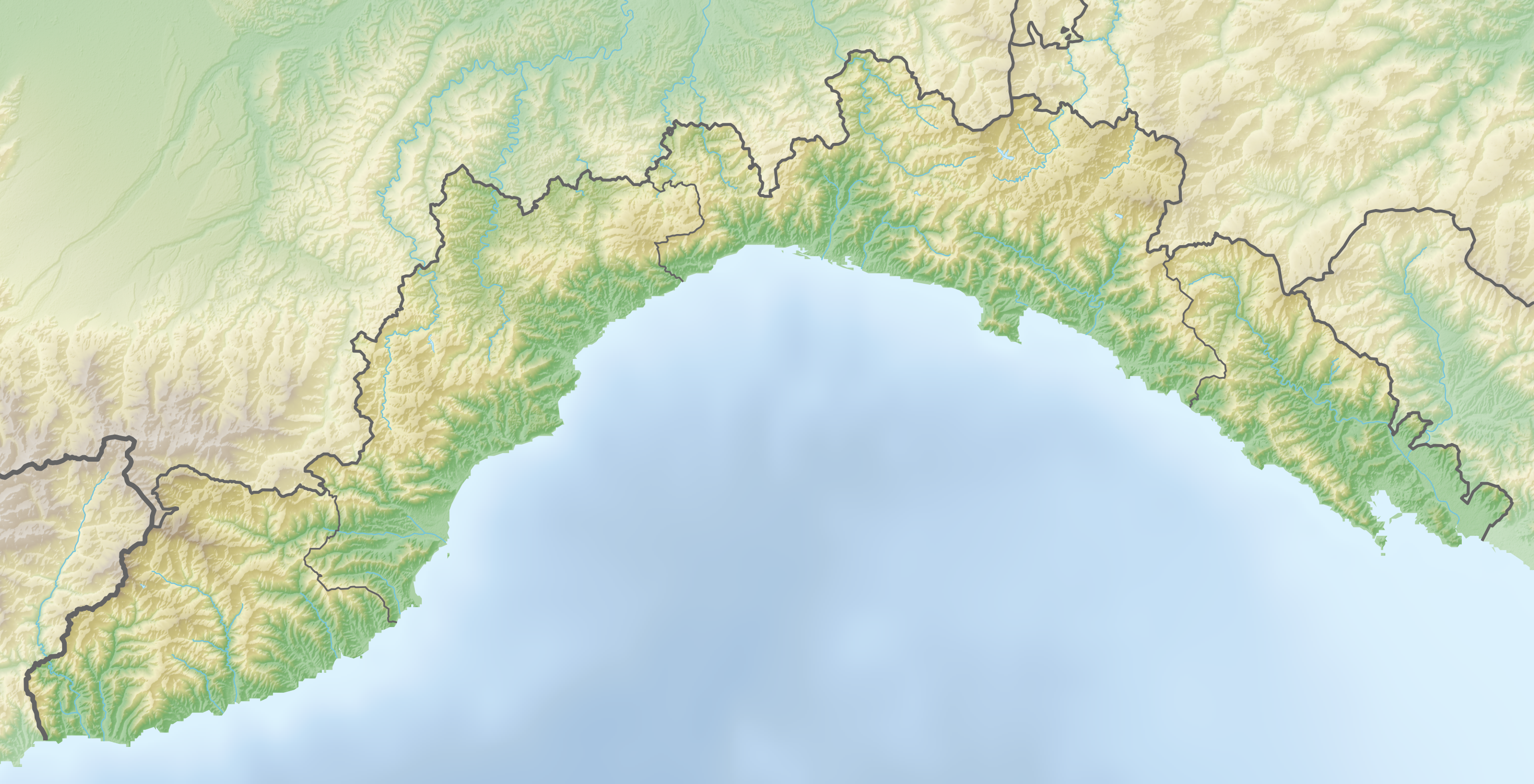
- Location within Liguria Location within Italy
- Local date: 23 February 1887
- Local time: 06:30
- Magnitude: 6.8–6.9 M_{w}
- Epicenter: 43°52′48″N 8°1′48″E
- Fault: Ligurian Fault System
- Type: Thrust
- Areas affected: Italy, France
- Max. intensity: MMI IX (Violent)–MMI X (Extreme)
- Tsunami: 2 meters in Imperia Another tsunami was generated by a landslide near the French Riviera.
- Landslides: Yes
- Casualties: ~600–3,000 fatalities

The 1887 Liguria earthquake struck off the coast of Imperia, Italy on the early morning of 23 February 1887, with an estimated moment magnitude of 6.8–6.9, killing about 600–3,000 people. It also generated a tsunami that had a run-up height of two meters. The widespread damage was said to be so severe that the town of Bussana Vecchia was abandoned by its former inhabitants.

== Earthquake ==
The tremor had a magnitude of between 6.3 and 7.5 M_{w} along with an intensity of X (Extreme) on the Mercalli scale. The most likely source of this earthquake was along a reverse fault, striking N55°E. The simulated fault models best explains the tsunami characteristics observed. Two different fault parameters were presented; a steep, south-dipping fault rupturing in a M_{w} 6.8 event, or a shallower, north-dipping fault that ruptures in a M_{w} 6.9 event. It was also hypothesized that the tremor was due to the rupture of the 80 km long Northern Ligurian fault system that ran along the coast of the Ligurian Basin.

The Italian Peninsula observes frequent seismic activity due to its location near numerous faults between the convergence of the Adriatic Plate and the Eurasian plate. However the area where the epicenter of the tremor was located does not experience much frequent activity due to being far from major faults that can cause these events.

== Impact ==
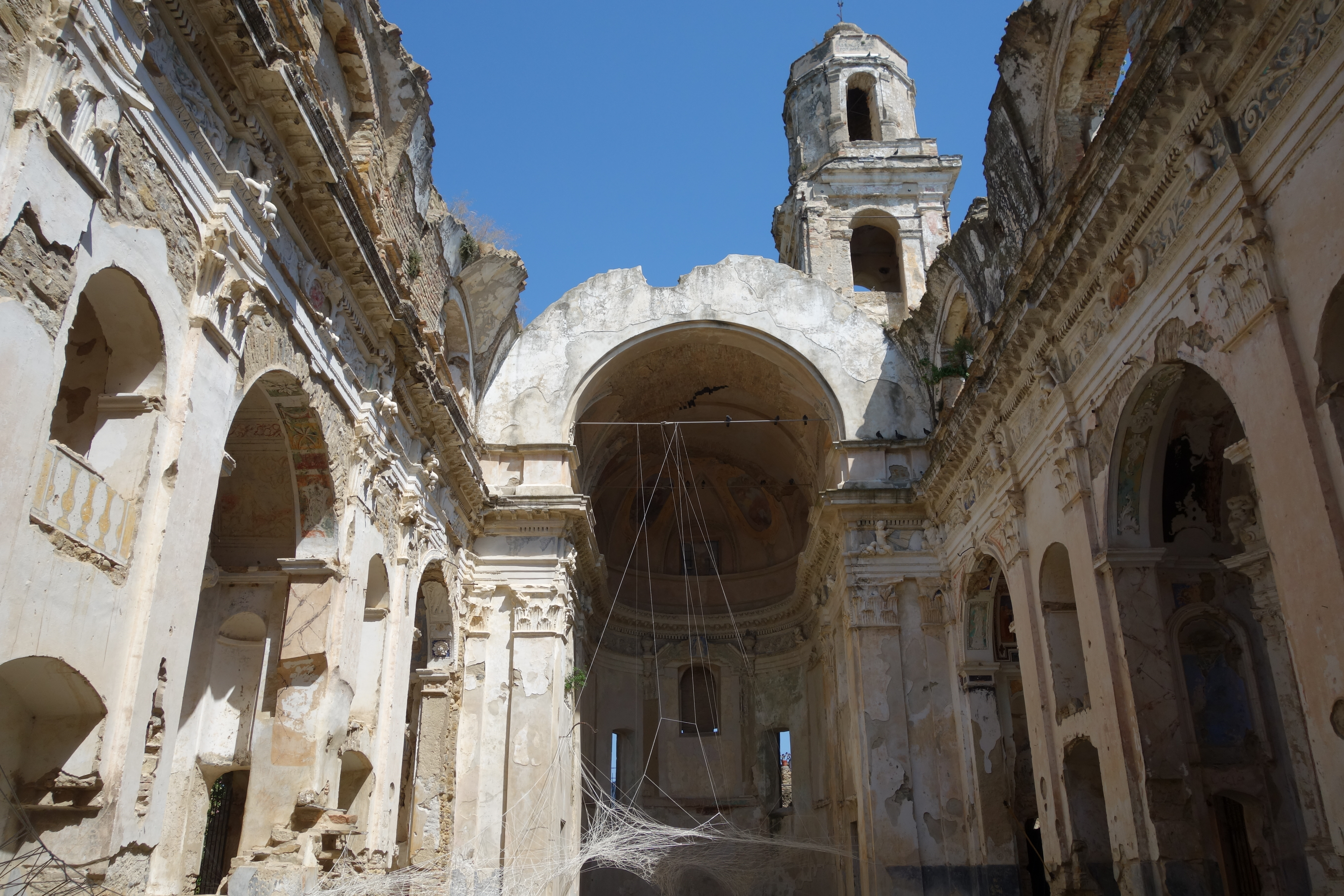
A destroyed church in Bussana Vecchia

The tremor caused widespread damage along the coast of Northwest Italy, particularly in the towns of Imperia and Diano Marina and small towns on the southeastern coast of France. About 600–3,000 people were presumed dead. Most notably the town of Bussana Vecchia, Sanremo was completely abandoned and beyond repair for more than six decades. In the 1960s, a group of artists from around the world tried to revive the area and were successful. To this day, a small population of artists and a few families live in the area as well as cafes and paintings for display. The dome of the Duomo of San Giovanni Battista, located in Loano, collapsed, due to the earthquake.

Limited damage was observed along the French Riviera, but another tsunami generated by a landslide increased the death toll in the town of Menton. The Prince of Wales, who was visiting the town of Cannes at the time, was urged by the Royal Family to return, but faced difficulty evacuating due to the thousands of others fleeing the area by train. Some civilians were reported to be leaving still wearing their pajamas due to the early occurrence of the event.

== See also ==
- List of historical earthquakes
- List of earthquakes in Italy
- List of earthquakes in France
