= Oratorio of San Giovanni Battista, Loano =

Roman Catholic Chapel in Loano, Italy

Coordinates: 44.1283°N 8.2616°E

The Oratorio of San Giovanni Battista is a Roman Catholic chapel, located on Via Boragine, Loano, Liguria, Italy. Since 1262, it has housed the Confraternity of the White Disciples of San Giovanni Battista and is one of the oldest buildings in Loano.

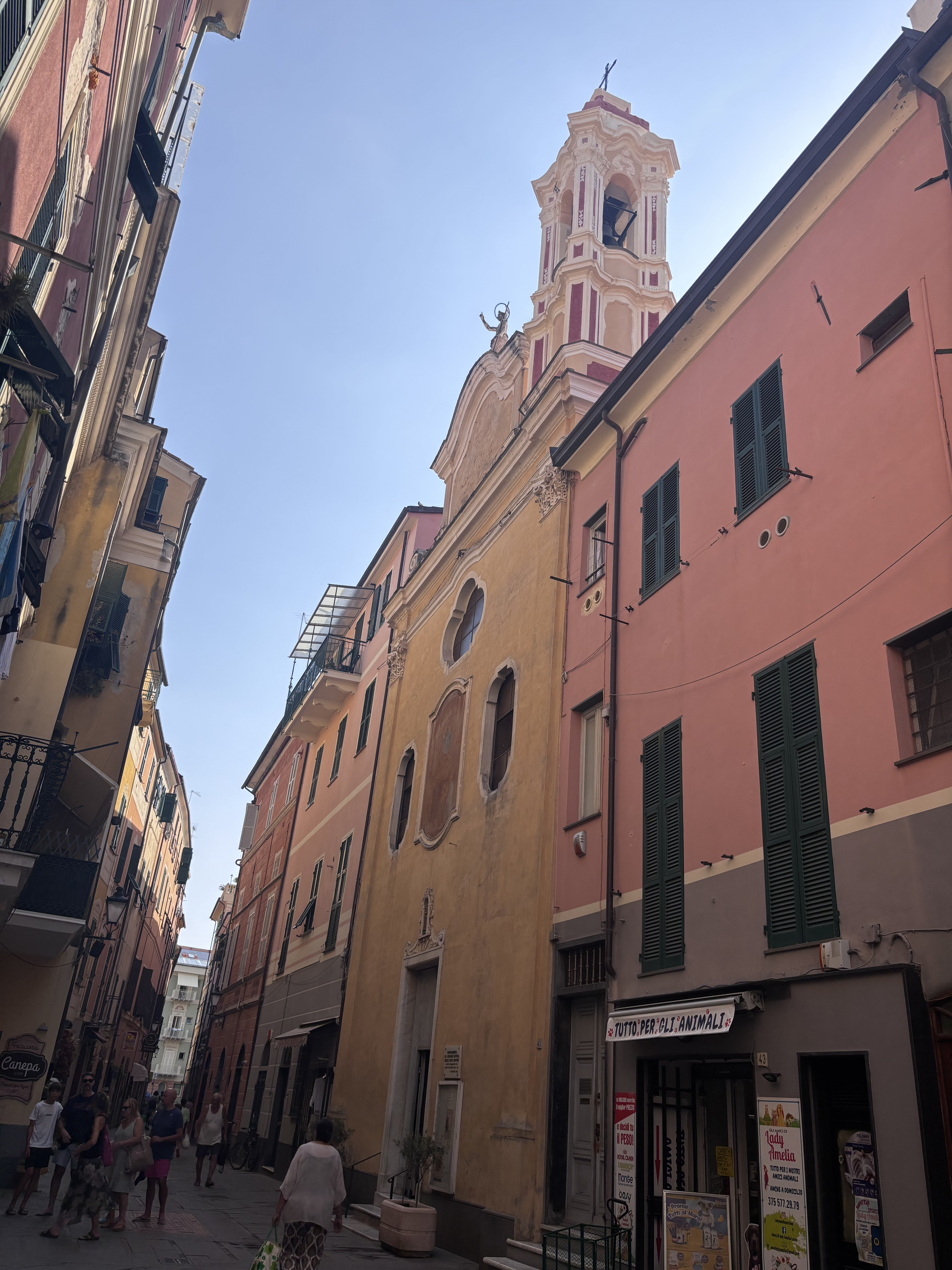
Façade of the Chapel

== History ==
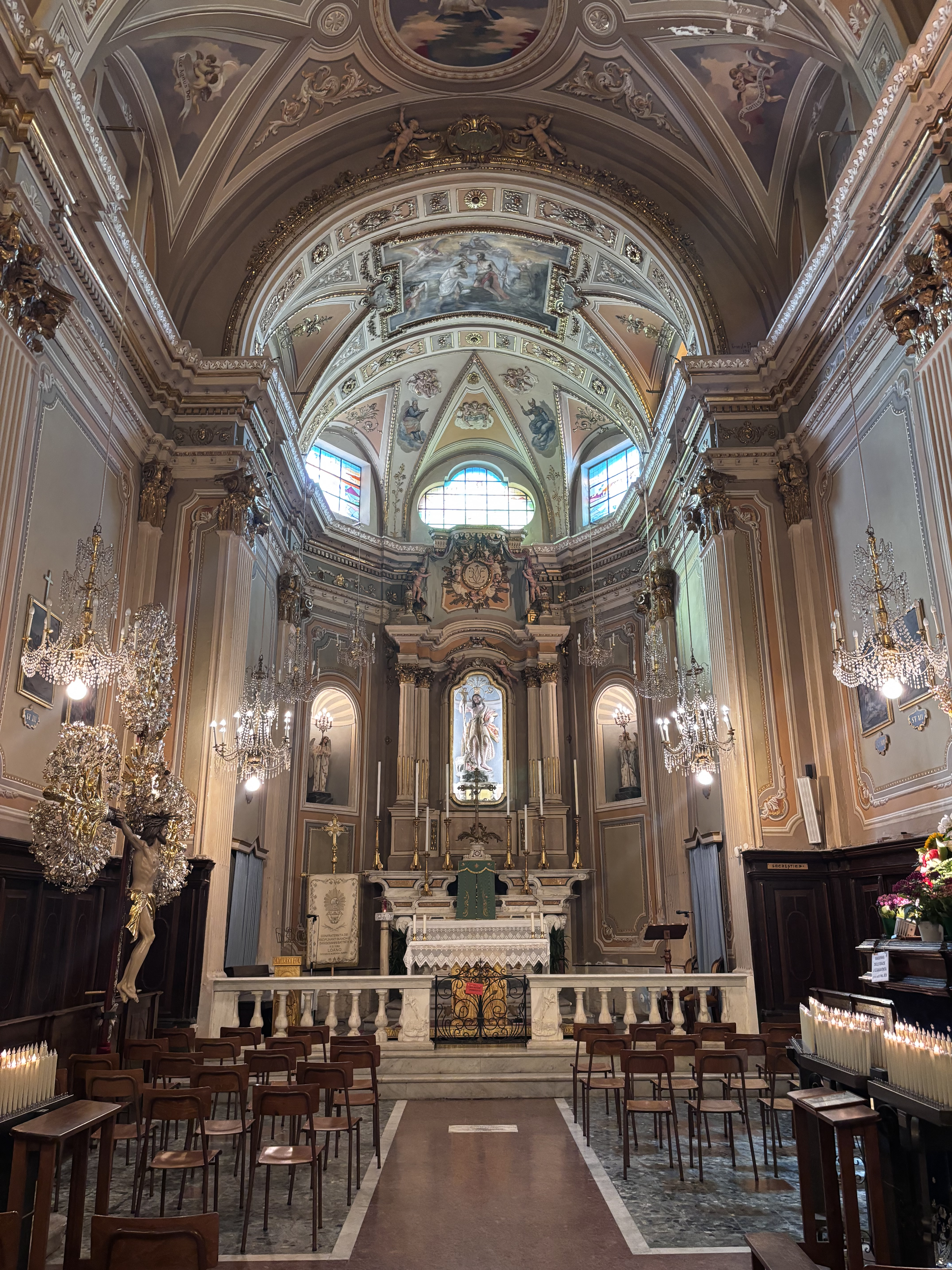
The chapel’s interior

The oratorio was founded in 1262 by the Confraternita dei Disciplinati Bianchi di San Giovanni Battista, to be used as their main place of worship. The confraternity still uses and runs the church today, and is one of the oldest in Italy.

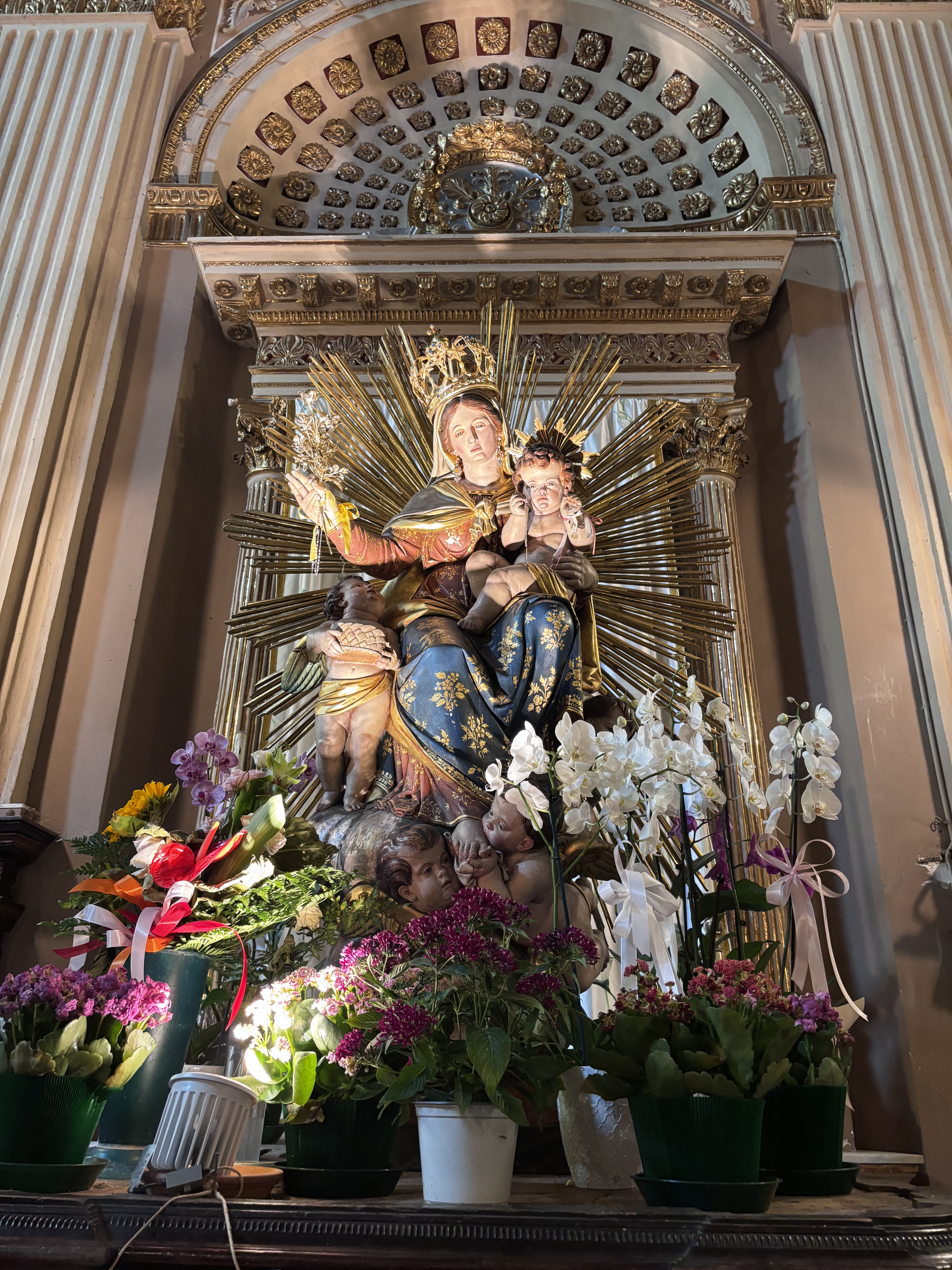
The chapel’s statue of the Virgin Mary

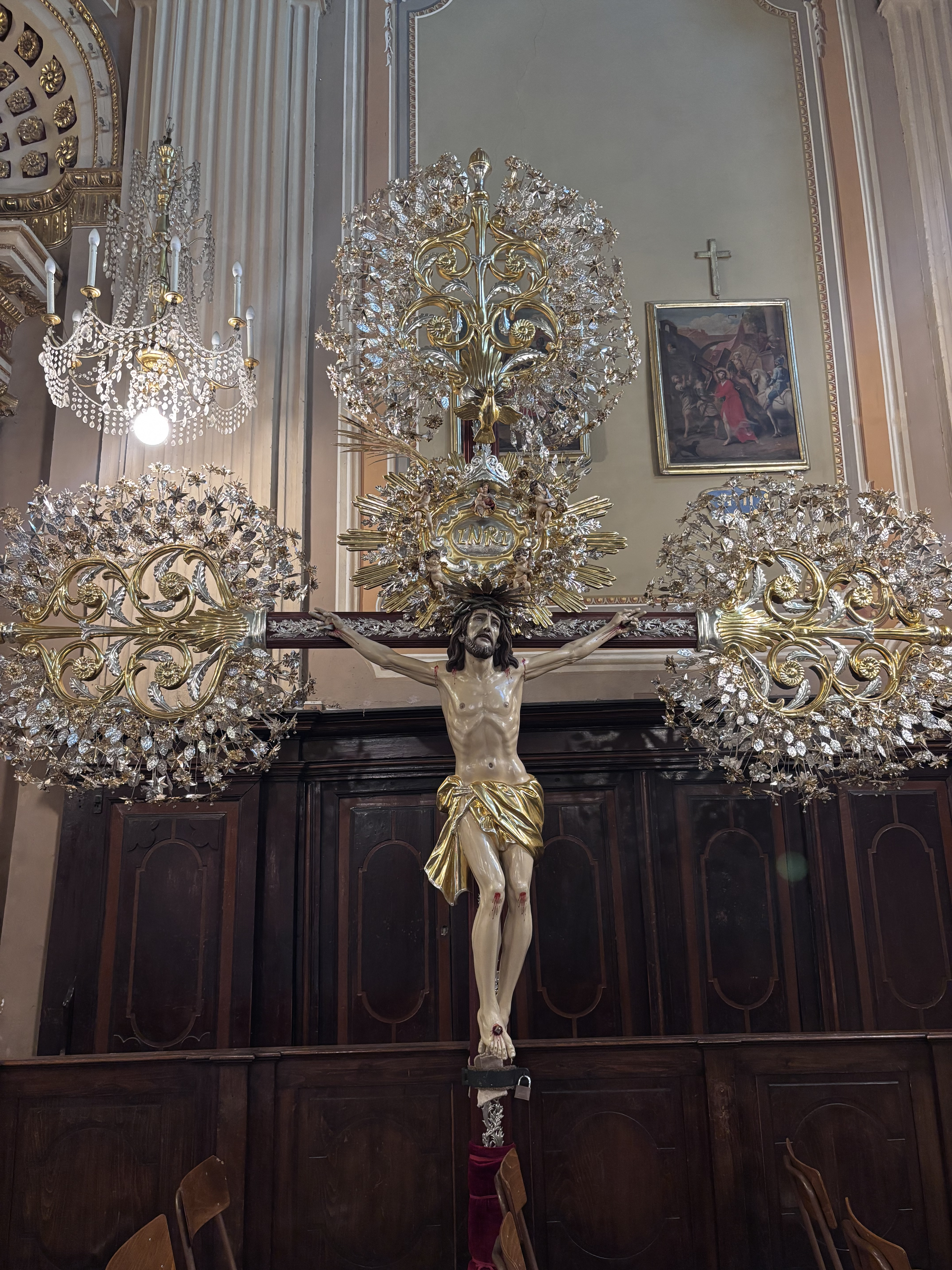
One of the chapel’s crucifixes

The building's earliest phase dates to the 8th century, and therefore it is among the earliest Christian sites in Loano. It later became the church of the Benedictine Abbey of Saint John, inhabited by Benedictine nuns. Following their expulsion under a papal brief issued by Pope Alexander IV in 1257, the nuns left Loano in 1260. The church itself is associated with the parish church of Saints John and Mary, which, according to tradition, was donated by Charlemagne to the Benedictines of the Abbey of San Pietro in Varatella (Toirano). With the establishment of the new coastal settlement, founded by Count Raffo Doria, son of the first Count of Loano, Prince Oberto Doria, during the 14th century, the Church of Saint John the Baptist became the parish church of the emerging town. This role was later transferred to the Duomo of San Giovanni Battista, Loano.

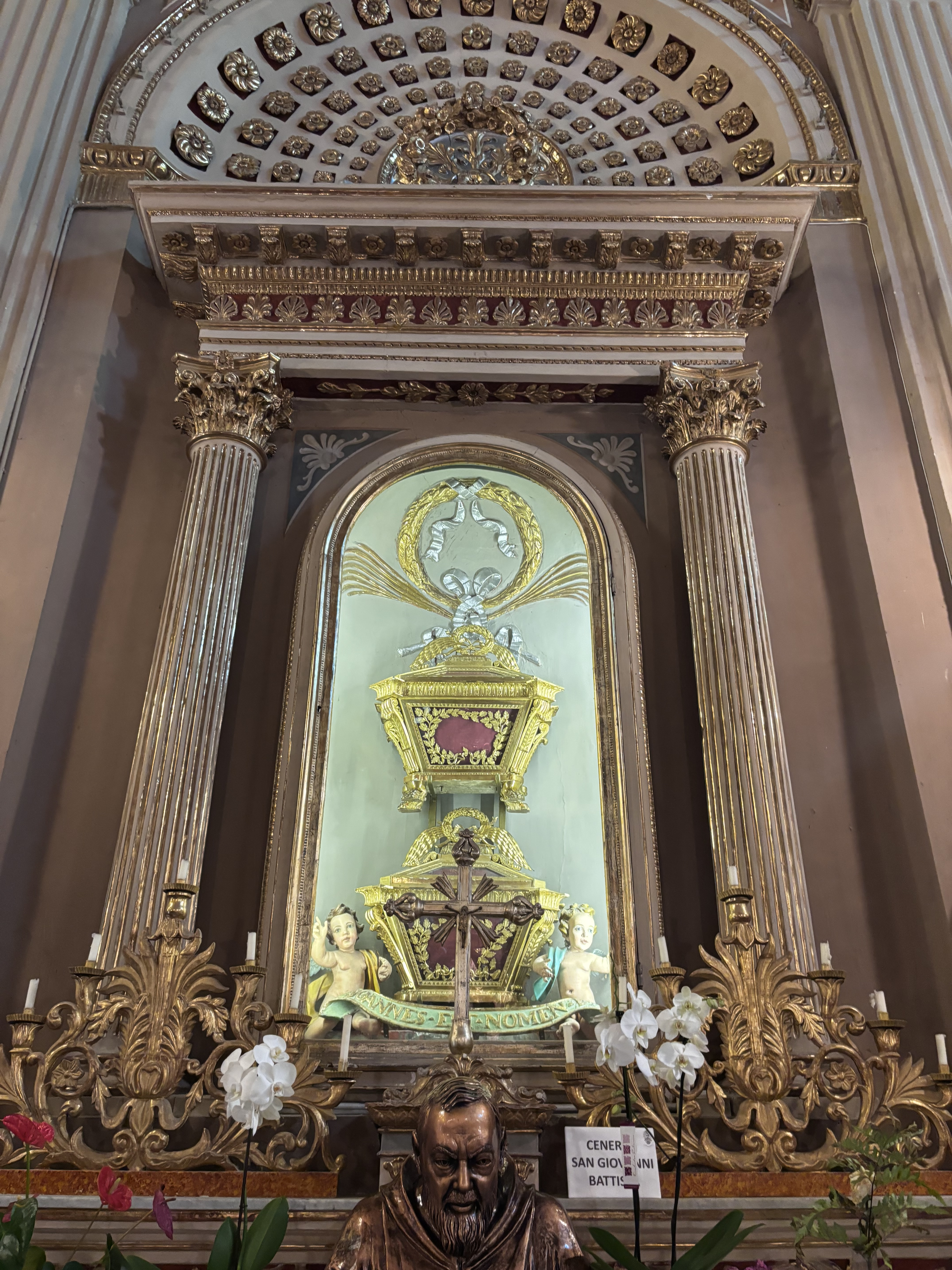
Reliquary of the ashes of Saint John the Baptist

The building's present appearance is the result of an 18th-century reconstruction, while much of the interior reflects 19th-century alterations. The most recent restoration and conservation works were carried out between 1989 and 1990. Of particular interest, in addition to the processional crucifixes and wooden statues, are the reliquaries containing part of the relics of Saint John the Baptist, which were brought from Genoa and donated to the confraternity by the Doria princes. The confraternity of the Disciplinants, known as the “White Hoods” (Cappe Bianche), was founded in 1269.
