= Capo dell'Arma Lighthouse =

Lighthouse in Italy

Capo dell'Arma
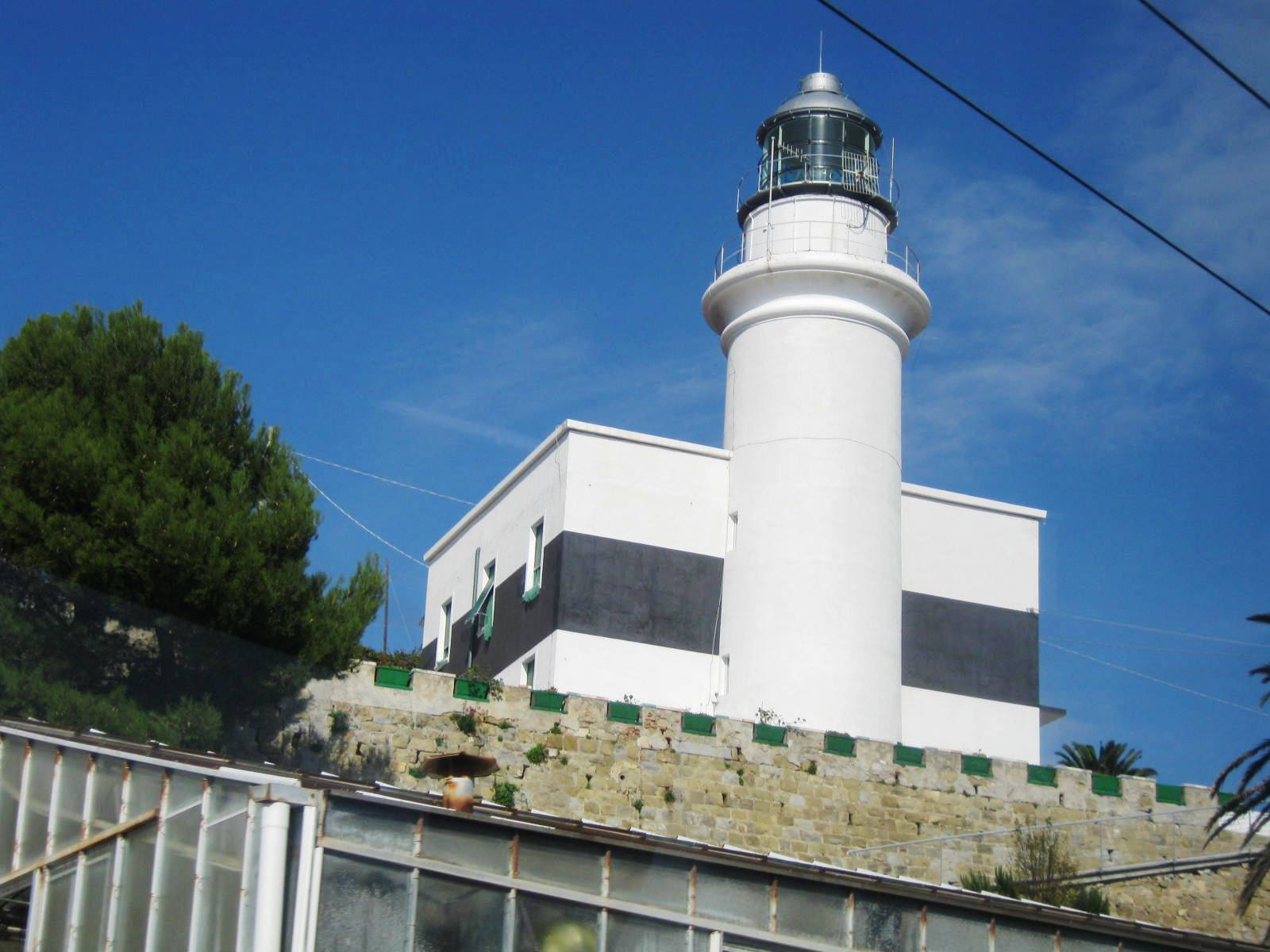
- Capo dell'Arma Lighthouse
- Location: Bussana; Liguria; Italy
- Coordinates: 43°49′02″N 7°49′54″E

Tower
- Constructed: 1912 (first)
- Construction: masonry tower
- Automated: yes
- Height: 15 metres (49 ft)
- Shape: cylindrical tower with balcony and lantern on the roof of a two-story keeper's house
- Markings: white tower, white and black horizontal band keeper's house
- Power source: mains electricity
- Operator: Marina Militare

Light
- First lit: 1948 (current)
- Focal height: 50 metres (160 ft)
- Lens: Type OR; Focal length: 300mm
- Intensity: main: AL 1000 W reserve: LABI 100 W
- Range: main: 24 nautical miles (44 km; 28 mi) reserve: 18 nautical miles (33 km; 21 mi)
- Characteristic: FI (2) W 15s.
- Italy no.: 1474 E.F.

Capo dell'Arma Lighthouse (Italian: Faro di Capo dell'Arma) is an active lighthouse in northwestern Italy. It is located on a cape near the village of Bussana in the comune of Sanremo, in the province of Imperia. It is the first lighthouse on the Ligurian coast, starting from the French border.

== History ==
The original structure was built by the Civil Engineers in 1912 and was activated by the Regia Marina to illuminate this part of the sea border. It was electrified in 1936. During World War II the original structure was completely destroyed by German retreating troops, but was quickly rebuilt by the Navy and the project was completed in 1948.

The lighthouse is completely controlled and operated by the Command Area Lighthouses Navy based in La Spezia, which incidentally takes care of all the lighthouses in the Tyrrhenian Sea. The Marina Militare is responsible for managing all the lights on an approximate 8000 kilometers of Italian coastline since 1910, using both military and civilian technicians.

== See also ==
- List of lighthouses in Italy
