= Bussana Vecchia =

Former ghost town in Liguria, Italy

- Frazione
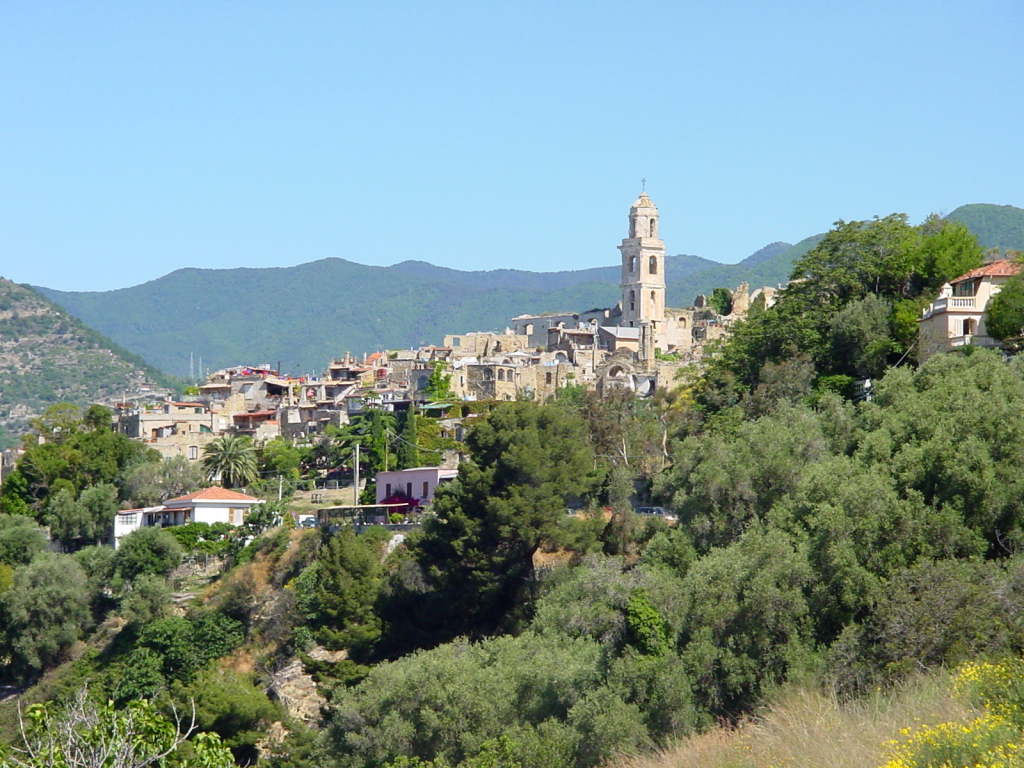

- Location of Bussana Vecchia in Italy
- Coordinates: 43°50′12.47″N 7°49′47.99″E
- Country: Italy
- Region: Liguria
- Province: Imperia (IM)
- Comune: Sanremo
- Elevation: 200 m (660 ft)

Population (2001)
  - Total: 66
- Demonym: Bussanesi
- Time zone: UTC+1 (CET)
  - Summer (DST): UTC+2 (CEST)
- Postal code: 18038
- Dialing code: (+39) 0184
- Website: bussanavecchia.com

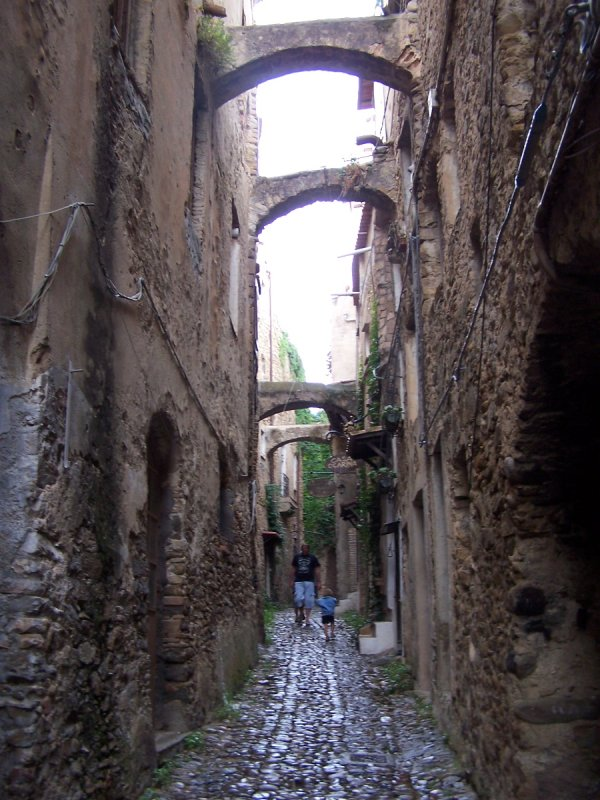
A typical street in present-day Bussana Vecchia

Bussana Vecchia is a former ghost town in Liguria, Italy. Abandoned due to an earthquake in 1887, it was renovated and repopulated by an international community of artists in the early 1960s. It is administratively a hamlet (frazione) of the city of Sanremo, near the border with France. To this day, it is home to a small group of local inhabitants as well as international artists, with craft shops, cafes, and restaurants, and has over the years gained the reputation of a rural artists' residence within the setting of a medieval village.

== Physical geography ==
The town is located about 8 km northeast of Sanremo on a rocky hill behind Bussana Nuova. The land it occupies is relatively green, surrounded by Mediterranean scrub, chestnut groves, and maritime pines; however, the entire area has recently been used as an industrial zone, mainly for floriculture.

== History ==
=== Early history ===
Bussana was founded in Roman times, and originally named Armedina or Armedana; it was only in the 7th century, however, that the first evidence of stable settlements appeared. Following Lombard invasions, the local population decided to move to the underlying Valle Armea, where it remained until the 10th century, when frequent Saracen invasions forced them to move again to a higher and more easily defensible area. The construction of the first defensive structures on the hill began around this time.

Beginning in the 11th century, Bussana fell under the control of the Counts of Ventimiglia, who provided for the construction of a first defensive castle.

In the 13th century, the town was bought by the Republic of Genoa, though the approximately 250 inhabitants maintained a relative amount of autonomy. During this time, the original castle lost its defensive function and was converted to a residential structure. The annexed chapel continues to serve as a place of worship for the inhabitants of the village.

Starting from the 15th century, a building boom began in the town, accompanied by a strong demographic increase; in 1404, the first church was completed, built on the remains of a previous one, and dedicated to Saint Giles. At the same time the houses, built according to the Roman style with square stones, began to be made using rounded stones from the nearby rocky beaches. The original abandoned castle is now in ruins. In the 16th century, the town expanded to the southeast, and it is to this period that almost all the buildings currently present in the village can be dated. The 17th century saw the complete renovation of the local church, which passed from the original Romanesque style to the Baroque.

Life in the village continued relatively quietly, so much so that over the next two centuries, the settlement remained essentially unchanged. The population was predominantly rural, subsisting on agriculture, cultivation of olives and citrus fruits, and small-scale animal husbandry.

Beginning in the 19th century, the first signs of the dangerousness of the place began to be felt, with an increasing understanding of the seismic risk of the area. The first notable earthquakes were recorded in 1831, 1851, and 1854, and this led the population to reinforce the existing structures with arches and columns.

=== Earthquake ===
A marble memorial in remembrance of those who died in the Earthquake in Bussana Vecchia

The French Riviera and western Liguria are at the junction of the southwestern Alps and the Liguria basin, a region of moderate seismicity. The severest earthquake to hit Bussana struck the region on 23 February 1887, killing more than 2,000 people. The worst of the damage in Bussana occurred at 6:21 on that Ash Wednesday morning, as a seismic wave lasting 20 seconds caused immediate destruction and deaths throughout the village.

The earthquake was the first recorded by a true seismograph built by Filippo Cecchi in Moncalieri, Italy.

Most buildings in Bussana were severely damaged and the authorities decided to rebuild the village on a new site downhill called Bussana Nuova ("New Bussana"), which had until then been known as Capo Marine. The old village was abandoned and all of its buildings declared too dangerous for habitation.

In 1889, the cornerstone of the town of Bussana Nuova was laid, and in 1894 the Bussanesi abandoned the original village, celebrating their last Mass on Palm Sunday. The original town, from that moment, would be known as Bussana Vecchia ("Old Bussana").

=== Rebirth ===
In 1947, immigrants from southern Italy started illegally settling the ghost town. After a few forced evictions by the Italian police in the 1950s, the authorities ordered the destruction of all first-floor stairways and rooftops.

Despite this, in the early 1960s, Vanni Giuffrè, a Sicilian painter, together with a group of artists, the Community of International Artists (now International Artists' Village), decided to move to what was by then commonly known as Bussana Vecchia. The spirit of the organization was somewhat idealistic: to be able to live simply and to work artistically within the village.

The settlement had no electricity, tap water, or sanitation, but the new community of inhabitants grew from the small original nucleus to around 20–30 people by 1968, mostly hippie artists coming from all over Europe (Italy, Austria, England, France, Denmark, Germany, and Sweden).

Tensions with the old inhabitants and with the police grew until, on 25 July 1968, an eviction was ordered again and the police were sent to the village to enforce it. When the police forces arrived, they were faced with the villagers behind barricades refusing to leave and by a large group of international news reporters. The police decided to avoid confrontation.

The first internal problems surrounding the legal recognition of properties in the village arose in the early 70s. Private property began to emerge as a necessity, in stark contrast to the initial ideals of the community of artists. In the meantime, the descendants of the original inhabitants of the town founded the "Amici di Bussana" ("Friends of Bussana") association, with the intention of regaining possession of the areas belonging to their ancestors, and they proceeded to enclose and declare the whole northern area of the town as their own.

=== Today ===
During the past sixty years, Bussana Vecchia has been partially rebuilt by its new inhabitants. The International Artists' Village was born, and despite periodic confrontations with the authorities (the latest eviction order was issued in 1997 when all buildings were declared property of the Italian Government), the community is still living there, selling its handiwork to tourists, and organizing artistic events. The artists and craftsmen, who live and work in Bussana Vecchia, have turned it into what it is today: an oasis of creativity, a unique and special place in the world.

In 1974, the municipal aqueduct was connected to the town. In 1976, a meeting was held with all the villagers to discuss the future of the settlement, and it was decided to launch the "Committee of the Village of Bussana Vecchia". This committee was then officially recognized by the municipality of Sanremo, which thus also recognized the new toponymy of "Bussana Vecchia". In the same year, the first residences were legally recognized and in 1977, electricity was connected to the entire town.

By the early 1980s, the resident population had risen to around a hundred people. However, the inhabitants were no longer exclusively artists: the economic-speculative boom of the time led many people to think that they could make easy profits with summer tourism, opening up more cheap craft shops, and thus lowering the quality level of the artistic productions.

The development of the village now also involved the Municipality of Sanremo, which in 1982 announced an international competition to decide on the restructuring to be implemented at the site. In the meantime, the "New International Artists' Community" was officially recognized as a group which spoke for all the inhabitants of the village.

In December 2017, the Italian Department of State Property (Demanio) sent tax settlements of tens of thousands of Euros to all the inhabitants and termed them "occupiers". Fear arose within the village that the "Bussanesi" might lose their homes, which they had rebuilt from ruins. That same month, the Bussanesi launched a petition to "Save Bussana Vecchia". The Italian Department of State Property is planning to transfer full responsibility for Bussana Vecchia to the City of Sanremo starting in 2018.

In March 2019, the M5S (Five Star Movement) political party threatened to begin evicting all residents of Bussana Vecchia unless the Municipality of Sanremo comes up with a plan for long-overdue repairs and maintenance by the end of April 2019, citing issues of safety for residents of the village, and in the interests of safeguarding the former ghost town for its unique tourist attractions. As of September 2019, the motion had been suspended and is up for review in January 2020.

== Attractions ==
The village of Bussana Vecchia can be toured entirely on foot in about an hour. One of the major attractions for tourists are the characteristic shops and ateliers, which can be seen and visited almost everywhere in the village. The old church of Saint Giles, never restored, still shows traces of the original stuccos and paintings; it can only be visited from the outside, as it is structurally unsafe. The church belfry miraculously escaped the earthquake, and is seen by the inhabitants of Bussana Vecchia as the symbol of the town. The Oratory of John the Baptist, located in the eastern part of the town, can also be visited only from the outside.

The town has been used for years by artists from all over the world, and this has influenced the type of events that take place there seasonally. Theatrical events, art exhibitions, and live music, especially on summer evenings, are among the most popular activities.

== Economy ==
The original settlement of Bussana based its economy on the cultivation of olives and citrus fruits, and on fairly limited cereal cultivation. With the growth of interest in floriculture at the end of the 19th century, this possibility was beginning to be explored, and was then carried on by the inhabitants of Bussana Nuova.

Currently, the economy is based entirely on tourism. The village offers bars, eateries, and restaurants offering vegetarian and Ligurian cuisine; additionally there is a bed & breakfast, a botanical garden, a nursery, and numerous workshops for artists and artisans who sell their products.

== Transport ==
By road Bussana Vecchia can be reached by exiting the A10 "dei Fiori" motorway at the Sanremo Est/Arma di Taggia tollbooth, taking the Aurelia Bis to the Valle Armea exit, and following the road signs for Bussana/Bussana Vecchia. The village is accessible only by foot, so it is necessary to park outside the town, on the street.

By train The nearest railway station is Taggia - Arma; a little further away is the Sanremo station.

By bus Buses run from the Sanremo bus station to Bussana Nuova on a regular basis; during the summer, there are sometimes shuttle buses going to Bussana Vecchia from Bussana Nuova or directly from Sanremo.

== Image gallery ==
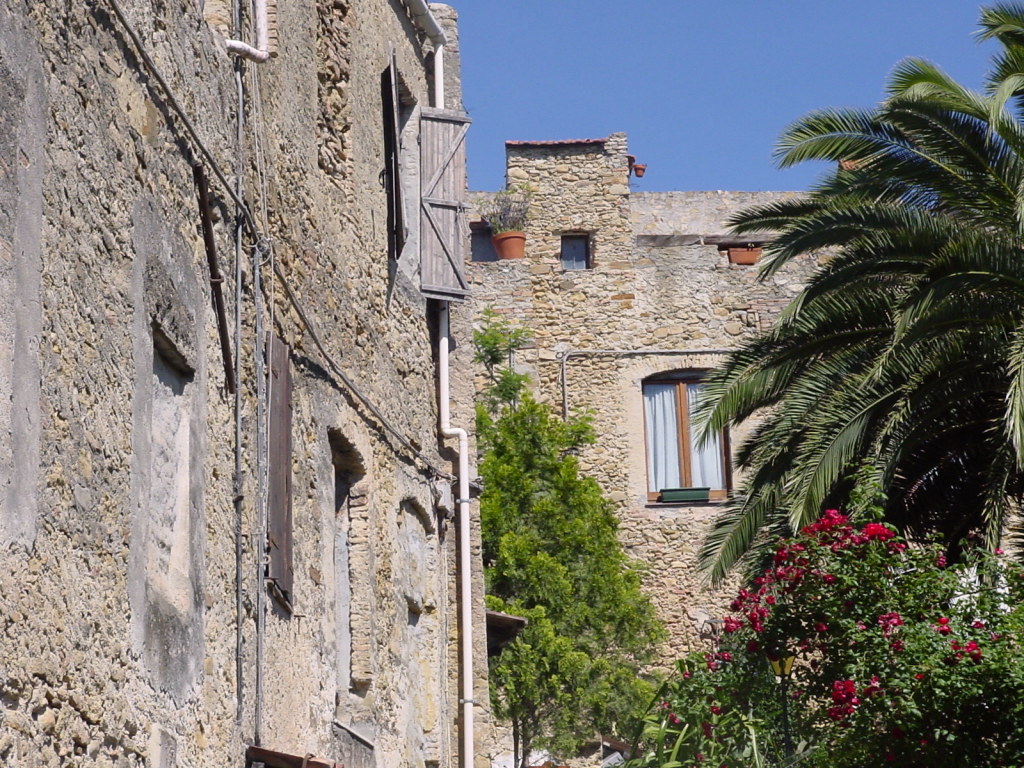
Facades of some houses

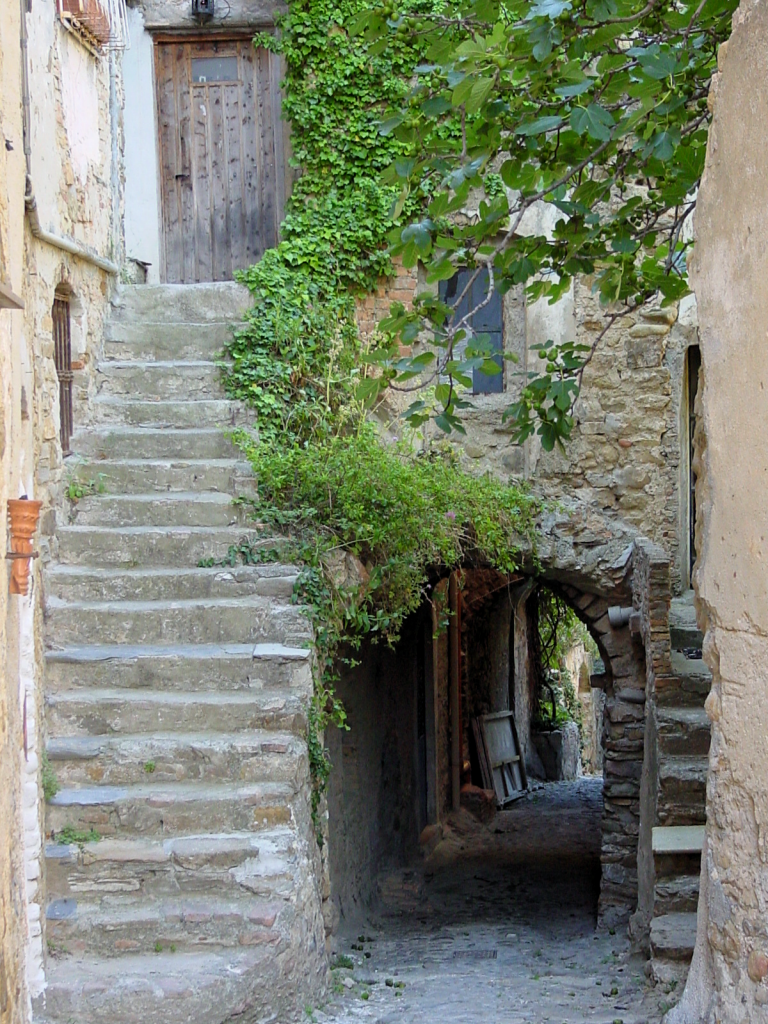
Old house in an inner courtyard

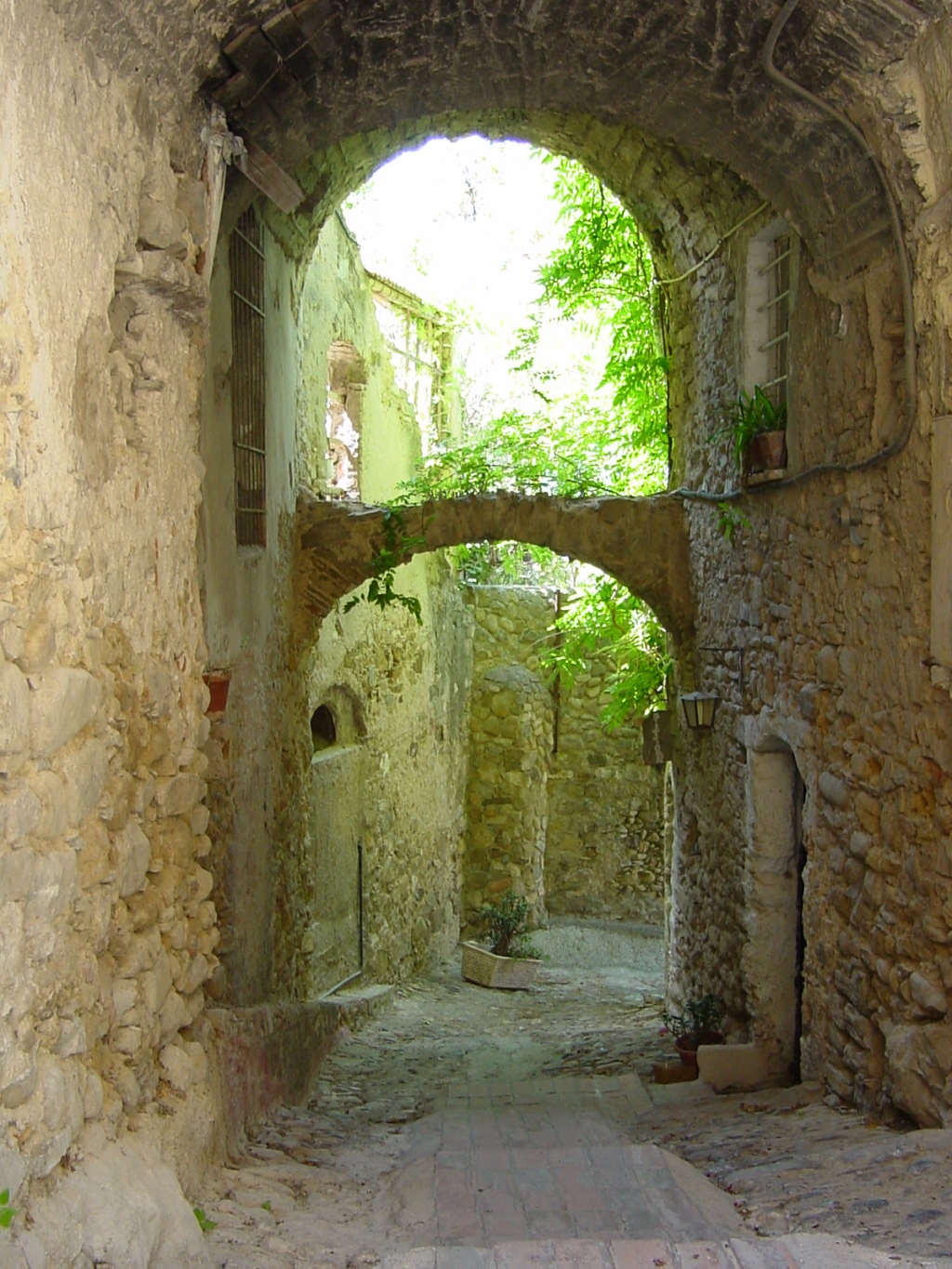
Reinforcement arch for anti-seismic purposes

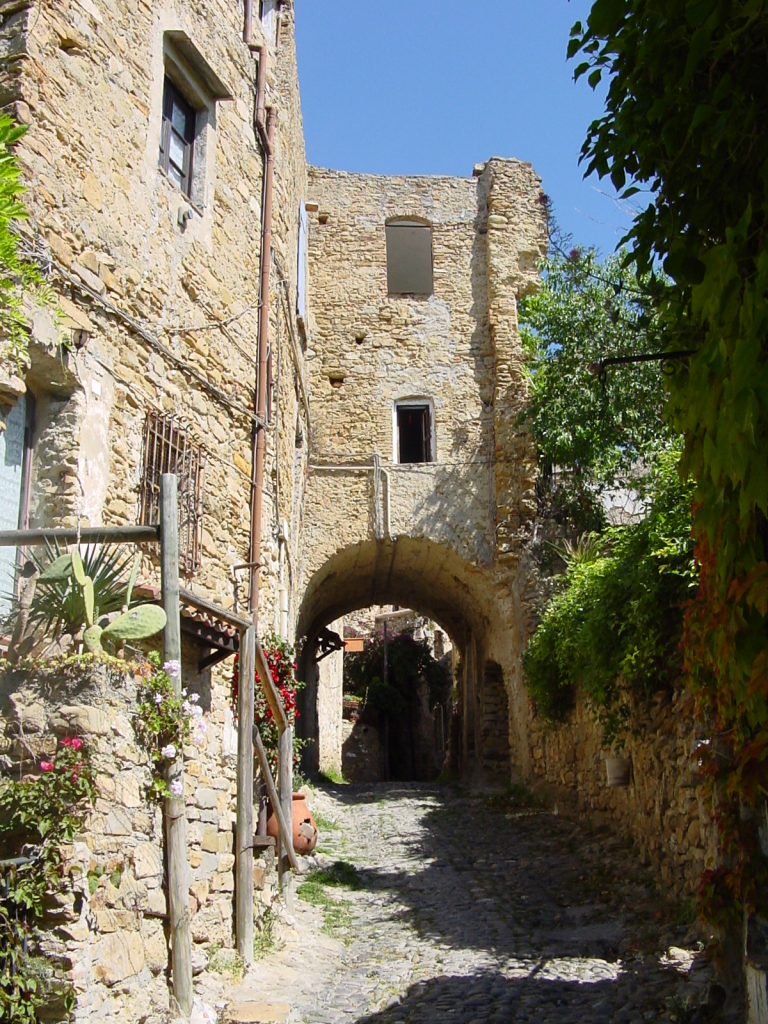
Narrow streets with old houses

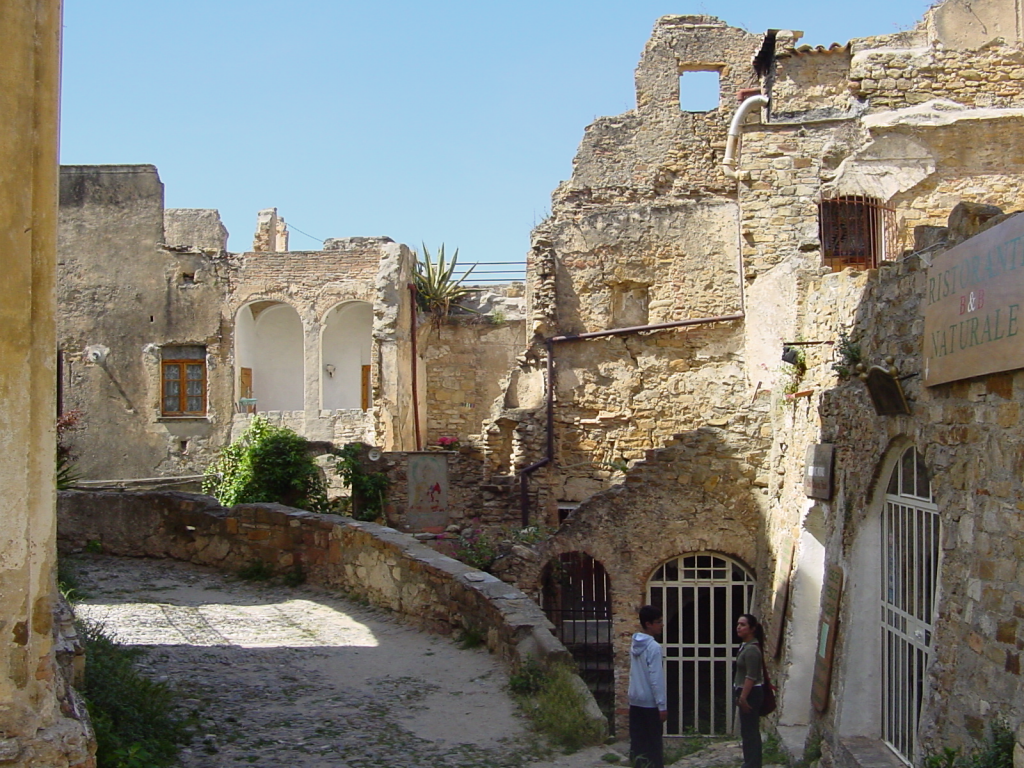
Center of the village, in front of the church of Saint Giles

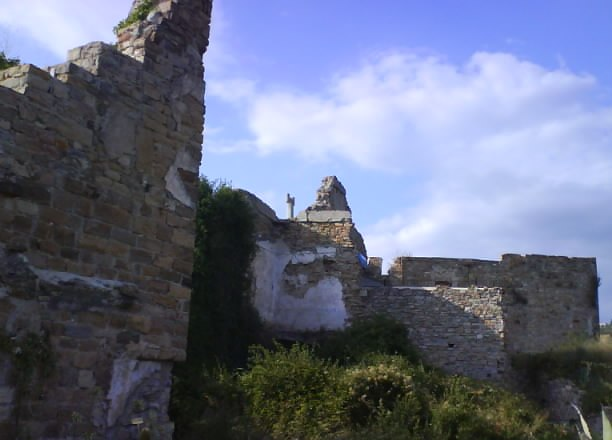
Ruins of old houses

== See also ==
- Bussana Nuova
- Diano Marina earthquake (it)
