= Bussana =

Hamlet in Liguria, Italy

- Frazione
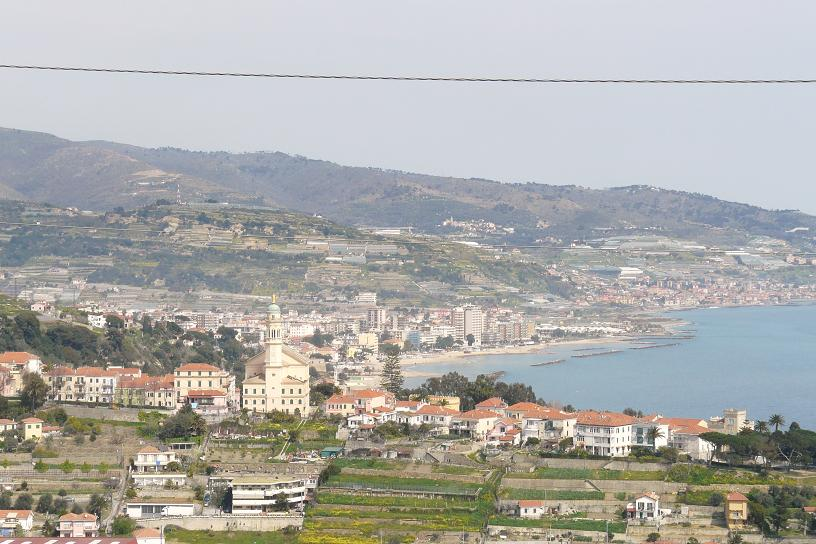
- View of Bussana with Arma di Taggia in background

- Location of Bussana in Italy
- Coordinates: 43°49′29″N 7°50′18″E
- Country: Italy
- Region: Liguria
- Province: Imperia (IM)
- Comune: Sanremo
- Elevation: 50 m (160 ft)

Population (2009)
  - Total: 74
- Demonym: Bussanesi
- Time zone: UTC+1 (CET)
  - Summer (DST): UTC+2 (CEST)
- Postal code: 18038
- Dialing code: (+39) 0184
- Website: Official website

Bussana is an Italian hamlet (frazione) of the municipality of Sanremo in the Province of Imperia, Liguria. As of 2009, its population was 74. The original Bussana (now known as Bussana Vecchia, or Old Bussana) was partly destroyed and abandoned after an earthquake in 1887. The residents founded a new settlement, which is sometimes known as Bussana Nuova (New Bussana).

== History ==
The area where Bussana is situated was already inhabited in Roman times; along the Via del Mare, near the mouth of the Armea river, an archaeological dig uncovered a Roman villa. In 1797, following Napoleon's rule, which caused the fall of the Republic of Genoa, the hamlet was annexed to the Ligurian Republic, and in 1805 to the First French Empire. In 1815, it was incorporated into the Kingdom of Sardinia, and later into the Kingdom of Italy in 1861. In 1887, the original town was destroyed by an earthquake, as a result of which it was abandoned and re-founded a few kilometres downstream.

Bussana was an autonomous comune until April 1928, when it was absorbed by the Sanremo municipality.

Starting from the 1950s, the original, partially destroyed site of Bussana was recolonized by artists, who began calling it Bussana Vecchia, from which Bussana is sometimes distinguished using the name Bussana Nuova.

== Geography ==
The village is located 6 km to the east of Sanremo and 2 km west of Arma di Taggia. It is 3 km from Bussana Vecchia, 5 from Taggia, and 19 from Imperia.

The southern part, known as Bussana Mare (Maritime Bussana), extends along the Tyrrhenian Coast. The Capo dell'Arma Lighthouse is located nearby.

== Gallery ==
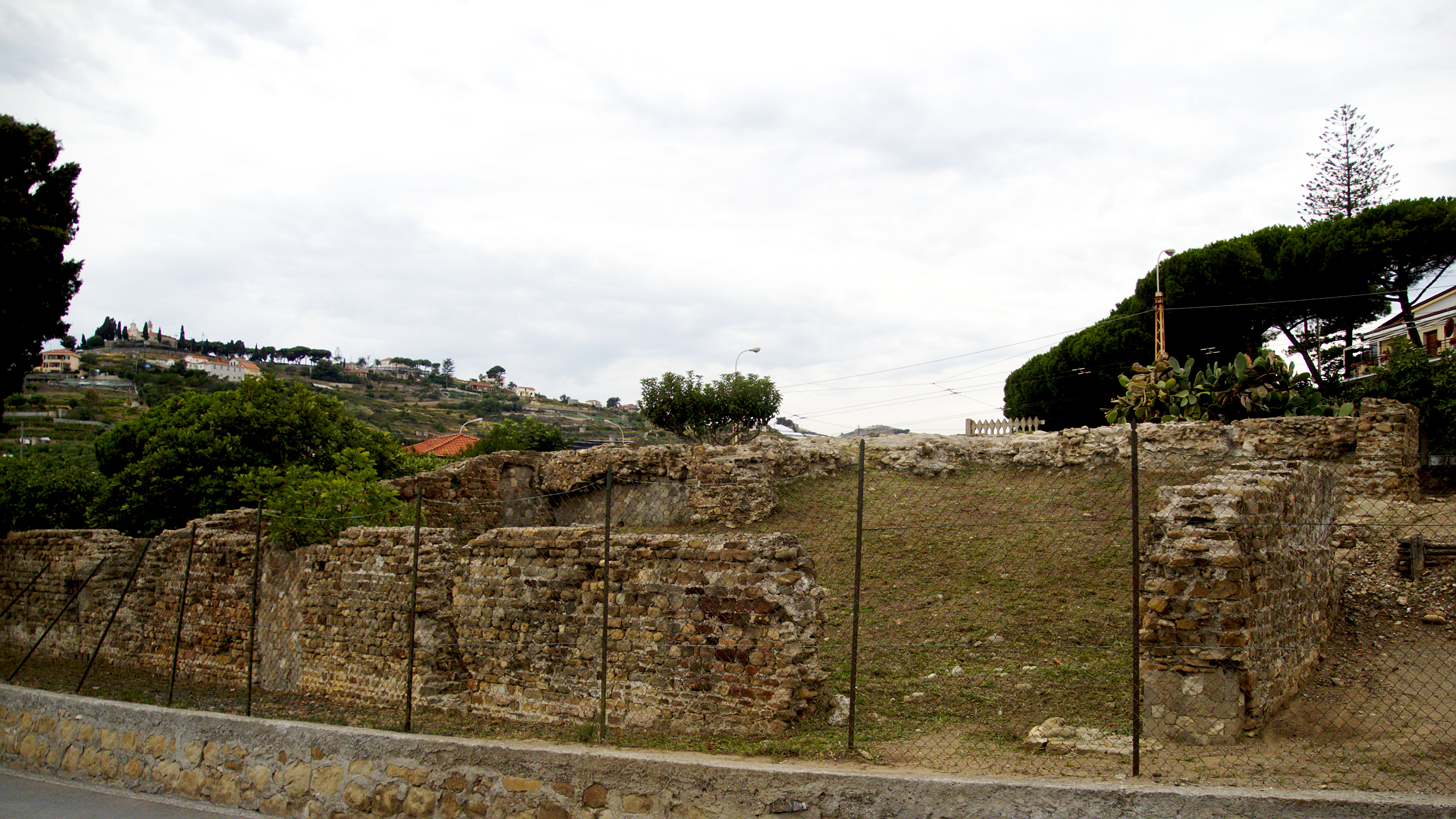
Roman villa

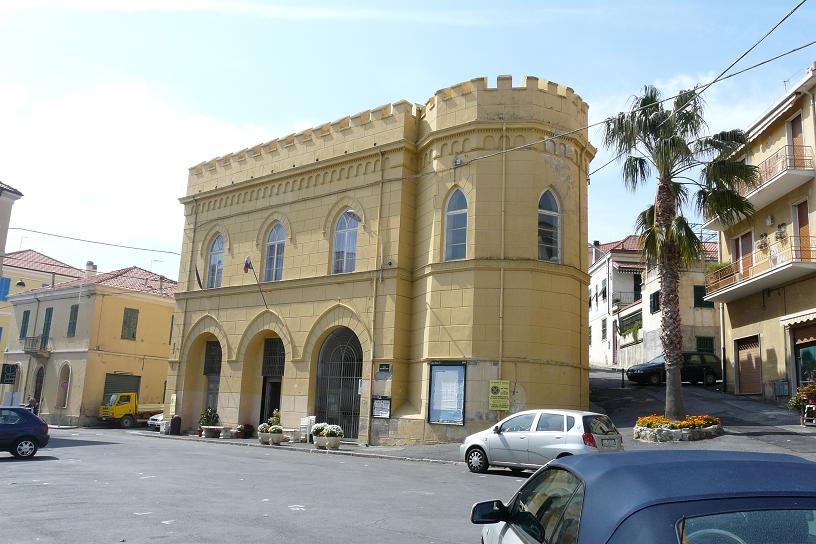
Town centre
