= Loano =

Comune in Liguria, Italy

- Comune
- Comune di Loano
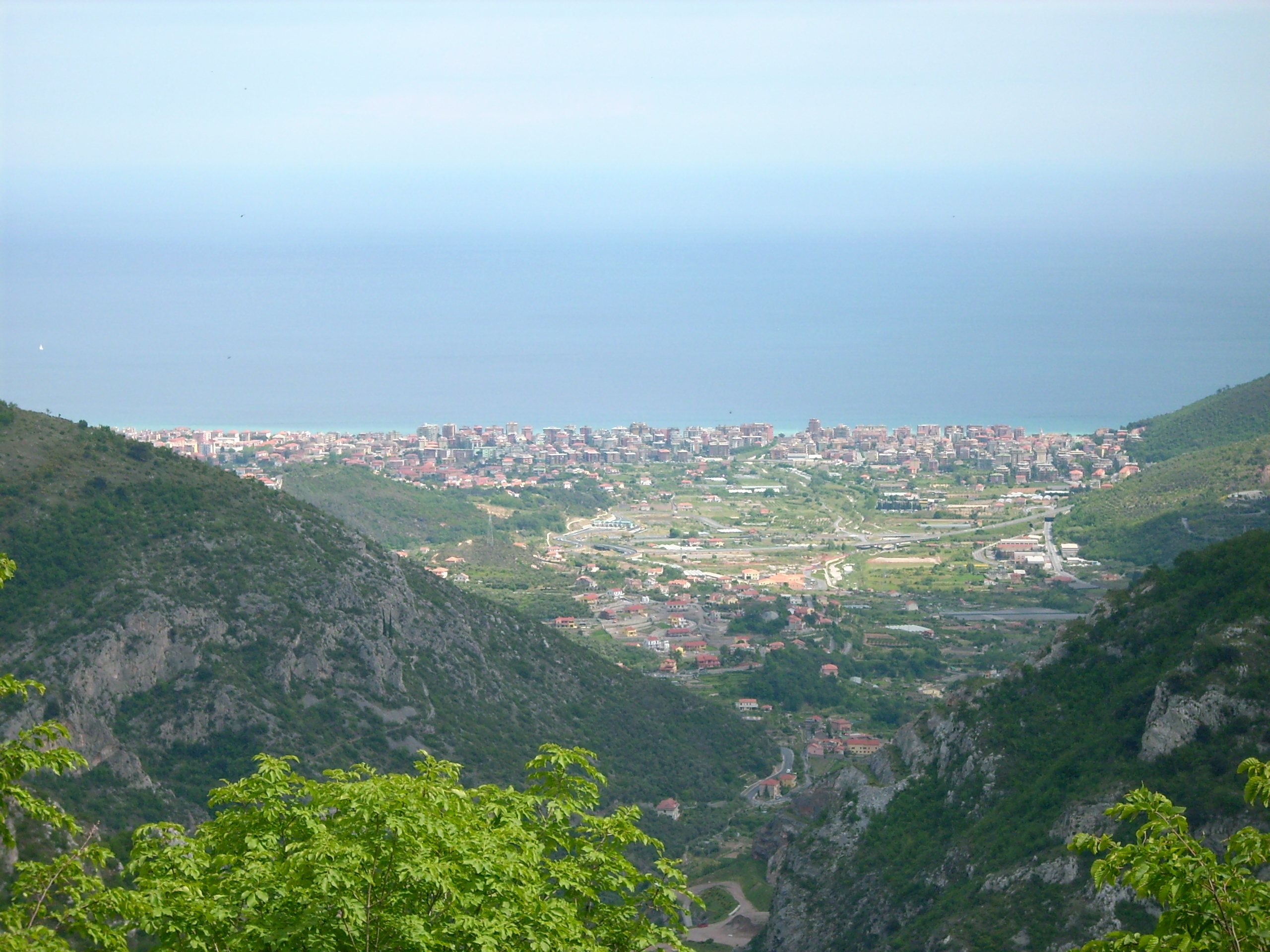
- Loano

- Flag Coat of arms

- Location within Italy Location within Liguria
- Coordinates: 44°7′N 8°15′E
- Country: Italy
- Region: Liguria
- Province: Savona (SV)
- Frazioni: Verzi

Government
  - Mayor: Luca Lettieri

Area
  - Total: 13.5 km^{2} (5.2 sq mi)
- Elevation: 5 m (16 ft)

Population (30 September 2017)
  - Total: 11,319
  - Density: 838/km^{2} (2,170/sq mi)
- Demonym: Loanesi
- Time zone: UTC+1 (CET)
  - Summer (DST): UTC+2 (CEST)
- Postal code: 17025
- Dialing code: 019
- Website: Official website

Loano (Ligurian: Leua) is a comune (municipality) in the Province of Savona in the Italian region Liguria, located about 60 kilometres (37 mi) southwest of Genoa and about 30 kilometres (19 mi) southwest of Savona.

Loano borders the following municipalities: Bardineto, Boissano, Borghetto Santo Spirito, and Pietra Ligure.

== History ==
Loano has pre-Roman origins (prehistoric finds at the San Damiano hill and pre-Roman at the current old city are recent), during the Roman era the villas was built in this territory; a Roman mosaic of the imperial age is visible on the main floor of Palazzo Doria.

In the 8th century, thanks to a Carolingian donation, the territory called Lovenis (corresponding to the first Loanese toponym) was donated to the Benedictine monastery of San Pietro in Varatella (Toirano) who founded the church-sanctuary of Nostra Signora di Loreto near the port.

In 1505, Loano became property of the Doria family, a noble genovese family, who would rule the territory for 232 years, until 1737. The Doria family made Loano into a more powerful town, and the military base for the territory was located there.

Giovanni Andrea Doria, who inherited the land from his brother Pagano in 1574, began a rapid expansion of the city, creating numerous houses, aqueducts and a hospital, turning it into an 'Imperial City'. The Doria Family had the rights to mint coins in Loano. This project was continued by his son, Andrea II, with the construction of the Convent of Monte Carmelo in 1602.

In 1795, Loano was the site of the Battle of Loano, fought by the French First Republic and the Kingdom of Sardinia, which lasted three days, and resulted in a French victory.

In 1878, Loano took control of the nearby comune of Verzi Pietra.

== Historical sites and monuments ==
=== Religious Sites ===
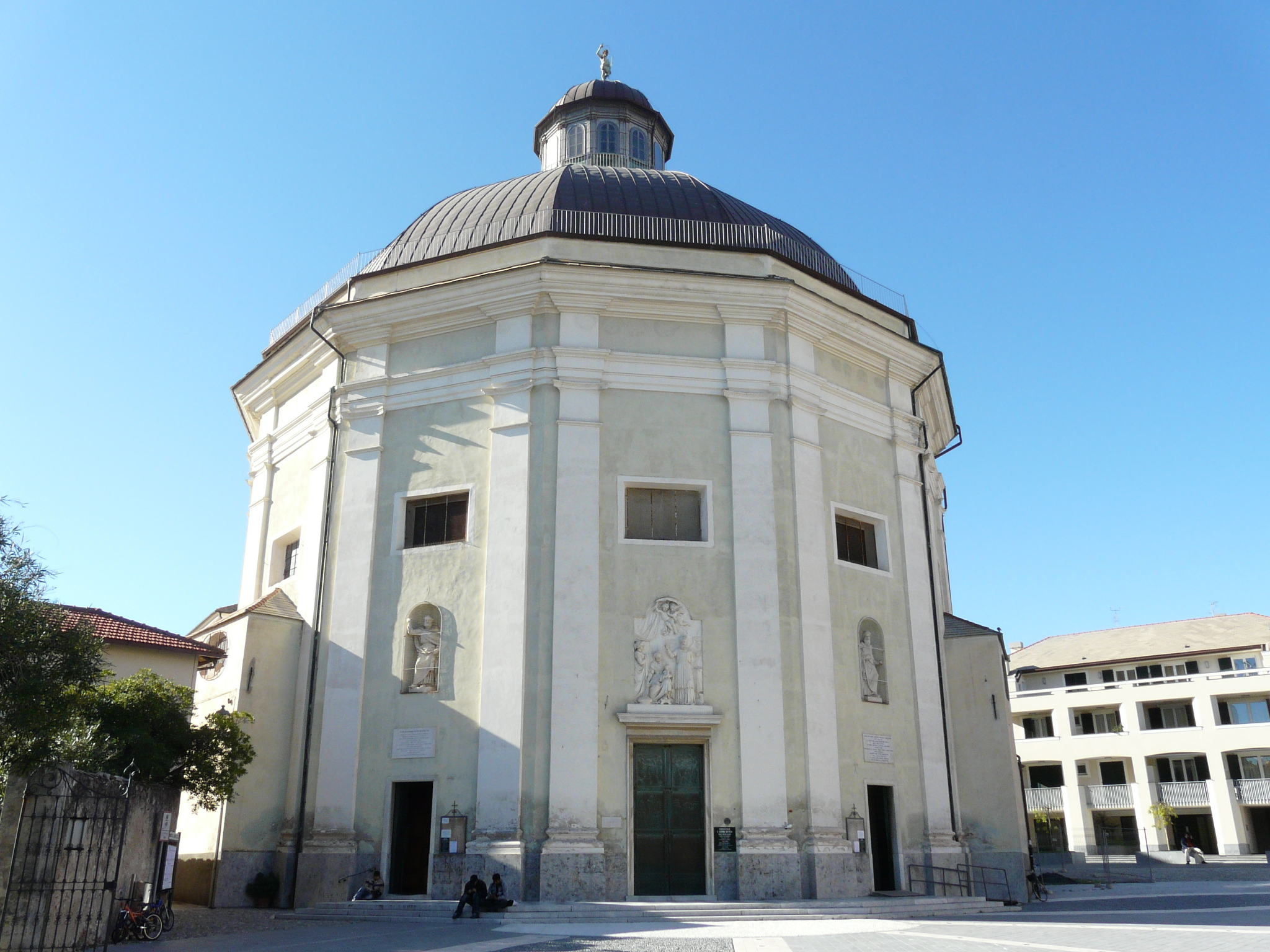
The Duomo of San Giovanni Battista

- Duomo of Loano, located in the old town. Built between 1633 and 1638 by the Doria family; it serves as the Cathedral of Loano.

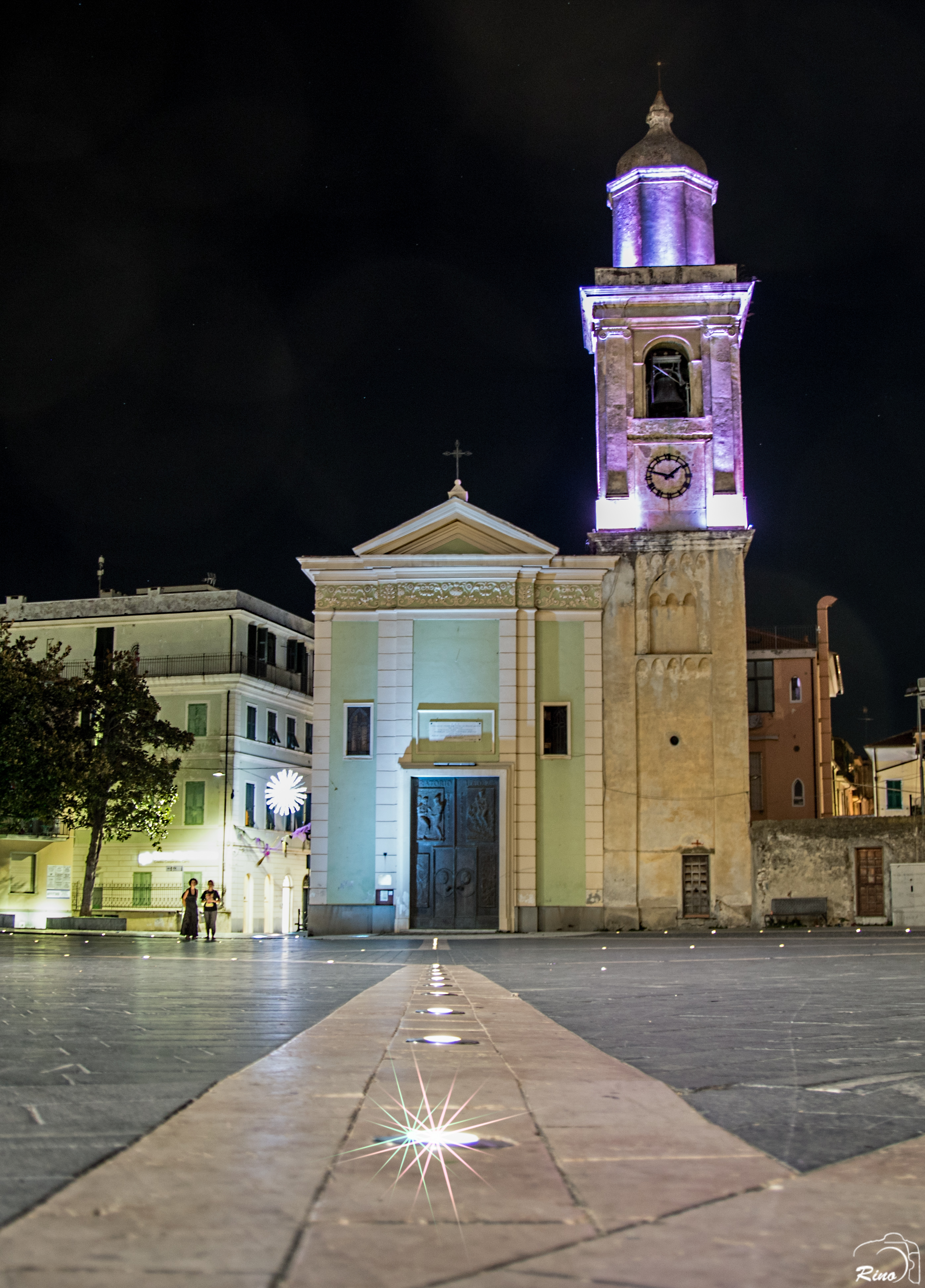
The Oratorio di Nostra Signora del Rosario at night

- Oratorio di Nostra Signora del Rosario, located near the Duomo. It was constructed in 1661 and houses the Confraternity of the Turchini.

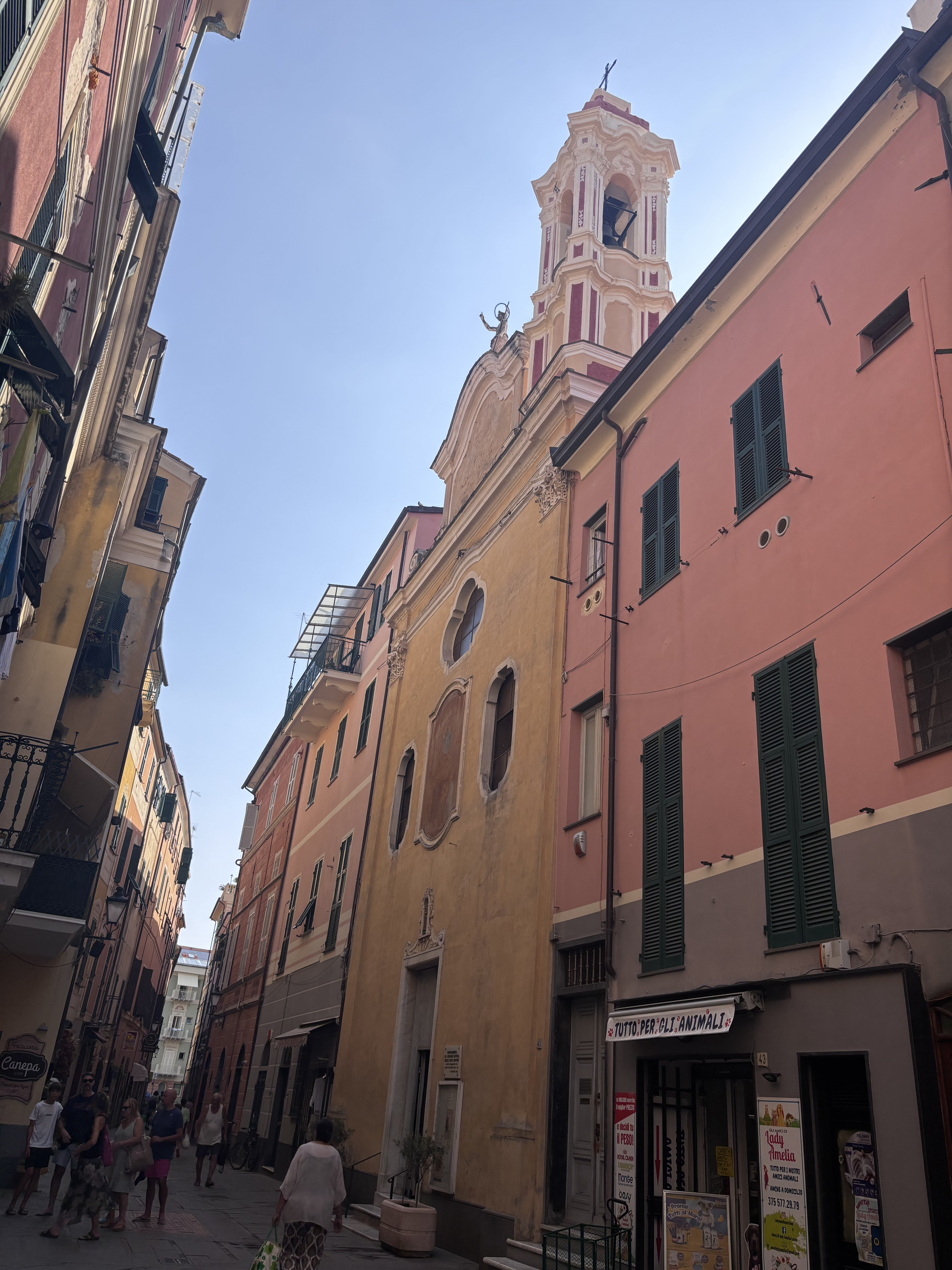
The Oratorio of San Giovanni Battista

- Oratorio of San Giovanni Battista, Loano, located in Via Boragine. Built in 1262, it is one of the oldest in Italy, and houses a portion of the ashes of Saint John the Baptist.

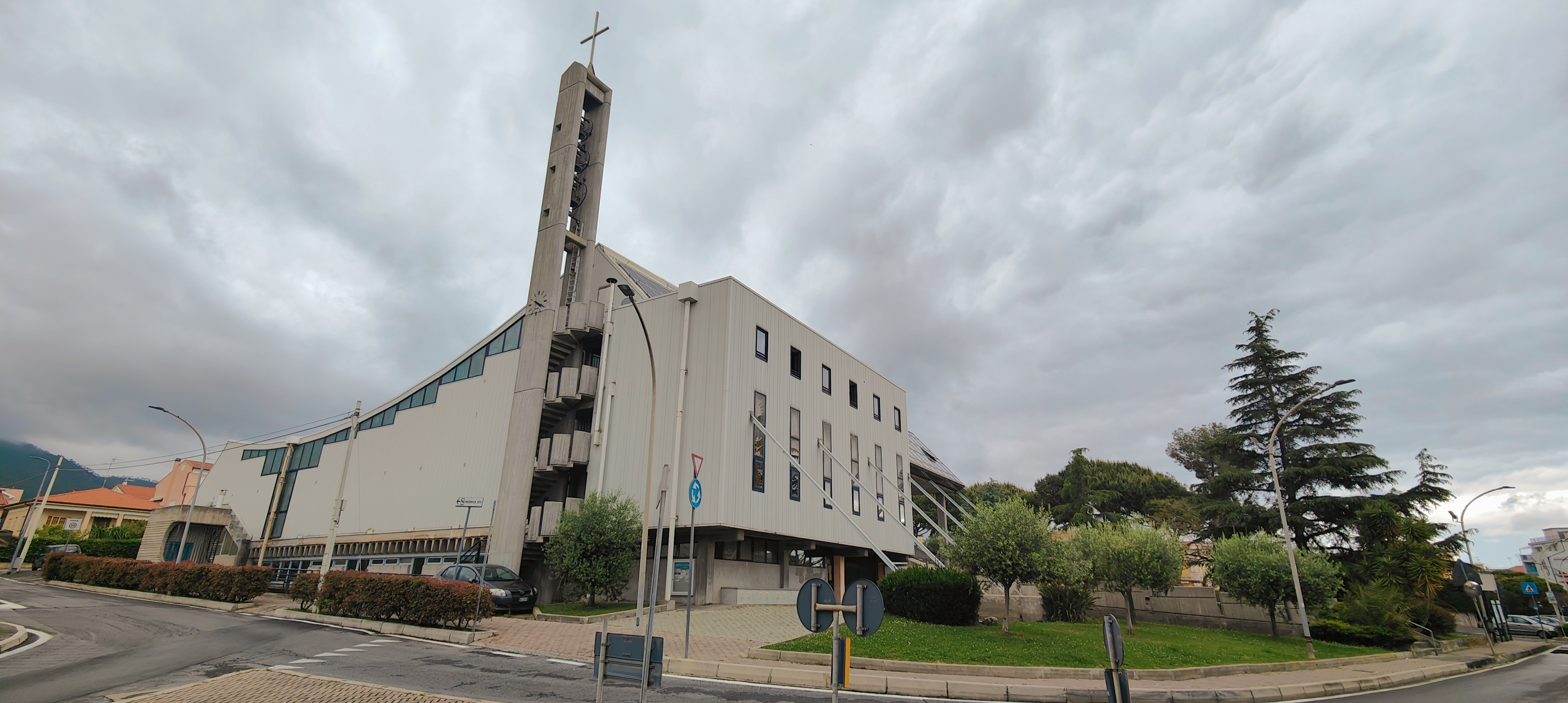
Church of Saint Pius X

- Church of Saint Pius X - Built between 1975 and 1990, it is located in the outskirts of Loano and is the most recently constructed church in Loano.

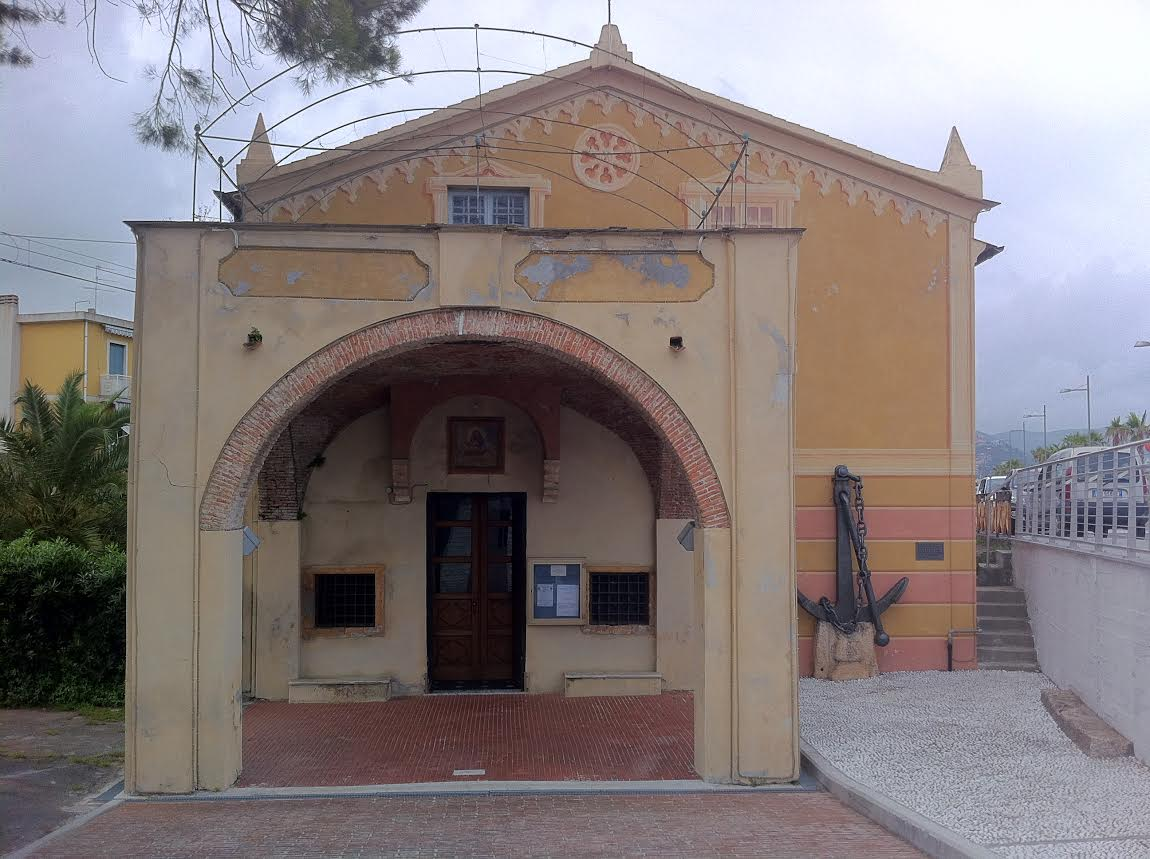
Sanctuary of Nostra Signora di Loreto

- Sanctuary of Nostra Signora di Loreto/Madonna della Neve - Founded in the 8th century, the current structure dates back to the 15th century and is located along the Port of Loano. Much of the interior was decorated during the 17th and 18th centuries.

=== Civil Buildings ===
- Palazzo Doria, located near the Duomo. Built between 1574 and 1578 for the Doria family, it is now the Town Hall of Loano.
- Palazzo Kursaal, located on the Riviera of Loano. It is home to the library and a museum dedicated to the sea and the city of Loano.

== Notable residents ==
- Maria Rosa Raimondi, mother of Giuseppe Garibaldi, was born in Loano in 1776.
- Giuseppe Valerga, Latin Patriarch of Jerusalem, was born in Loano in 1813.

== Twin towns ==
- Francheville, France, since 1998
