= Duomo of San Giovanni Battista, Loano =

Roman Catholic Cathedral in Loano, Italy

Coordinates: 44.1286°N 8.2597°E

Duomo of San Giovanni Battista
- Prepositural Church of San Giovanni Battista, Duomo of Loano; Italian: Chiesa Prepositurale di San Giovanni Battista, Duomo di Loano
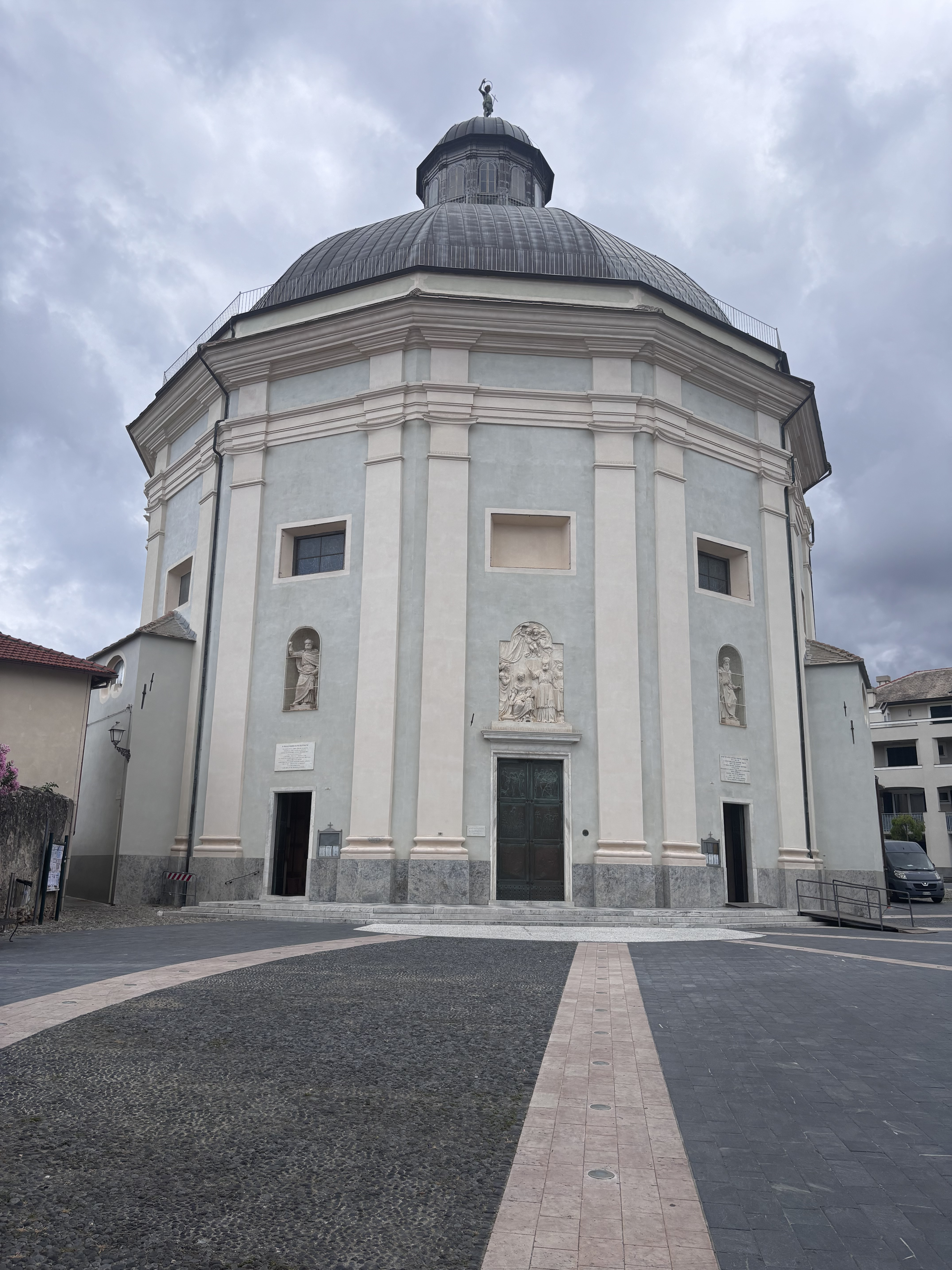
- The Duomo in 2025
- Duomo of San Giovanni Battista
- Location: Loano
- Country: Italy
- Denomination: Roman Catholic

History
- Founded: 21 February 1633
- Founder: Doria Family
- Dedication: Saint John the Baptist
- Dedicated: 1633, 1662
- Consecrated: 17 September 1662

Architecture
- Style: Renaissance
- Years built: 1633-1638, 1887

Specifications
- Height: 50 m (160 ft)

Administration
- Diocese: Diocese of Albenga-Imperia

The Duomo of San Giovanni Battista, also known as Duomo of Loano and Il Cupolone by locals, is a Roman Catholic Cathedral located in Loano, Liguria.

== History ==
Construction of the Cathedral began on 21 February 1633, and was funded by the Doria Family of Genova, which ruled Loano from 1505 to 1737. Construction ended on 28 March 1638, and the church was consecrated on 17 September 1662. It has a dodecagonal shape, and is topped off with a dome, 50 meters tall, which replaced a previous roof that was destroyed in the 1887 Liguria earthquake. At the top of the dome there is a statue of Saint John the Baptist. The nearby bell tower of the Oratorio di Nostra Signora del Rosario used to belong to the previous Duomo, which was demolished in the 17th century.

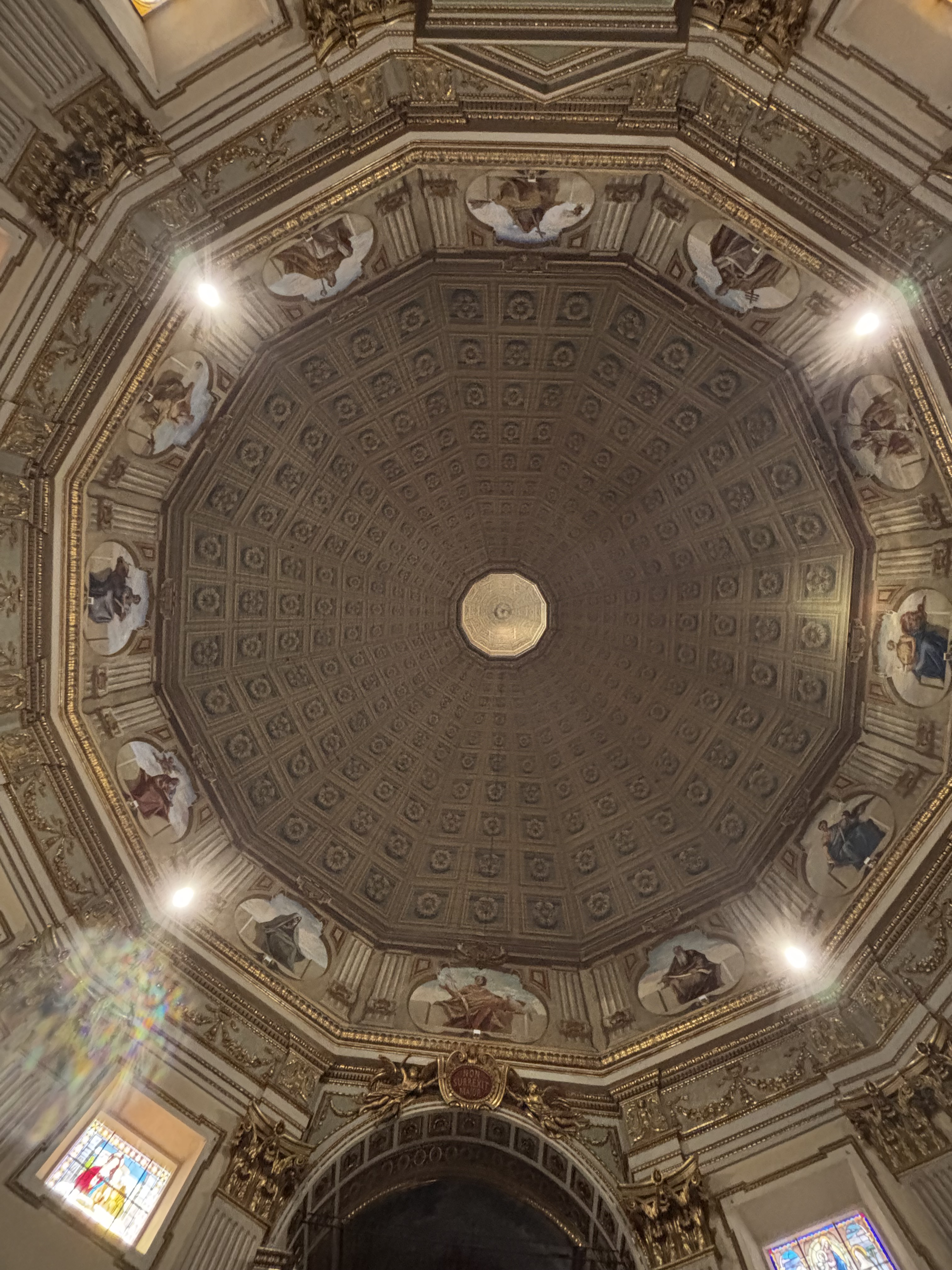
The Dome

The interior of the church is decorated with numerous artworks from the 17th century. In the chapels on the right there is a portrait of Santa Barbara by Luciano Borzone, painted in 1642, along with one of San Sebastiano by Orazio de Ferrari, painted in 1645, and one of the crucifixion, by Borzone. Behind the main altar, there is a painting of 'La Nascita del Battesimo' by Giovanni Andrea Ansaldo, completed in 1625. In the chapels on the left, there is a painting of the Virgin Mary, Saint Anthony Abbott, and Paolo Eremita, all by de Ferrari, and a painting of the beheading of Saint John the Baptist by Giovanni Domenico Cappellino.

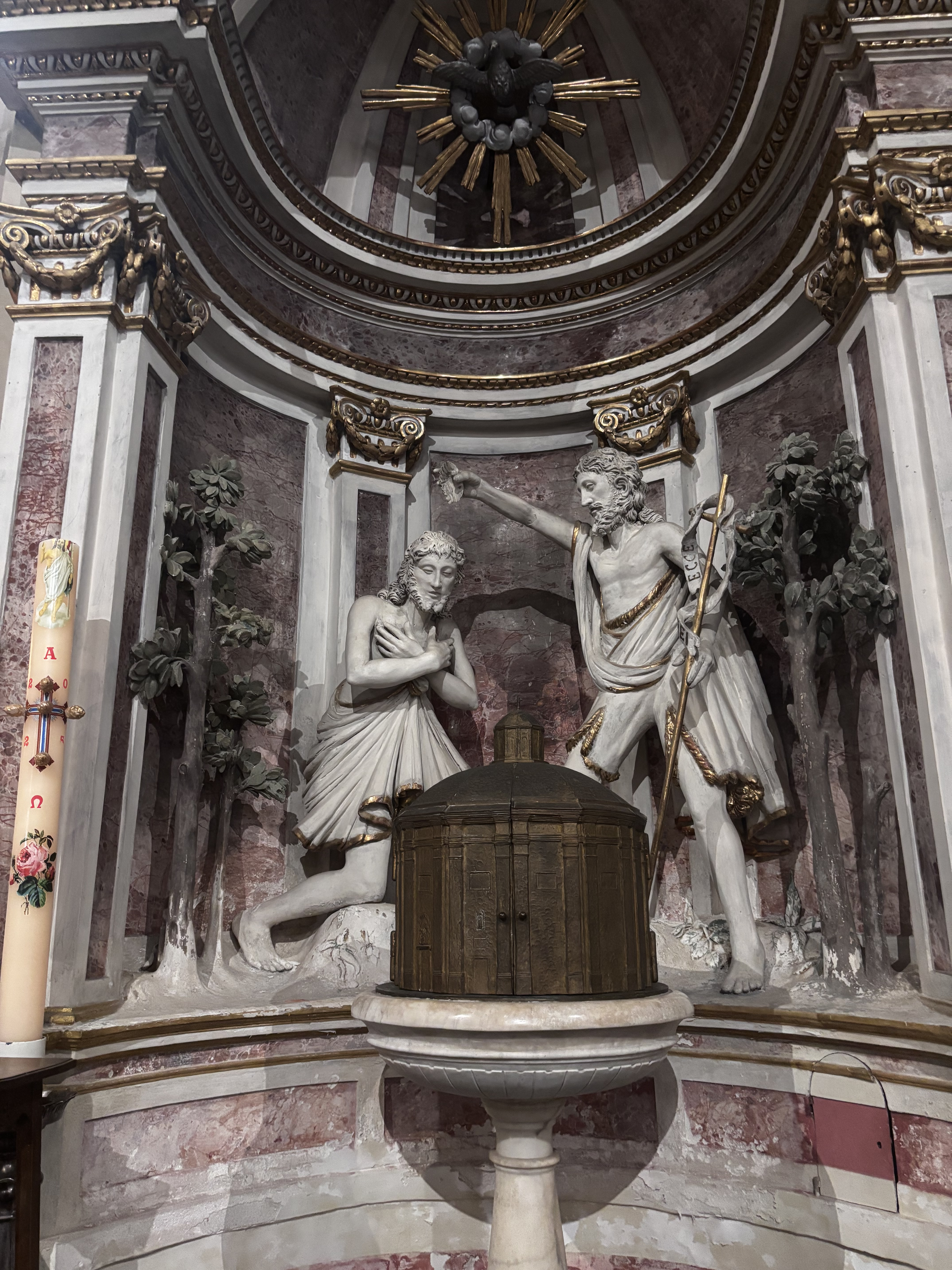
The Baptismal Font

The baptistery has two statues, one of Jesus being baptised, and one of Saint John the Baptist, baptising Jesus.
